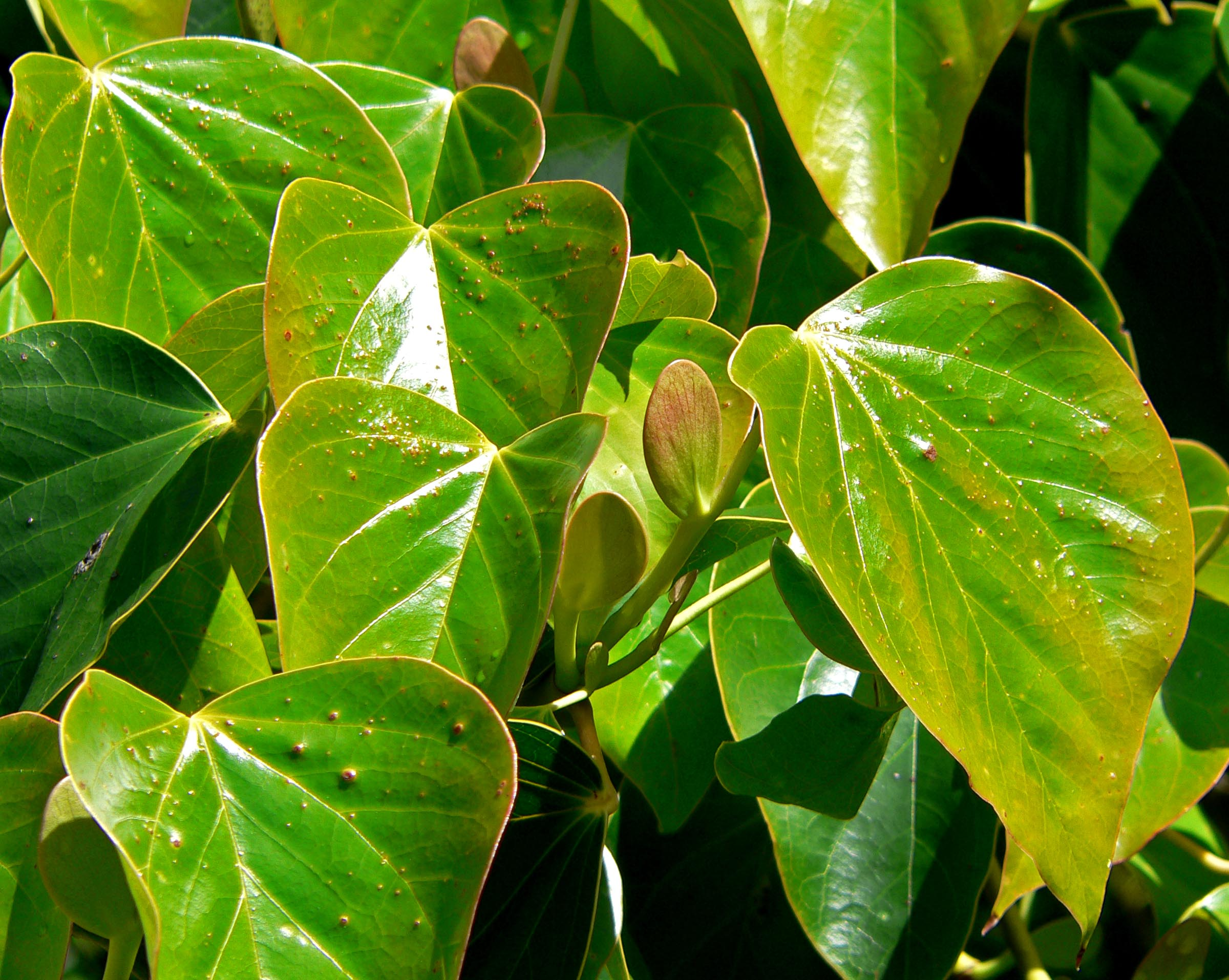
- Exbucklandia populnea

Scientific classification
- Kingdom: Plantae
- Clade: Tracheophytes
- Clade: Angiosperms
- Clade: Eudicots
- Order: Saxifragales
- Family: Hamamelidaceae
- Subfamily: Exbucklandioideae; H.T.Chang
- Genus: Exbucklandia; R.W.Br.

Type species
- Exbucklandia populnea (R.Br. ex Griff.) R.W.Br.

Species
- Exbucklandia longipetala H.T.Chang; Exbucklandia populnea (R.Br. ex Griff.) R.W.Br.; Exbucklandia tonkinensis (Lecomte) H.T.Chang

Synonyms
- Bucklandia R.Br. ex Griff.; Symingtonia Steenis

= Exbucklandia =

Genus of flowering plants

Exbucklandia is a genus of flowering plants in the family Hamamelidaceae. They are medium to large trees whose natural range is from eastern India through southern China and southward through the Malay Peninsula. In India and China, they are widely cultivated for their impressive foliage and valuable lumber. A few have been grown in the southernmost parts of the United States. To speakers of English, Exbucklandia is generally known as the Pipli tree, from the Bengali name for the species Exbucklandia populnea.

== Cultivation ==
Propagation is usually by seed, but cuttings have been successful under favorable conditions. Plantations of the young trees must be fenced against cattle and deer which eat whatever leaves they can reach. If Exbucklandia is grown in the open, the trunk forks and branches are retained close to the ground. In the forest, where it usually grows, the trunk is single, straight, and free of branches for 9 to 18 metres. Saplings grow slowly for the first few years, then more quickly later on.

== Species ==
Only three species names have ever been published in Exbucklandia. These are Exbucklandia populnea, Exbucklandia tonkinensis, and Exbucklandia longipetala. The specific epithets refer to poplars, Tonkin, and long petals.

Exbucklandia populnea is found throughout the entire range of the genus. Exbucklandia tonkinensis is native to southeastern China, Laos, and northern Vietnam. Exbucklandia longipetala has a much more restricted range, being known only from the Guangxi and Guizhou provinces of China.

Further field work will be needed to determine whether these are three distinct entities and whether the specimens assigned to Exbucklandia populnea represent a single species or two. Consequently, estimates of the number of species range from two to four.

== Description ==
The following description of Exbucklandia applies only to extant species and does not necessarily hold for species known only from the fossil record. It is adapted from the description in Flora of China volume 9, with the exceptions noted.

Exbucklandias are evergreen trees. Exbucklandia populnea and Exbucklandia tonkinensis are usually 16 to 20 meters in height, occasionally reaching 30 meters. The largest known individual of Exbucklandia populnea grew to 45 meters in the Darjeeling Hills of India. The usual height of Exbucklandia longipetala is not known. The twigs have conspicuous nodes.

The leaves are attractively reddish when immature. They are arranged alternately on the stems, an arrangement unusual for Hamamelidaceae. The petioles are long and the leaves flutter in even a light breeze, like the leaves of poplars. The poplar petiole is flattened, and in cross section, it is long in the vertical direction. Whether Exbucklandia has the same sort of petiole has not been recorded.

The leaf blade is simple, and sometimes has three pointed lobes, or rarely, five. It is thickly leathery and its margin is entire. The venation is palmate, with the secondary veins radiating from the apex of the petiole. The stipules are large and coherent; soon falling away.

Each inflorescence has 7 to 16 flowers and is located in the axil of a leaf. The flowers are small and bisexual. Sepals are completely lacking. Petals are often absent, but are small and white when present. Some authors have interpreted what appear to be petals as petaloid staminodes.

The stamens are 10 to 15 in number. The anthers are basifixed, as in all of Hamamelidaceae. Each theca has one sporangium, whereas for most angiosperms, there are two. The thecae open by one valve.

The ovary is half-inferior and, as in the rest of the family, consists of two carpels. The number of ovules in each carpel has been reported as five or six and as six to eight. What some authors have loosely called styles are actually styluli. These are separate by definition, channeling the pollen tubes that invade them into only one carpel. Each stigma is somewhat decurrent down one side of its stylulus.

The fruit is a 4-valved capsule. The two locules separate, and each splits into two valves. Each locule contains five to seven seeds. The upper four or five are sterile and wingless. The lowest one or two are fertile and narrowly winged. The seeds are light and can travel far in a strong wind.

== Affinities ==
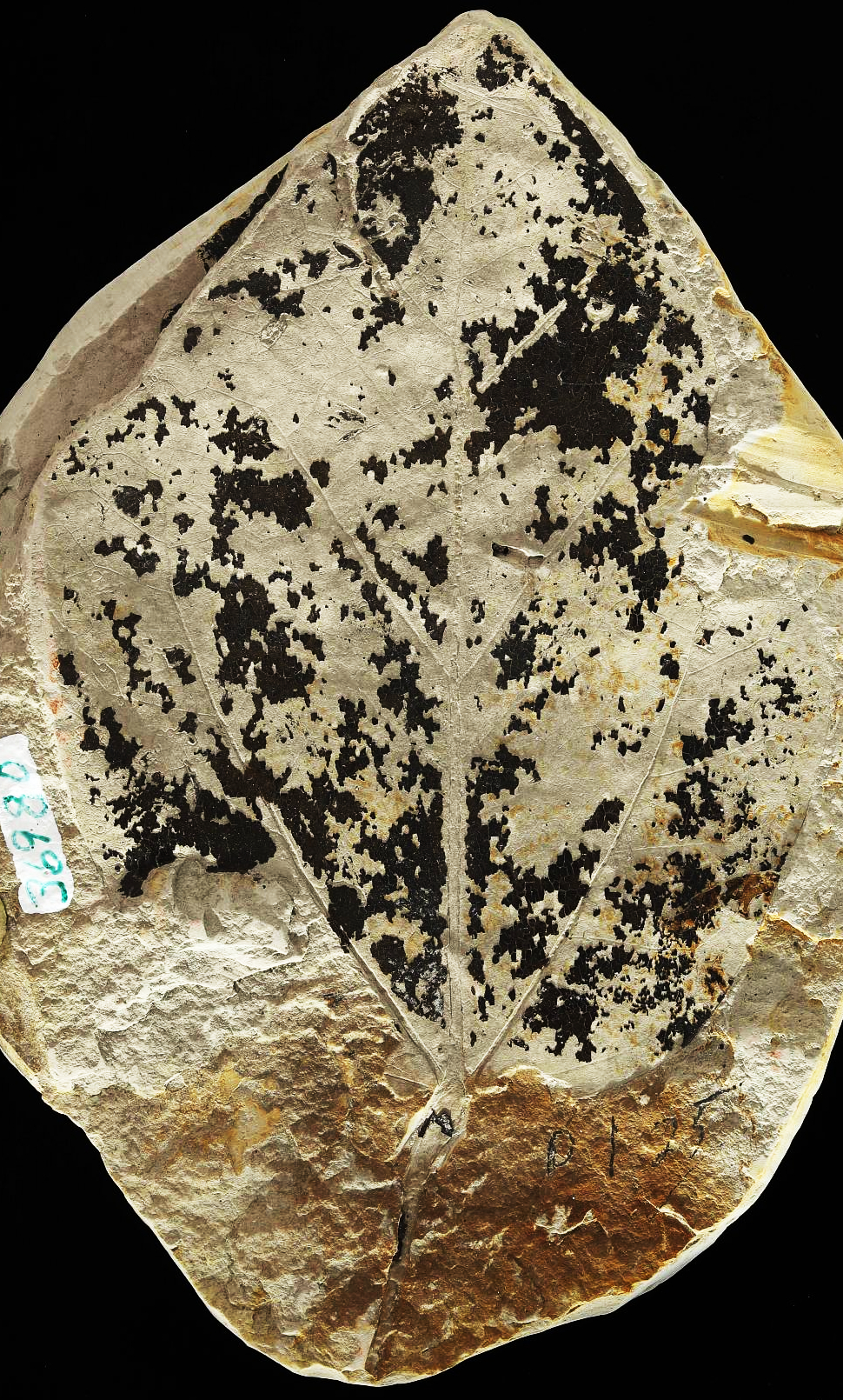
Exbucklandia oregonensis

The phylogeny of Hamamelidaceae has not been resolved with much certainty, but in one recent molecular phylogenetic study, Exbucklandia and Rhodoleia formed the most basal clade in the family. Chunia bucklandioides, a rare tree from Hainan which has never been sampled for DNA, might also be a member of this clade. Vegetatively, it is hard to distinguish from Exbucklandia, while florally, it is intermediate between Exbucklandia and Mytilaria. The morphology of Chunia indicates that if it is not in the clade with Exbucklandia and Rhodoleia, then it either forms its own clade or it is sister to Mytilaria.

== Evolution ==
Exbucklandia was once more widely distributed than it is today. Four species are known only from fossils. Exbucklandia oregonensis grew in the northwestern United States during the Oligocene and Miocene epochs. Exbucklandia microdictya is known from Paleocene deposits near Altay City in Xinjiang, China. Exbucklandia miocenica is a Miocene species from Yunnan, China. Exbucklandia tengchongensis is known from fossils recovered from a diatomite mine in Tengchong County in Yunnan, China. It dates from the Pliocene epoch.

== History ==
In 1825, the name Bucklandia was published for a fossil cycad in the "Tentamen" part of Flora der Vorwelt, the classic paleobotanical work by Kaspar Maria von Sternberg. The name has been attributed to Carl Borivoj Presl as well as to Sternberg. In 1836, Robert Brown, unaware that the name had already been taken, published the name Bucklandia populnea for the living species now known as Exbucklandia populnea to honor the Reverend William Buckland, an English geologist and paleontologist. In the case of Bucklandia, Brown did not meet the requirements of valid publication, but the name was validated by William Griffith, posthumously, in 1847. In 1924, Paul Henri Lecomte named a second species, Bucklandia tonkinensis. For more than 100 years, it remained unnoticed that two genera of plants had received the name Bucklandia. This conflict was finally resolved by Roland W. Brown in 1946. At that time, Brown wrote, "Inasmuch as the 1825 cycadeoid name has priority, the witchhazel genus requires a new name. For this purpose, I propose Exbucklandia, the derivation of which is obvious." Unaware of Brown's paper, Cornelis G.G.J. van Steenis sought to resolve the conflict of names in 1952 by replacing Bucklandia with Symingtonia. He published a notice of this oversight in 1954, acknowledging the priority of Exbucklandia over Symingtonia. In that paper, van Steenis transferred the second species to Exbucklandia, because Roland Brown had not explicitly done so in 1946. Thus van Steenis originated the combination Exbucklandia tonkinensis, but not validly, because he failed to cite the publication of the basionym as the ICBN has required since 1953. In 1959, Hung-Ta Chang validly made the combination Exbucklandia tonkinensis. In that same paper, Chang described and named the third species, Exbucklandia longipetala. A taxonomic history and a description of each of the three species can be found in Flora of China volume 9.
