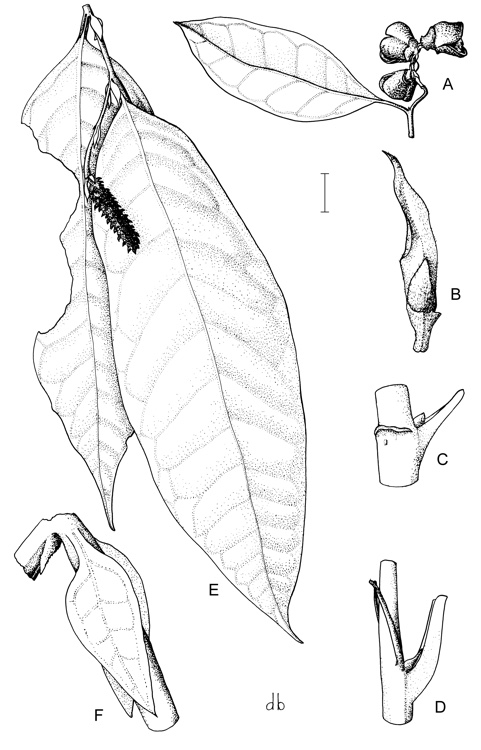
- Botanical sketch

Conservation status
- Least Concern (NCA)

Scientific classification
- Kingdom: Plantae
- Clade: Embryophytes
- Clade: Tracheophytes
- Clade: Spermatophytes
- Clade: Angiosperms
- Clade: Eudicots
- Order: Saxifragales
- Family: Hamamelidaceae
- Subfamily: Hamamelidoideae
- Tribe: Dicorypheae
- Genus: Ostrearia; Baill. ex Nied.
- Species: O. australiana

Binomial name
- Ostrearia australiana Baill.

= Ostrearia =

Genus of flowering plants

Ostrearia is a monotypic genus—i.e. a genus containing only one species—of plants in the witch-hazel family Hamamelidaceae. It is the first described of three monotypic Australian genera in this family, the others being Neostrearia and Noahdendron. It is most closely related to these genera, as well as Trichocladus (4 species) from southern Africa and Dicoryphe (13 species) from Madagascar, and together these five genera form a distinct clade within Hamamelidaceae.

The sole species in this genus is Ostrearia australiana, which was described in 1873 and is endemic to the rainforests of northeastern Queensland, Australia.

== Description ==
Ostrearia australiana is a tree up to 25 m (82 ft) tall and a trunk diameter of up to 30 cm (12 in). The leaves are simple and alternate, measuring up to 19 cm (7.5 in) long by 8 cm (3.1 in) wide, and carried on a petiole about 12 mm (0.47 in) long. They are elliptic in shape, with about eight pairs of lateral veins forming loops inside the blade margin.

The inflorescence is a spike about 3 cm (1.2 in) long produced at the ends of the branches, with flowers densely packed. Petals are pale green and about 10–12 mm (0.39–0.47 in) long and 1.5 mm (0.06 in) wide.

The fruit is a brown, woody, one- or two-lobed capsule measuring about 17 mm (0.67 in) long by 24 mm (0.94 in) wide. Each lobe contains a single seed about 15 mm (0.59 in) long.

== Taxonomy ==
This species was named in 1873 by the French botanist Henri Ernest Baillon, using material supplied to him by the Victorian botanist Ferdinand von Mueller, however Baillon could only provide an incomplete description as there was no flowering material in the specimens. He published the description in his work Adansonia; recueil d'observations botaniques under the section titled Nouvelles notes sur les Hamamélidées (New notes on the Hamamelidaceae).

=== Etymology ===
The genus name Ostrearia is from the Latin word ostrea for oyster, referring to the capsule's similarity in appearance to an oyster. The species epithet australiana refers to Australia.

== Distribution and habitat ==
Ostrearia australiana has the broadest distribution of the three Australian species in Hamamelidaceae, but it is still restricted to a small part of northeastern Queensland. The natural range extends from near Rossville in the north to Tully in the south, including the coastal lowlands, ranges and the Atherton Tableland. It inhabits rainforest, occurring close to permanent water courses, at altitudes from sea level to about 900 m (3,000 ft).

== Conservation ==
This species is listed by the Queensland Government's Department of Environment, Science and Innovation as least concern. As of 27 February 2024, it has not been assessed by the International Union for Conservation of Nature (IUCN).

== Gallery ==
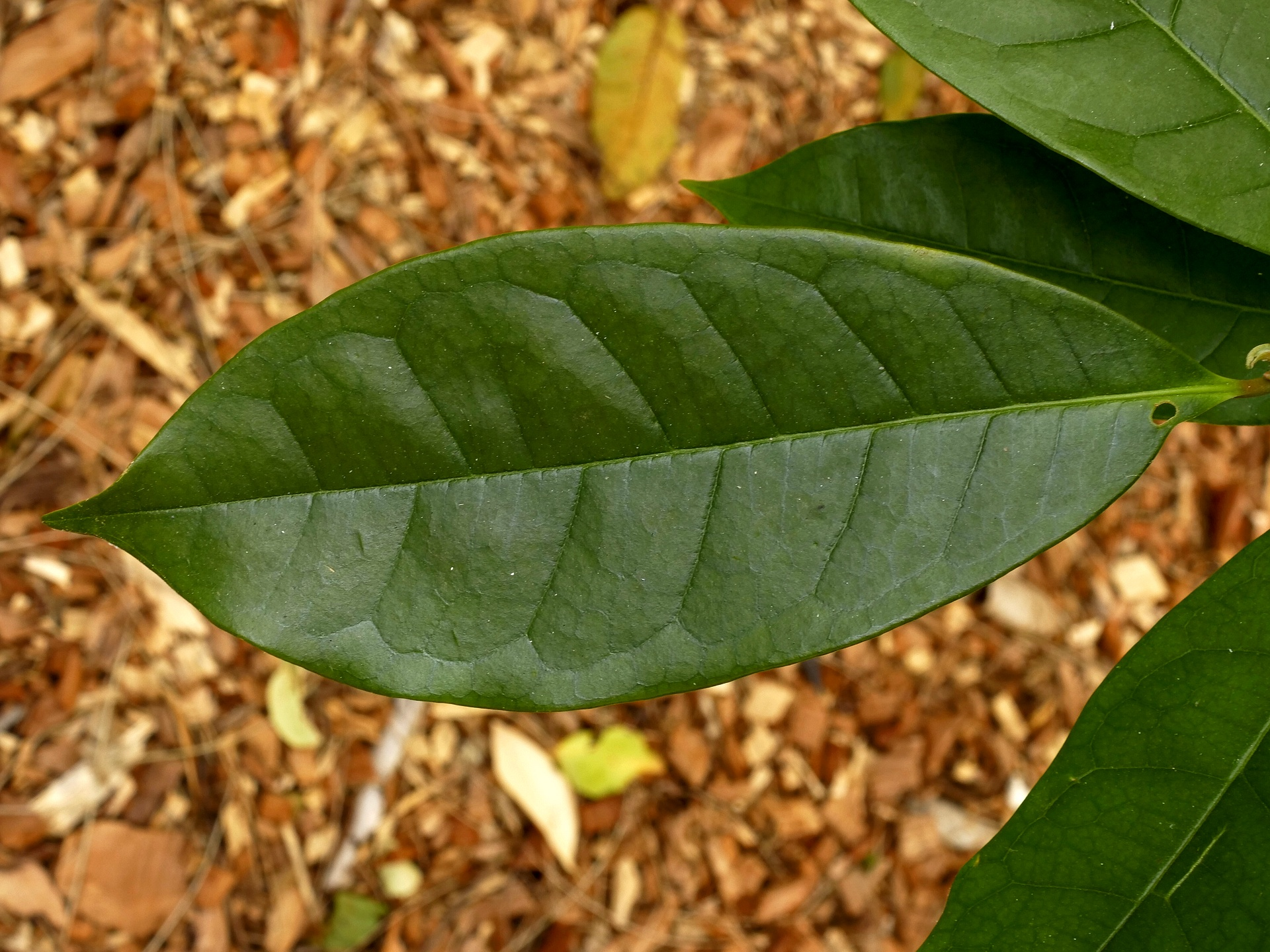
Leaves

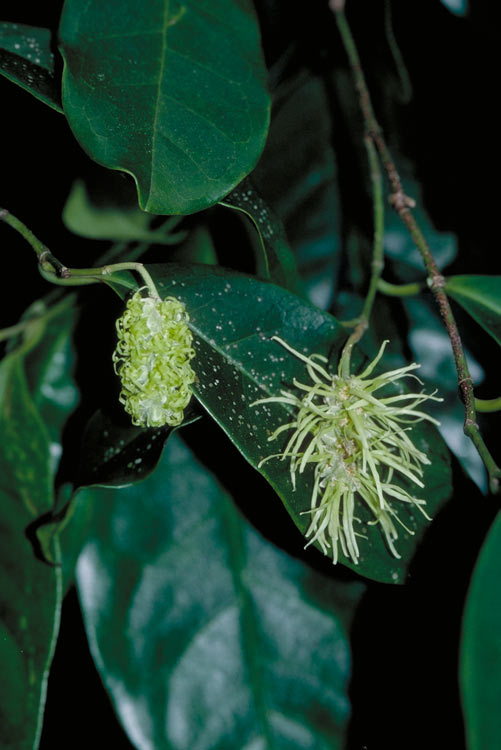
Flowers

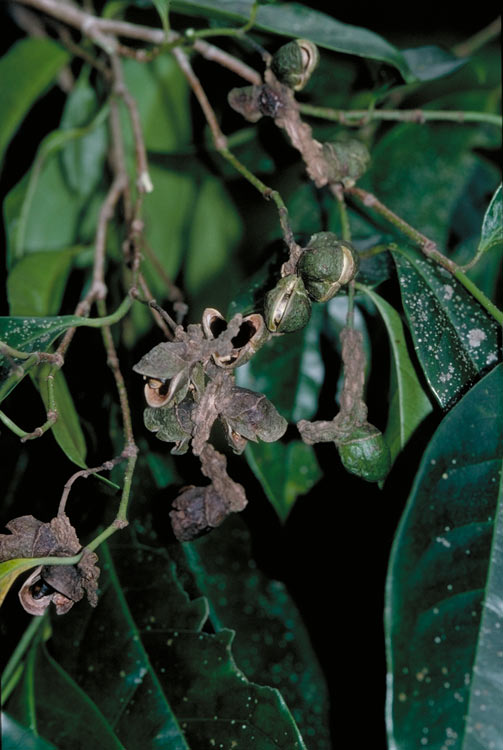
Mature fruit

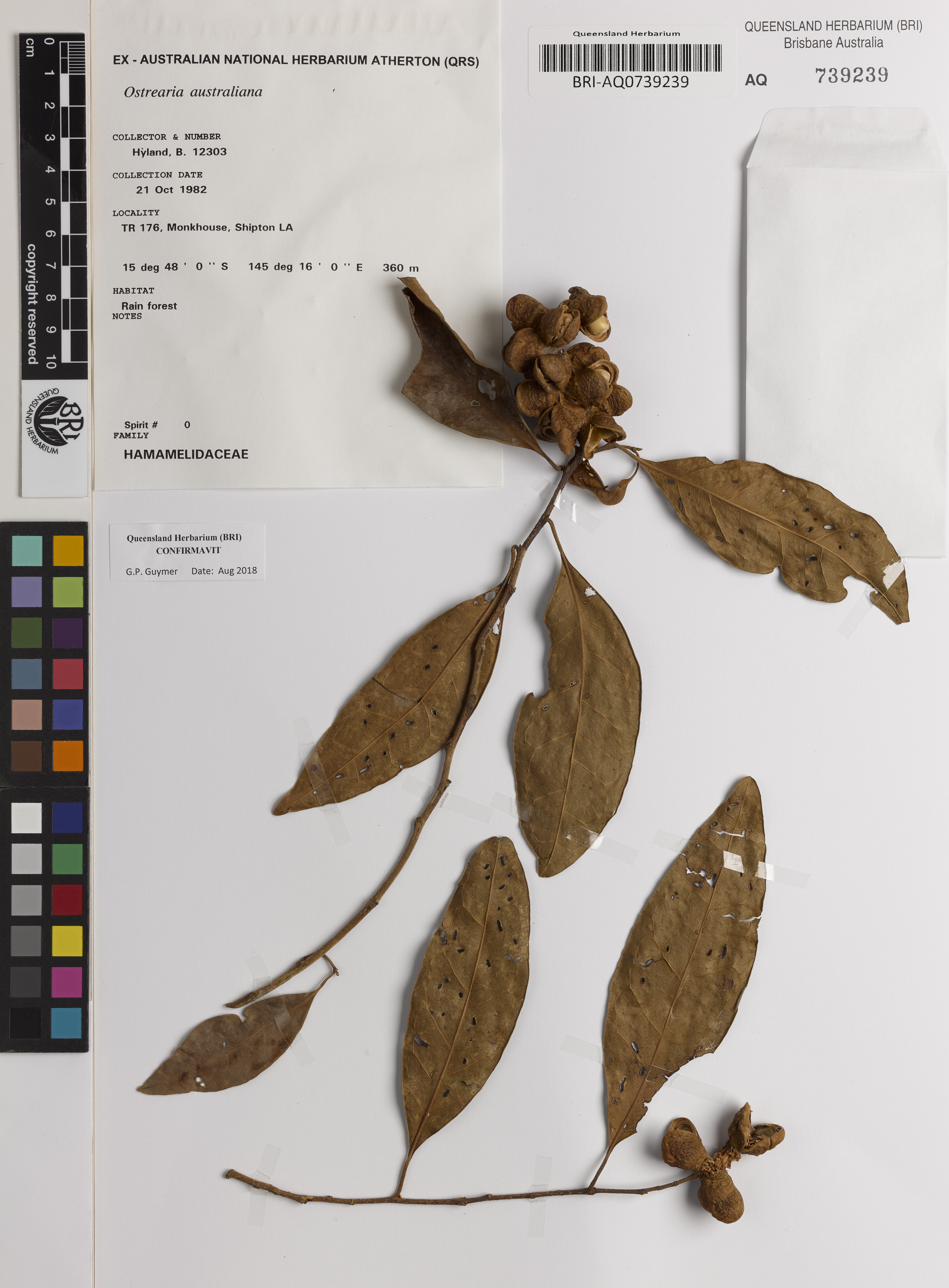
Herbarium specimen with fruit
