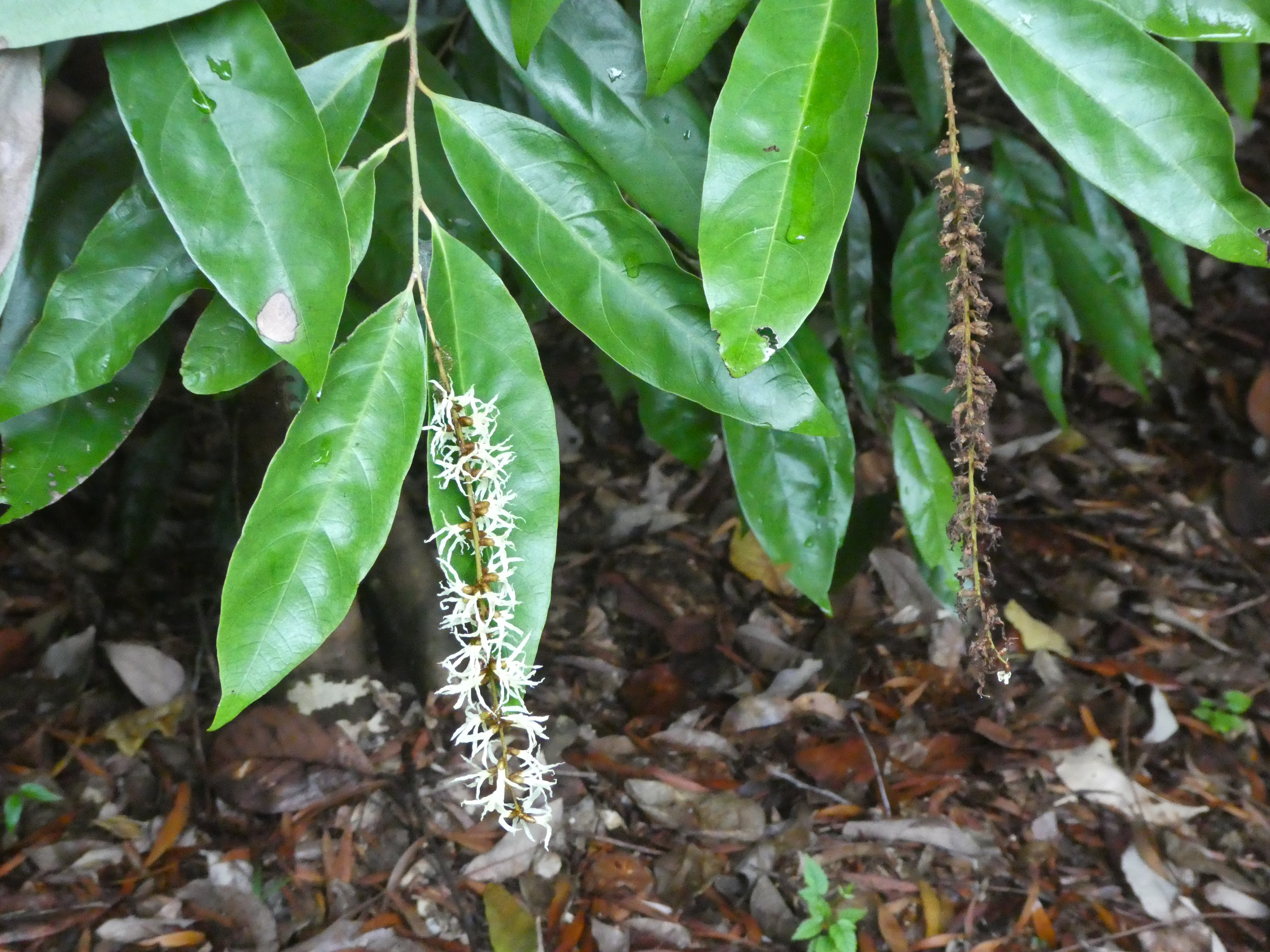
- In flower at the Cairns Botanic Gardens

Conservation status
- Near Threatened (NCA)

Scientific classification
- Kingdom: Plantae
- Clade: Embryophytes
- Clade: Tracheophytes
- Clade: Spermatophytes
- Clade: Angiosperms
- Clade: Eudicots
- Order: Saxifragales
- Family: Hamamelidaceae
- Subfamily: Hamamelidoideae
- Tribe: Dicorypheae
- Genus: Neostrearia; L.S.Sm.
- Species: N. fleckeri

Binomial name
- Neostrearia fleckeri L.S.Sm.

= Neostrearia =

Neostrearia fleckeri

Genus of flowering plants

Neostrearia is a monotypic genus—i.e. a genus containing only one species—of plants in the witch-hazel family Hamamelidaceae. It is the second described of three monotypic Australian genera in this family, the others being Ostrearia and Noahdendron. It is most closely related to these genera, as well as Trichocladus (4 species) from southern Africa and Dicoryphe (13 species) from Madagascar, and together these five genera form a distinct clade within Hamamelidaceae.

The sole species in this genus is Neostrearia fleckeri, described in 1958 and endemic to the rainforests of northeastern Queensland, Australia.

== Description ==
Neostrearia fleckeri is a small tree growing to 10–12 m (33–39 ft) tall, and it may be buttressed. The leaves are simple and alternate, and measure up to 18 cm (7.1 in) long by 7 cm (2.8 in) wide. They are glossy green above and glaucous (chalky blue-green) below, with a petiole up to 12 mm (0.47 in) long and very fine, hair-like stipules about 4 mm (0.16 in) long.

The inflorescence is terminal (i.e. it is produced from the very end of the branch) and it takes the form of a spike. It is about 20 cm (7.9 in) long, bearing about 40–50 small sessile flowers. The calyces are densely covered in very fine brown hairs, and about 3–4 mm (0.12–0.16 in) long. The petals are creamy-yellow to white, about 15 mm (0.59 in) long and 2 mm (0.08 in) wide, with an irregular, crinkled appearance.

The fruit is a dark brown, woody capsule about 15 mm (0.59 in) long by 10 mm (0.39 in) wide. Each of the two segments of the capsule contains one or two small black seeds about 10 mm (0.39 in) long.

== Taxonomy ==
This species was described by the Australian botanist Lindsay Stuart Smith, based on material collected from Babinda Creek in 1949 by the Cairns medical practitioner, naturalist, and founder of the Flecker Herbarium, Dr. Hugo Flecker. Smith's paper was published in the journal Proceedings of the Royal Society of Queensland in 1958.

=== Etymology ===
The genus name Neostrearia is a combination of "neo" meaning new, and Ostrearia, the pre-existing, closely related genus. The species epithet fleckeri is in honour of Hugo Flecker, who collected the type specimen.

== Distribution and habitat ==
The distribution of this species is very limited, confined to coastal and sub-coastal parts of northeast Queensland from the Daintree River in the north, to near Innisfail, about 150 km (93 mi) south. The recorded collections and observations suggest it only occurs at the two extremities of that range. It grows in well developed rainforest on lowlands and foothills up to 650 m (2,130 ft), often close to creeks and rivers.

== Conservation ==
This species is listed by the Queensland Government's Department of Environment, Science and Innovation as near threatened. As of 22 February 2024, it has not been assessed by the International Union for Conservation of Nature (IUCN).

== Gallery ==
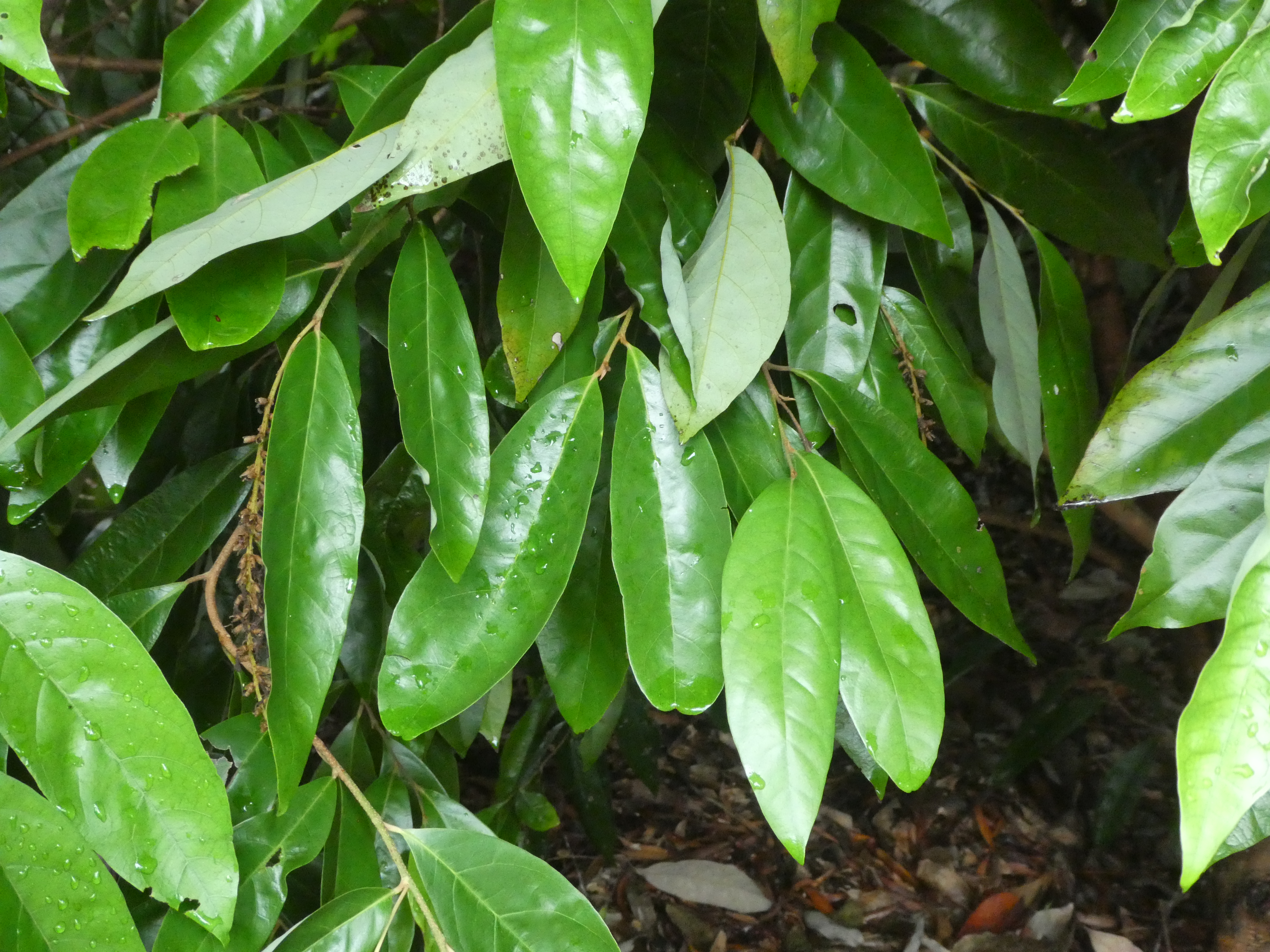
Foliage

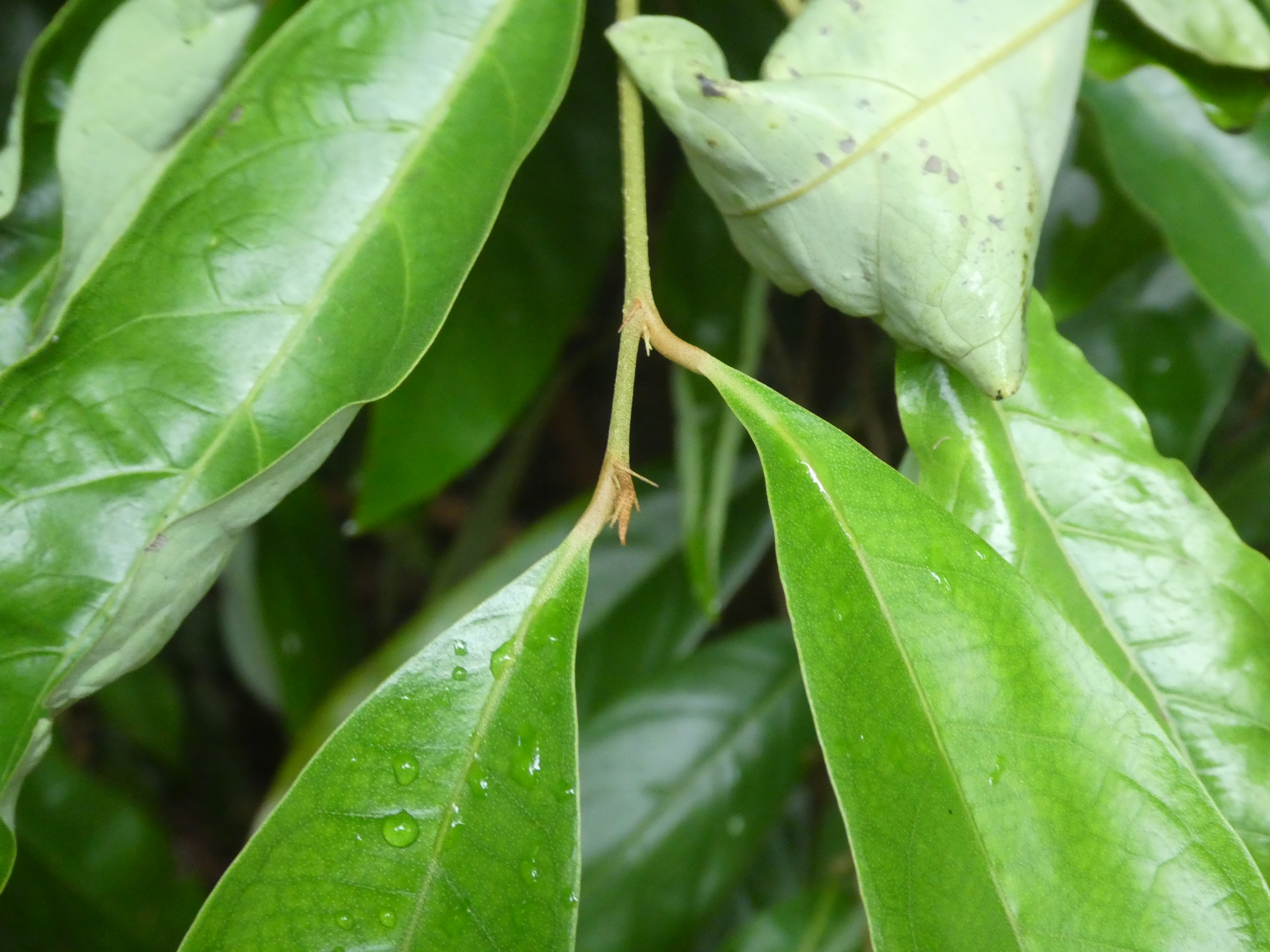
Close up of foliage showing stipules

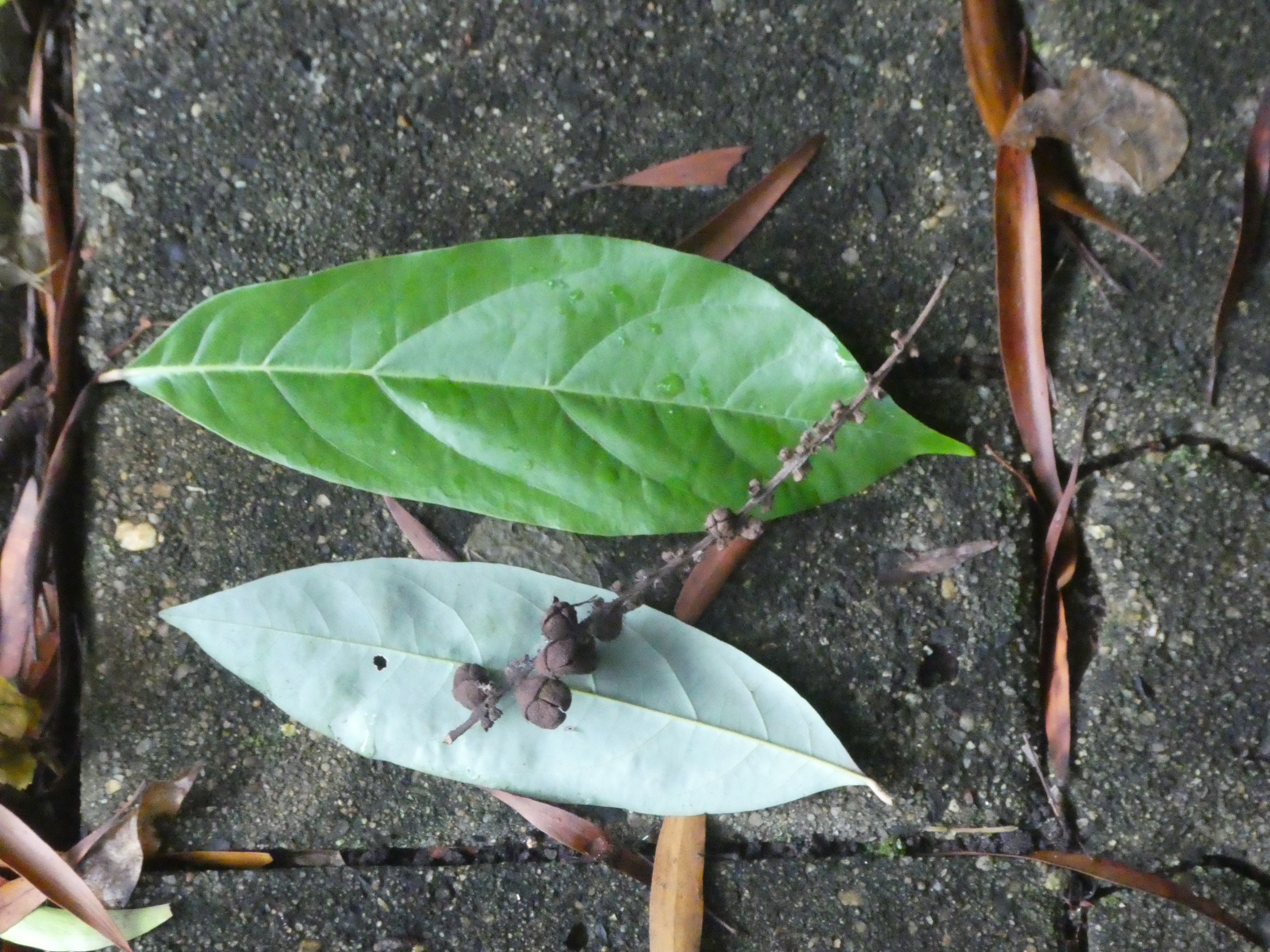
Comparison of upper and lower leaf surfaces

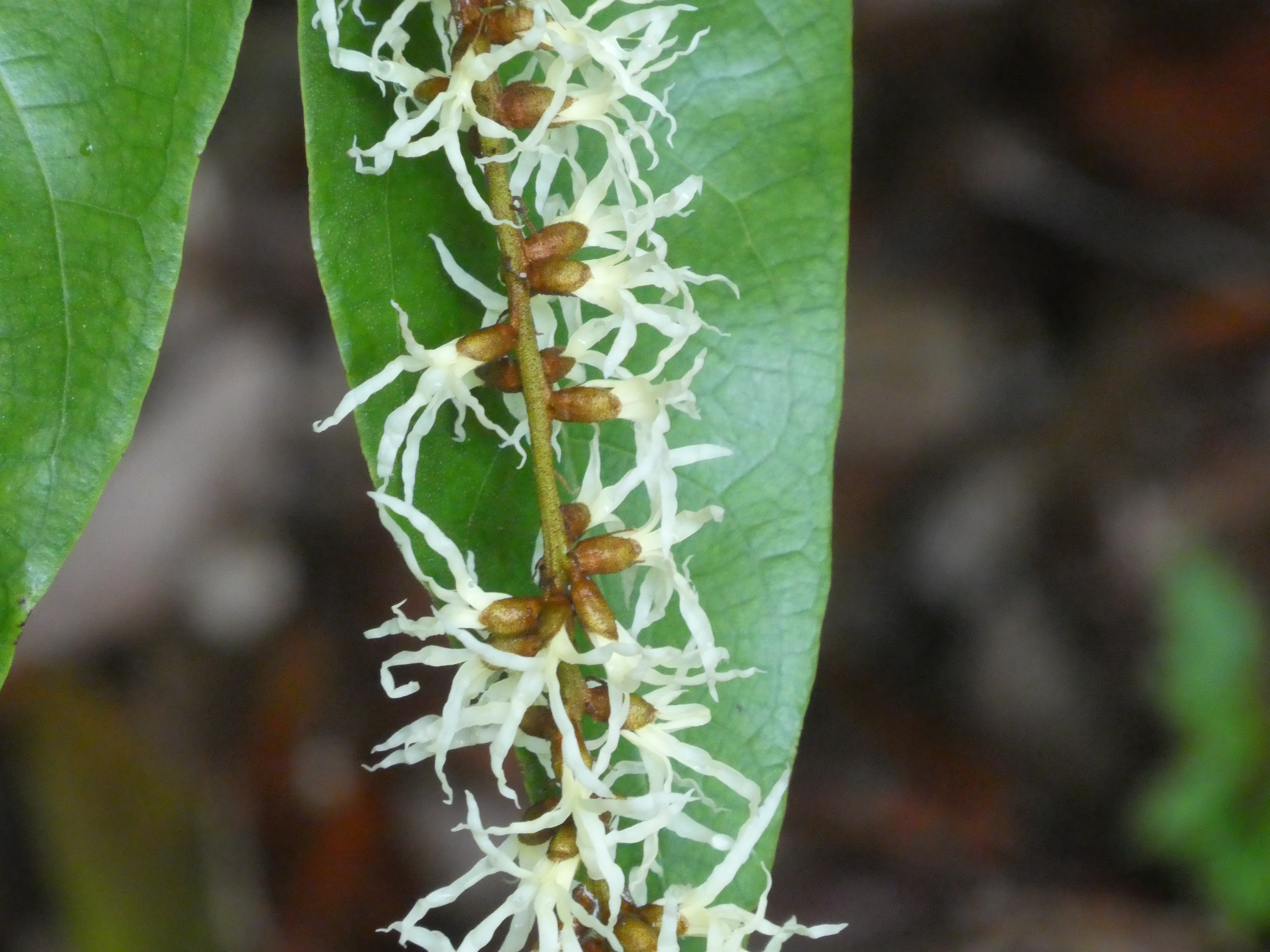
Close up of flowers

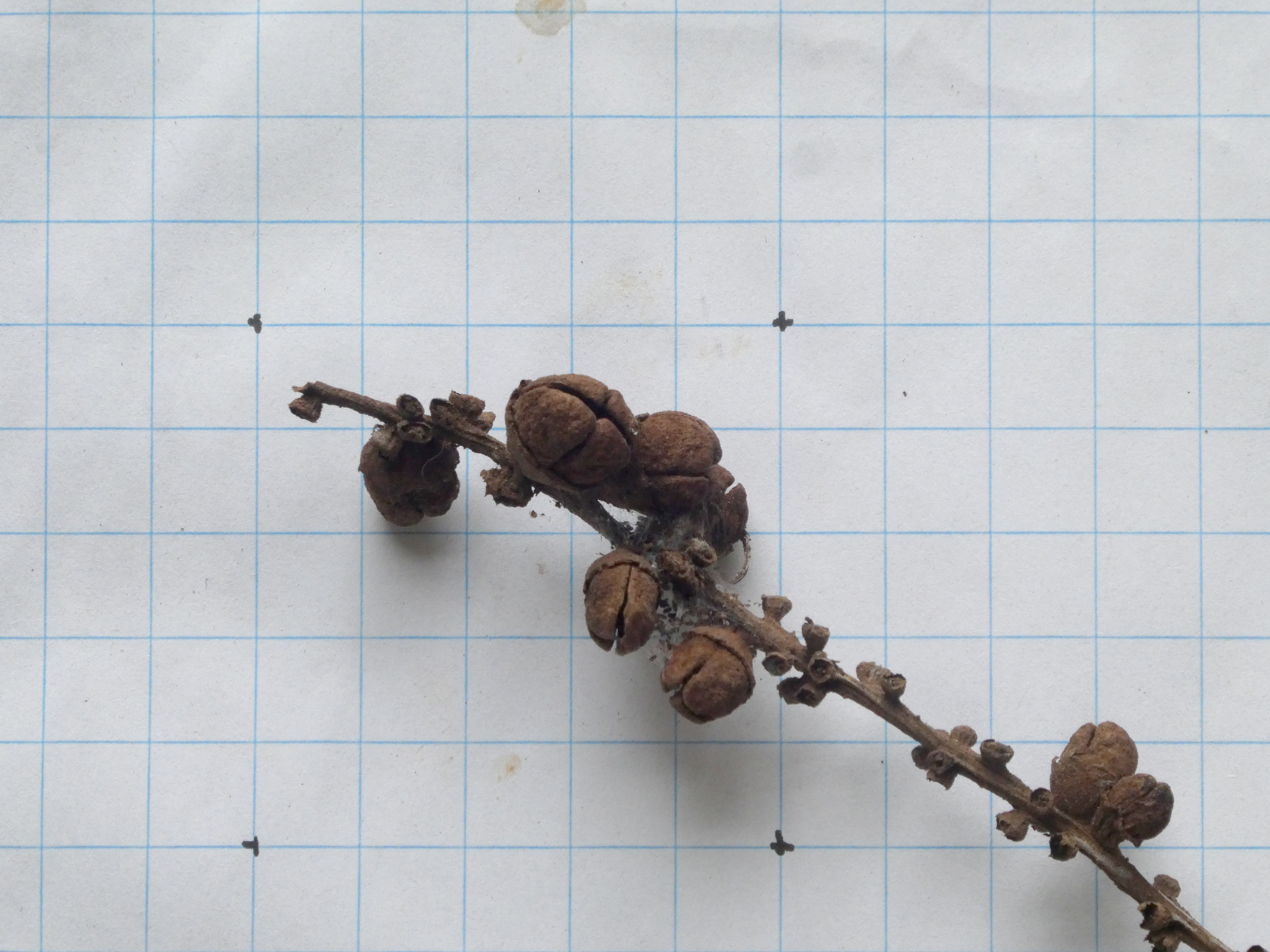
Detail of fruit against a 1 cm grid
