= Matudaea trinervia =

Conservation status
- Least Concern (IUCN 3.1)

Scientific classification
- Kingdom: Plantae
- Clade: Tracheophytes
- Clade: Angiosperms
- Clade: Eudicots
- Order: Saxifragales
- Family: Hamamelidaceae
- Genus: Matudaea
- Species: M. trinervia

Binomial name
- Matudaea trinervia Lundell

Species of flowering plant

Matudaea trinervia is a species of flowering plant in the family Hamamelidaceae. It is native to Costa Rica, El Salvador, Guatemala, Honduras, Mexico (Central, Southeast and Southwest), Nicaragua, and Veracruz.

The species has two accepted varieties:

- Matudaea trinervia var. hirsuta (Lundell) L.M.González & N.Jiménez
- Matudaea trinervia var. trinervia
