= Molinadendron hondurense =

Conservation status
- Critically Endangered (IUCN 2.3)

Scientific classification
- Kingdom: Plantae
- Clade: Tracheophytes
- Clade: Angiosperms
- Clade: Eudicots
- Order: Saxifragales
- Family: Hamamelidaceae
- Genus: Molinadendron
- Species: M. hondurense

Binomial name
- Molinadendron hondurense (Standl.) P.K.Endress

Synonyms
- Distylium hondurense Standl.

Species of flowering plant

Molinadendron hondurense is a species of flowering plant in the family Hamamelidaceae. It is a tree endemic to Honduras.
