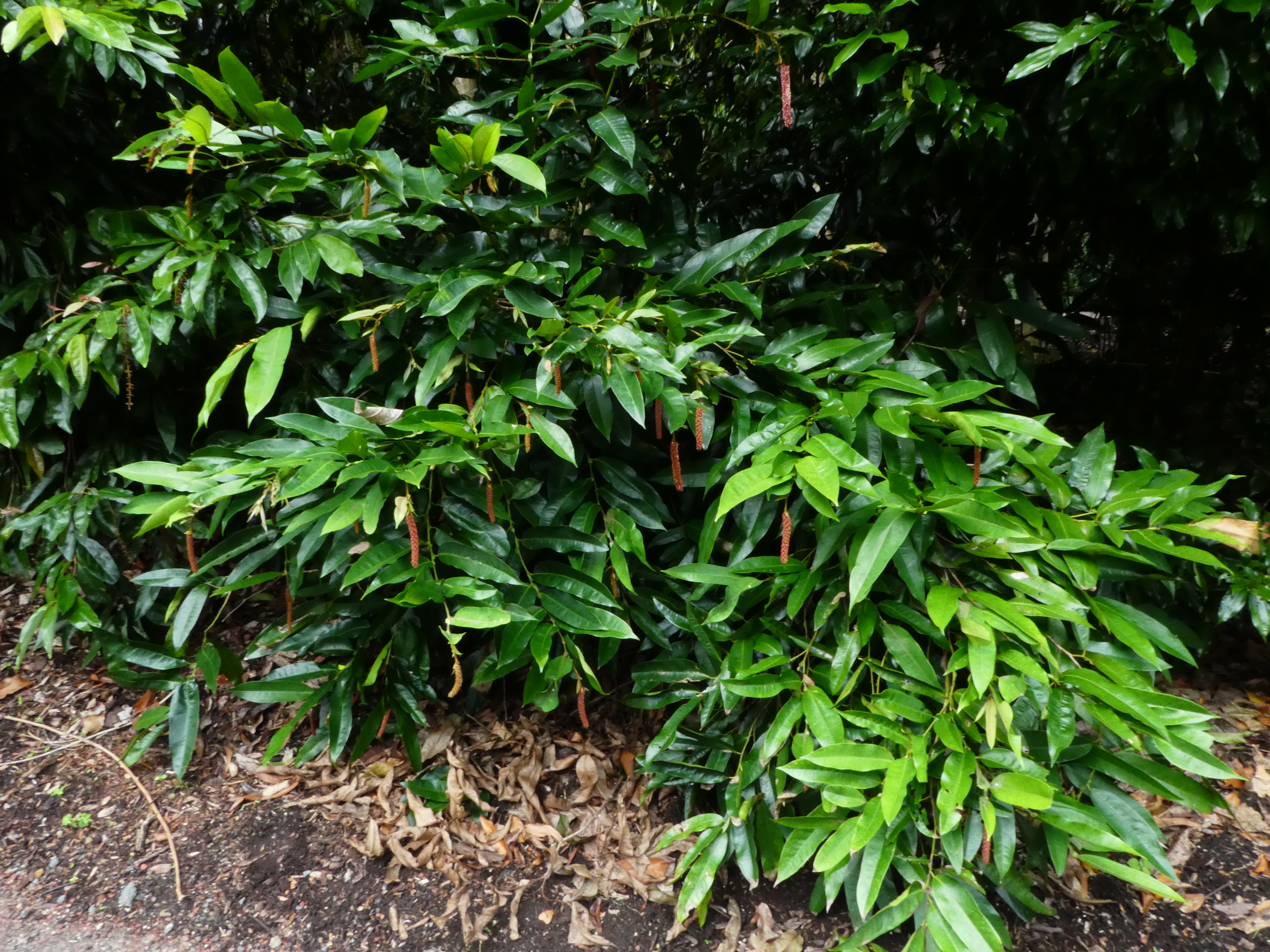
- Flowering in Cairns Botanic Gardens

Conservation status
- Endangered (NCA)

Scientific classification
- Kingdom: Plantae
- Clade: Embryophytes
- Clade: Tracheophytes
- Clade: Spermatophytes
- Clade: Angiosperms
- Clade: Eudicots
- Order: Saxifragales
- Family: Hamamelidaceae
- Subfamily: Hamamelidoideae
- Tribe: Dicorypheae
- Genus: Noahdendron; P.K.Endress, B.Hyland & Tracey
- Species: N. nicholasii

Binomial name
- Noahdendron nicholasii P.K.Endress, B.Hyland & Tracey

= Noahdendron =

Noadendron

Genus of flowering plants

Noadendron is a monotypic genus—i.e. a genus containing only one species—of plants in the witch-hazel family Hamamelidaceae. It is the third described of three monotypic Australian genera in this family, the others being Ostrearia and Neostrearia. It is most closely related to these genera, as well as Trichocladus (4 species) from southern Africa and Dicoryphe (13 species) from Madagascar, and together these five genera form a distinct clade within Hamamelidaceae.

The sole species in this genus is Noahdendron nicholasii, commonly known as noahdendron, was described in 1985 and is endemic to the rainforests of northeastern Queensland, Australia.

== Description ==
Noahdendron nicholasii is a small tree growing to about 10 m (33 ft) tall. The simple leaves are oblong to elliptic and measure up to 30 cm (12 in) long by 10 cm (3.9 in) wide. The stipules are large and leaf-like (foliose), about 2 cm (0.79 in) long, 1 cm (0.39 in) wide and ovate.

The inflorescence is terminal (i.e. it is produced from the very end of the branch) and it takes the form of a spike. It is about 7 cm (2.8 in) long, bearing numerous small sessile flowers. The calyces are brown, the petals are purple, pink or red and about 5 mm (0.20 in) long.

The fruit is a small, brown, 2-lobed, woody capsule, densely covered in fine brown hairs, each lobe containing a brown seed about 7 mm (0.28 in) long.

== Taxonomy ==
This species was first described by the Swiss botanist Peter Karl Endress, working with the Australian botanists Bernard Hyland and John Geoffrey Tracey. Their description was based on material collected separately by Tracey and Hyland from Noah Creek near Cape Tribulation, and their work was published in the journal Botanische Jahrbücher für Systematik, Pflanzengeschichte und Pflanzengeographie in 1985.

=== Etymology ===
The genus name Noahdendron is from the location where the plant grows, Noah Creek, combined with the Ancient Greek word δένδρον (dendron), meaning tree. The species epithet nicholasii is for John Nicholas, a local resident who was involved in the discovery of the plant.

== Distribution and habitat ==
Noahdendron is entirely restricted to a single catchment in the Daintree National Park. Noah Creek is about 8 km (5.0 mi) south of Cape Tribulation, and it is within this watershed that the species occurs. The altitudinal range of the plant is from sea level to 500 m (1,600 ft), and the area of occupancy is just 7 km^{2} (2.7 sq mi). (Note: For a definition of Area of Occupancy see this page at the Atlas of Living Australia)

== Conservation ==
This species is listed by the Queensland Government's Department of Environment, Science and Innovation as endangered. As of 24 February 2024, it has not been assessed by the International Union for Conservation of Nature (IUCN).

== Gallery ==
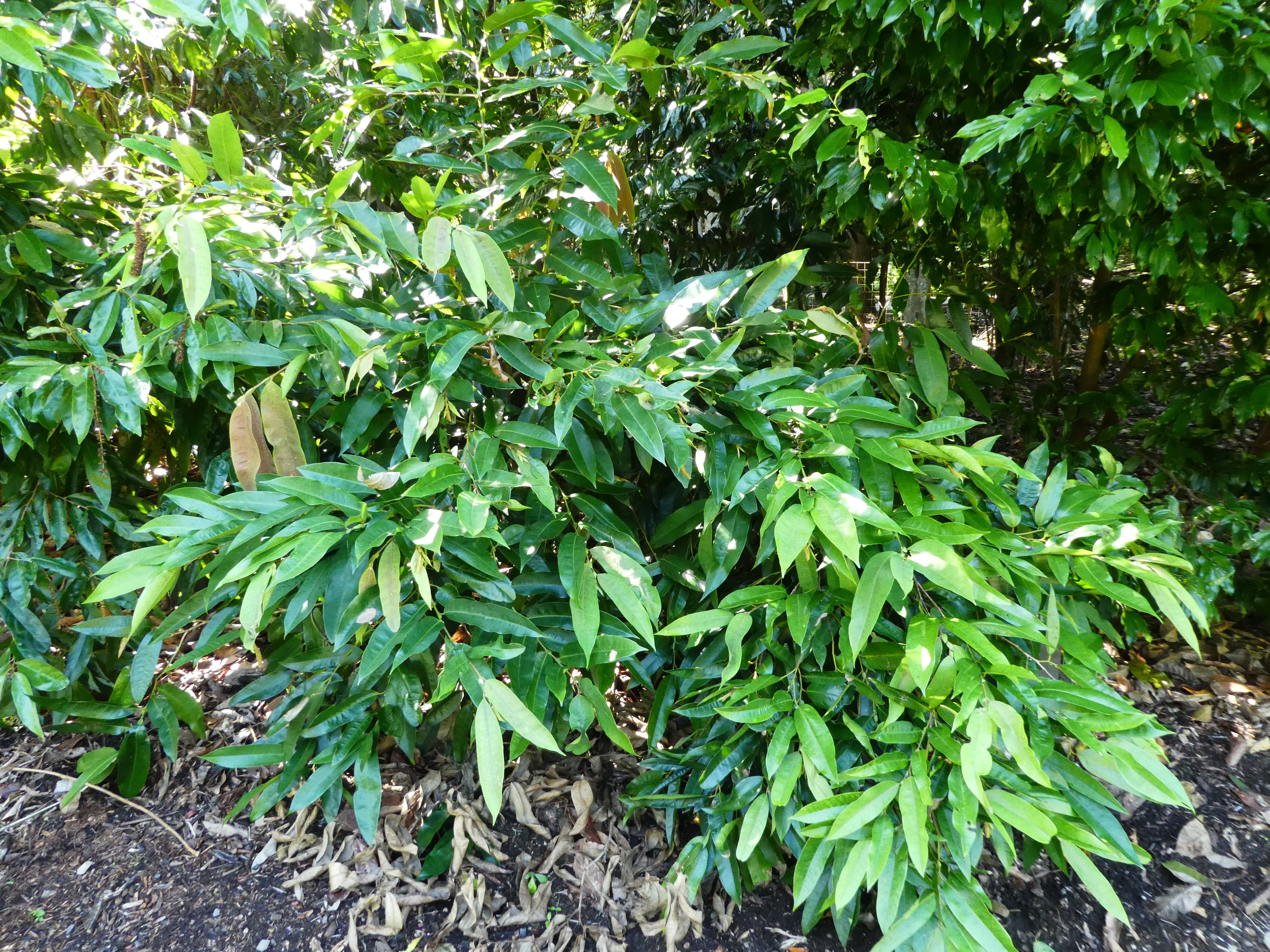
Habit

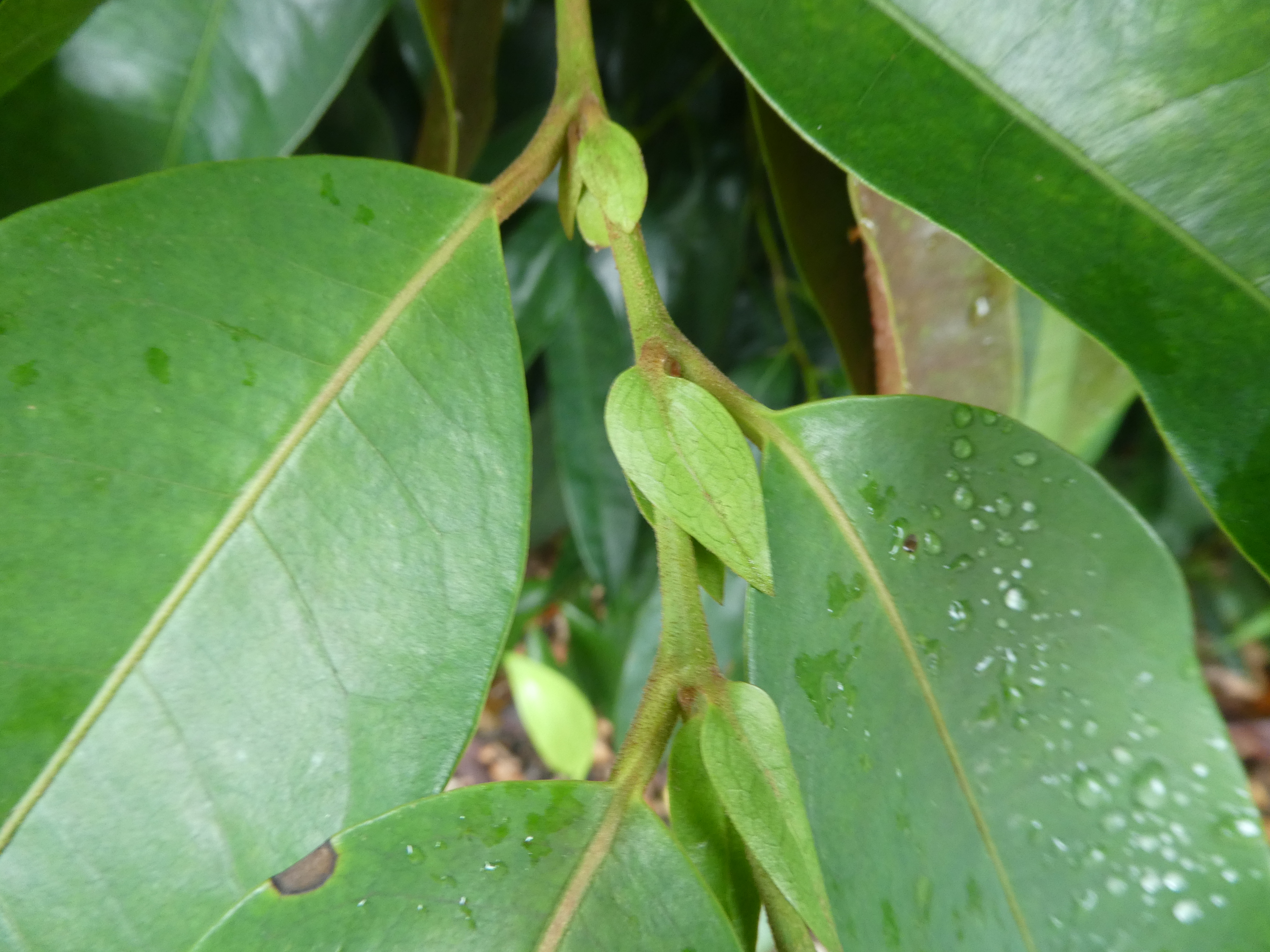
Foliose stipules

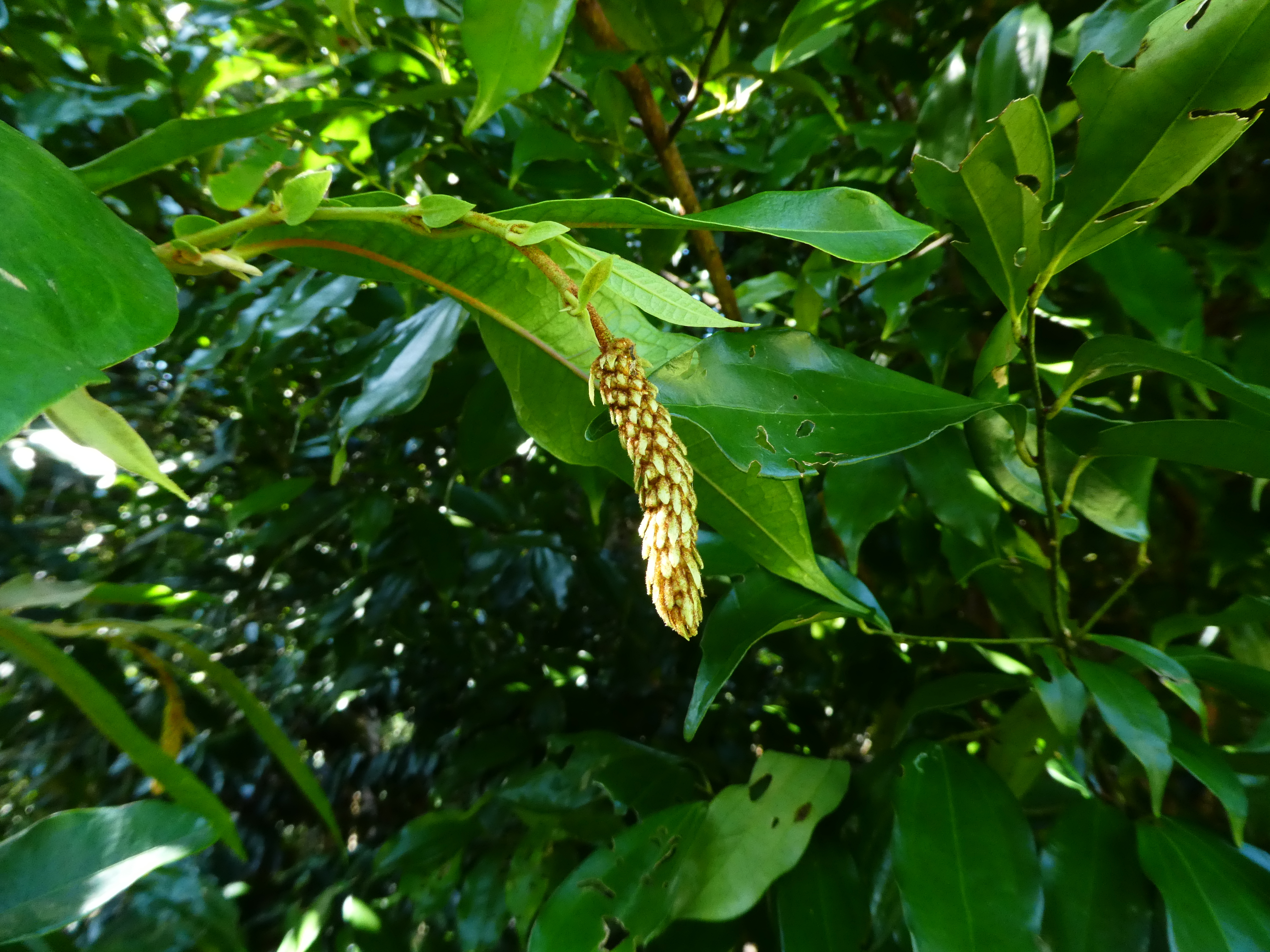
Flower budding

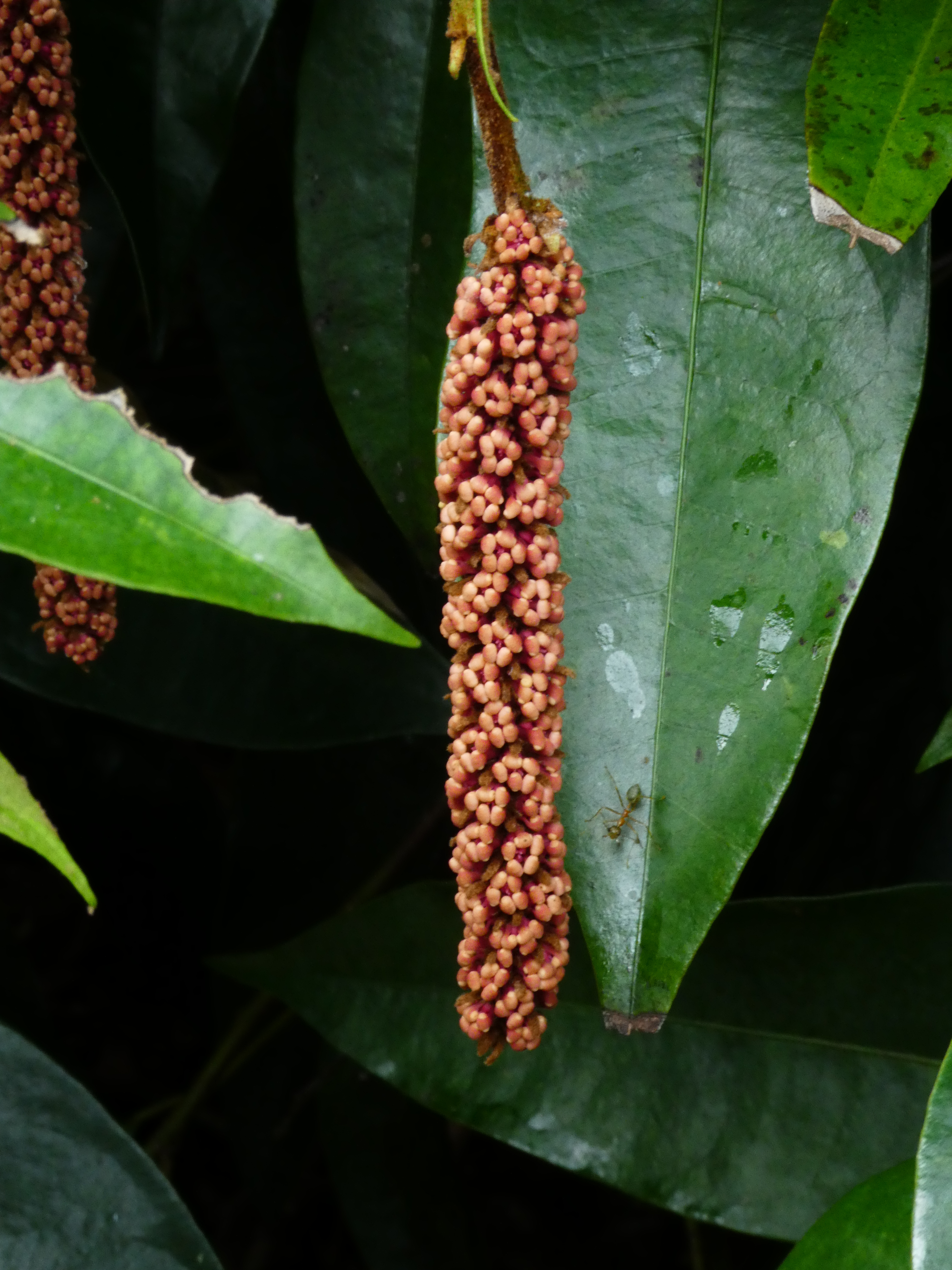
Inflorescence

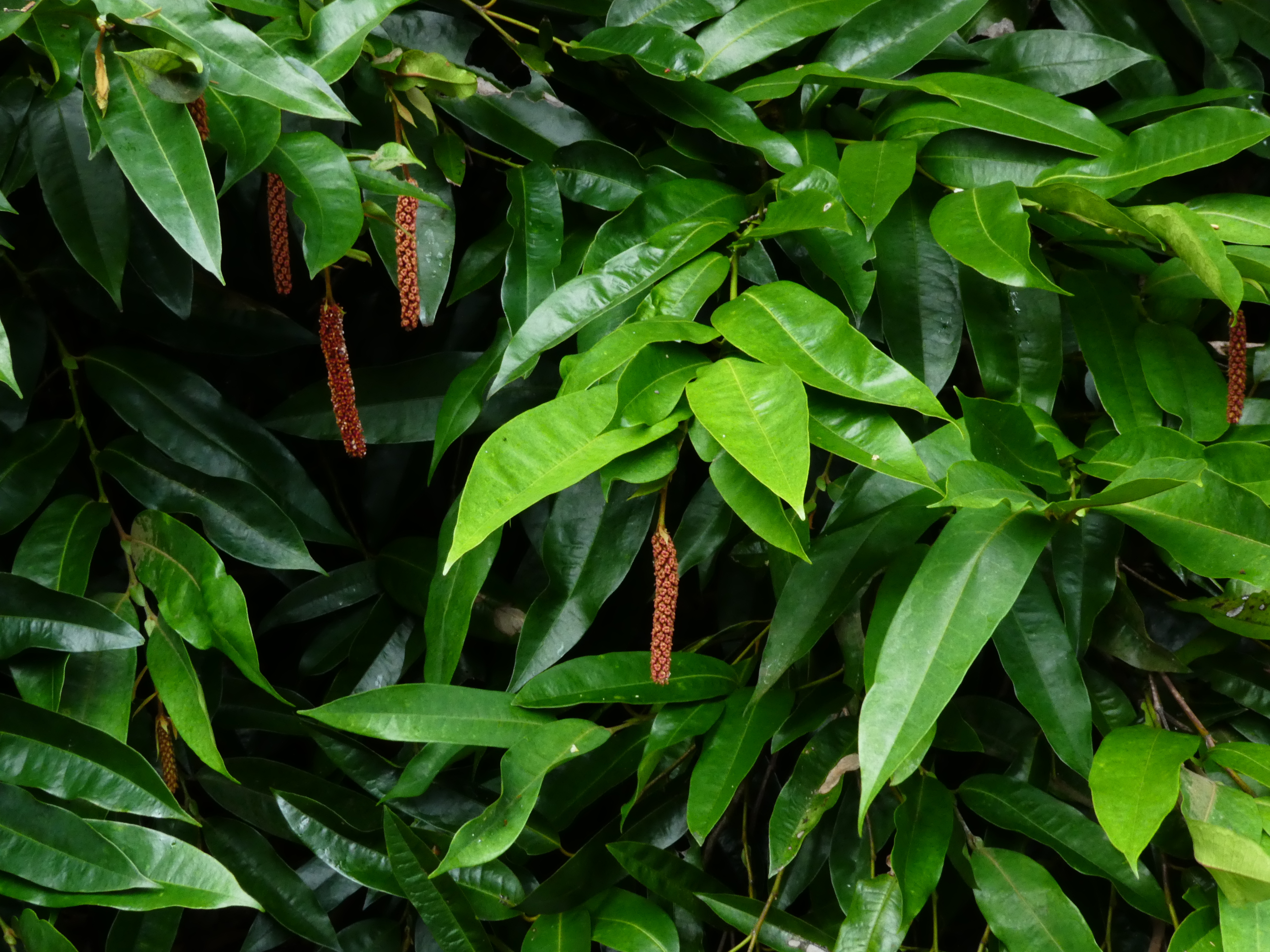
In flower
