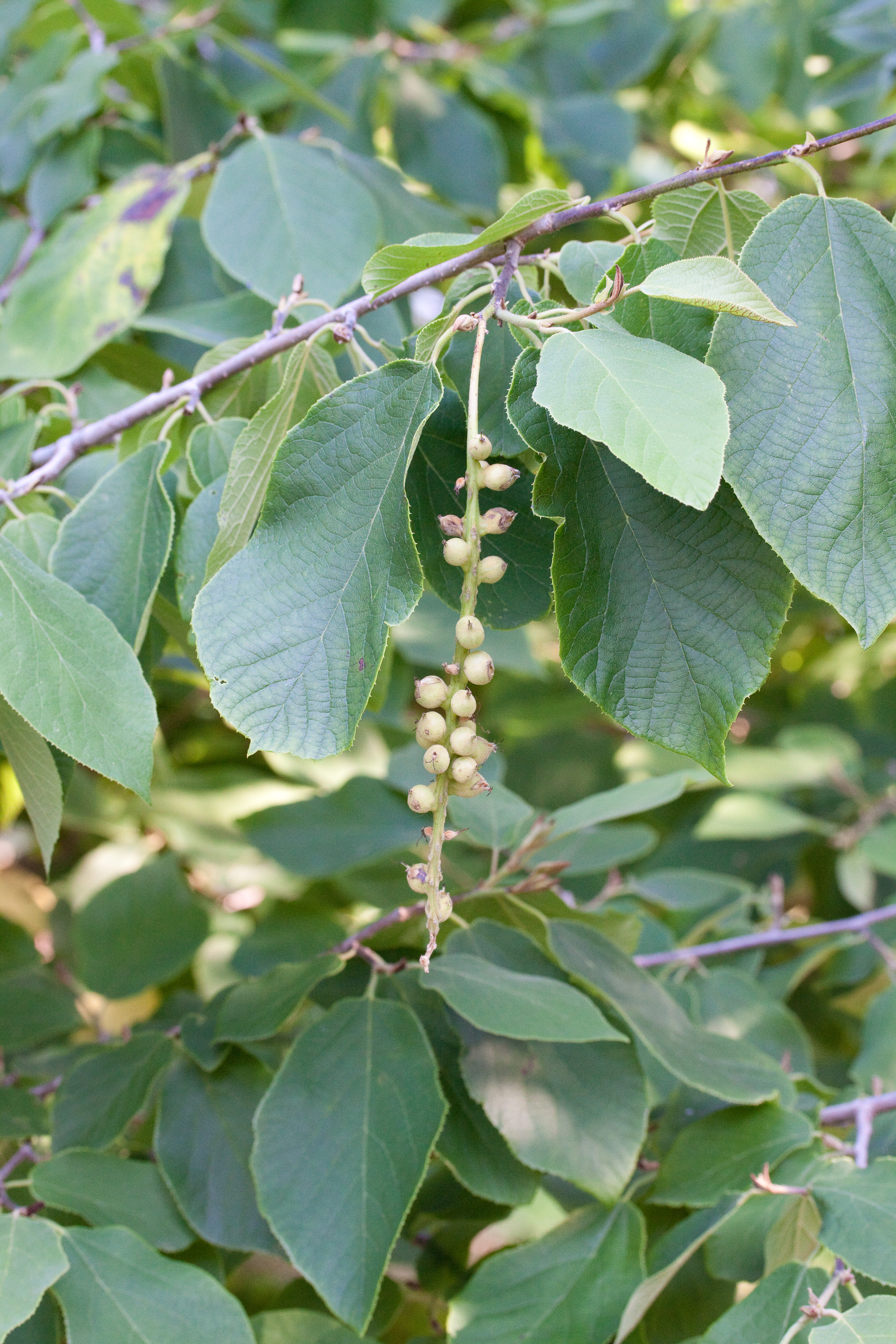
- Sinowilsonia henryi - Jeunes fruits

Conservation status
- Near Threatened (IUCN 2.3)

Scientific classification
- Kingdom: Plantae
- Clade: Tracheophytes
- Clade: Angiosperms
- Clade: Eudicots
- Order: Saxifragales
- Family: Hamamelidaceae
- Subfamily: Hamamelidoideae
- Tribe: Eustigmateae
- Genus: Sinowilsonia; Hemsl.
- Species: S. henryi

Binomial name
- Sinowilsonia henryi Hemsl.

= Sinowilsonia =

Plant genus

Sinowilsonia is a monotypic genus of plant containing the single species Sinowilsonia henryi. It is endemic to central and southern China. It is threatened by habitat loss. It is available from specialized commercial nurseries.
