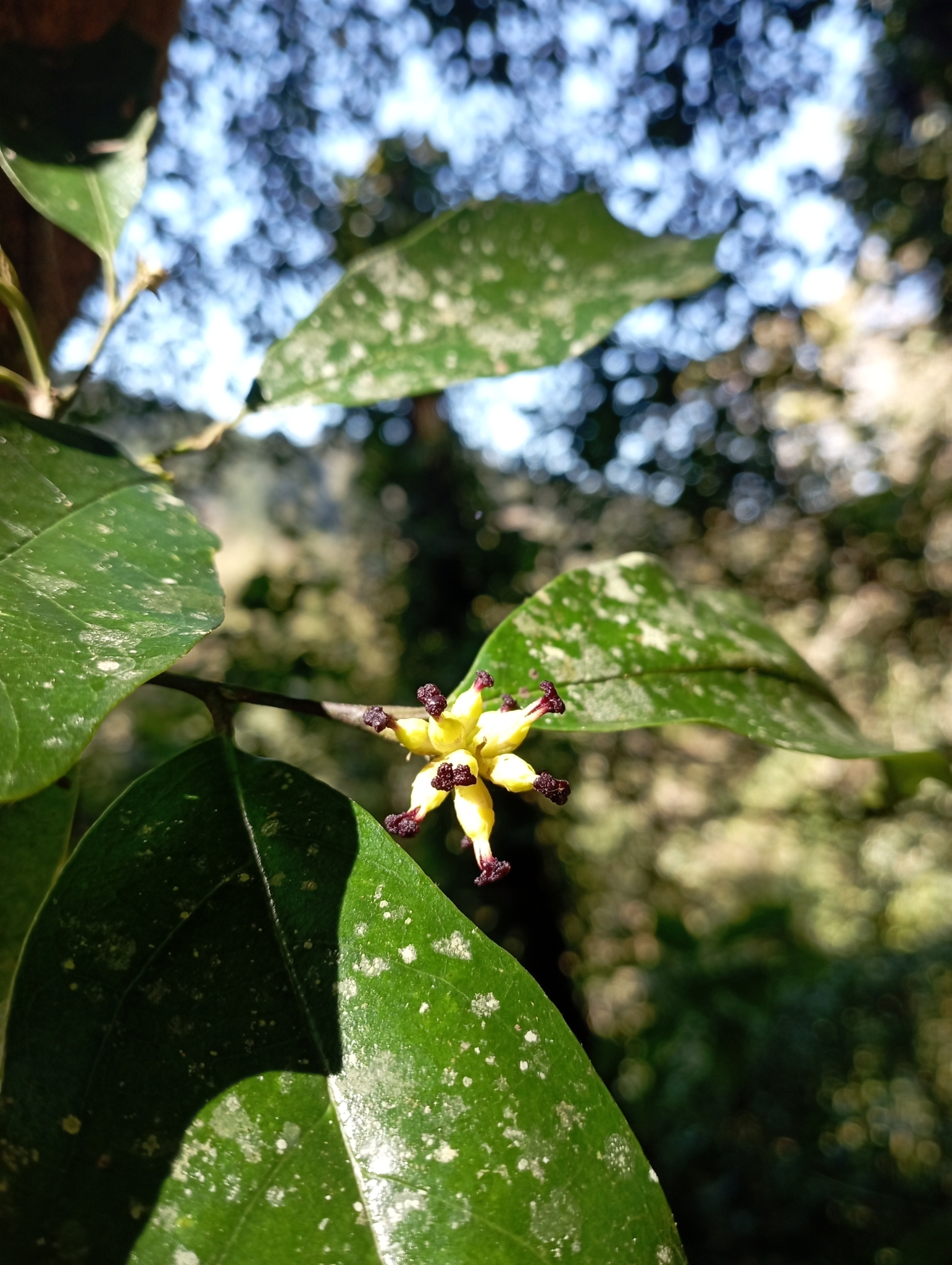
- Eustigma oblongifolium

Scientific classification
- Kingdom: Plantae
- Clade: Tracheophytes
- Clade: Angiosperms
- Clade: Eudicots
- Order: Saxifragales
- Family: Hamamelidaceae
- Subfamily: Hamamelidoideae
- Tribe: Eustigmateae
- Genus: Eustigma; Gardner & Champ.

= Eustigma =

Genus of plants

Eustigma is a genus of flowering plants belonging to the family Hamamelidaceae.

Its native range is Southern Central China to Northern Vietnam and Taiwan.

Species:

- Eustigma balansae Oliv.
- Eustigma honbaense H.Toyama, Tagane & V.S.Dang
- Eustigma lenticellatum C.Y.Wu
- Eustigma oblongifolium Gardner & Champ.
