= Matudaea =

Scientific classification
- Kingdom: Plantae
- Clade: Tracheophytes
- Clade: Angiosperms
- Clade: Eudicots
- Order: Saxifragales
- Family: Hamamelidaceae
- Subfamily: Hamamelidoideae
- Tribe: Loropetaleae
- Genus: Matudaea; Lundell

Genus of flowering plants

Matudaea is a genus of plant in family Hamamelidaceae.

Species of Matudaea range from southern Mexico through Central America to Colombia.

The genus name of Matudaea is in honour of Eizi Matuda (1894–1978), who was a Mexican botanist of Japanese origin.

The genus was circumscribed by Cyrus Longworth Lundell in Lloydia vol.3 on page 209 in 1940.

== Species ==
Two species are accepted.

- Matudaea colombiana Lozano – Colombia
- Matudaea trinervia Lundell – southern Mexico to Costa Rica
