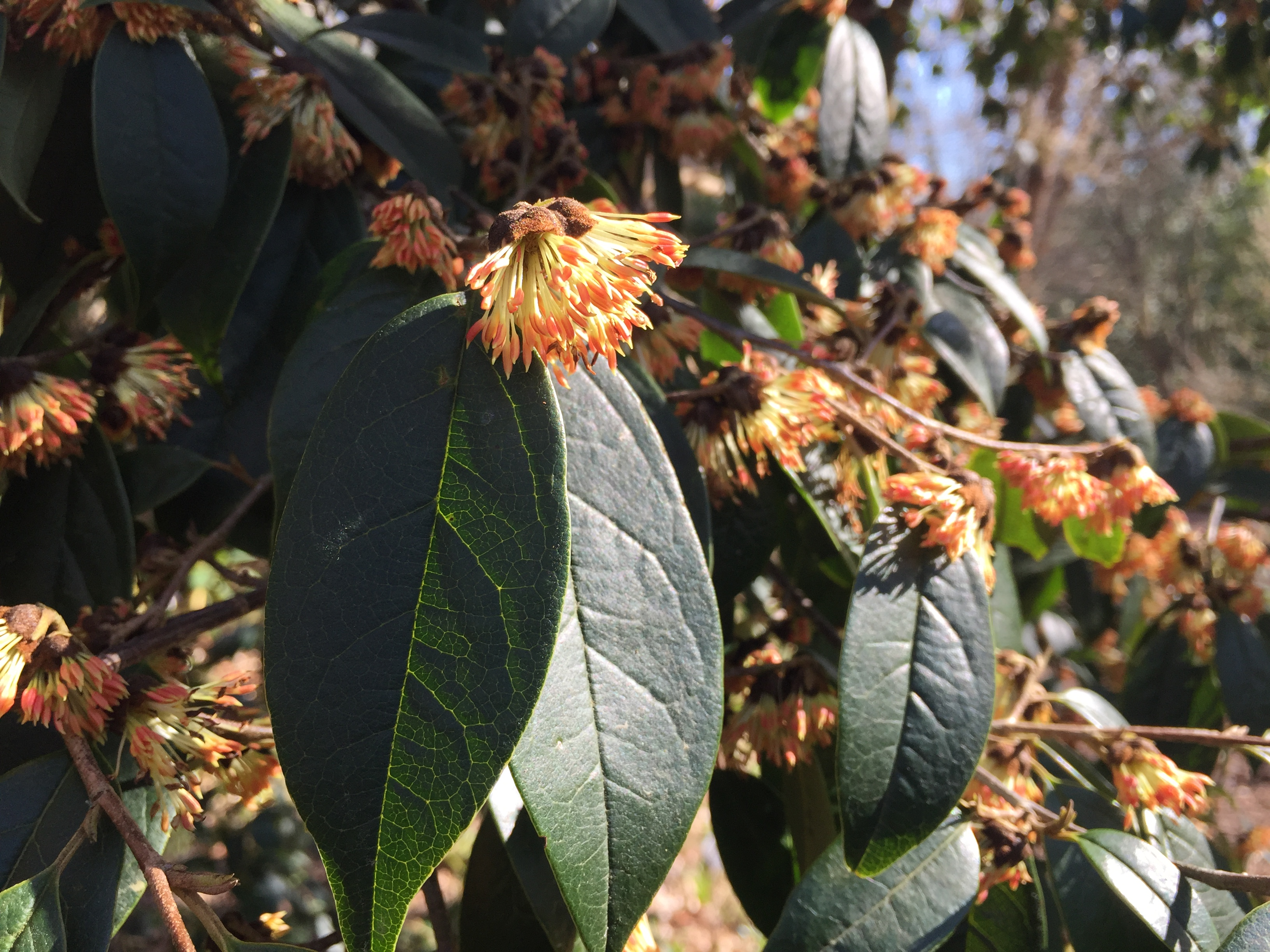
- Sycopsis sinensis

Scientific classification
- Kingdom: Plantae
- Clade: Tracheophytes
- Clade: Angiosperms
- Clade: Eudicots
- Order: Saxifragales
- Family: Hamamelidaceae
- Subfamily: Hamamelidoideae
- Tribe: Fothergilleae
- Genus: Sycopsis; Oliv.

= Sycopsis =

Genus of plants

Sycopsis is a genus of plants in the family Hamamelidaceae. It includes three species native to central and southern China, Assam, and Taiwan.

== Characteristics ==
Sycopsis are evergreen or semi-evergreen shrubs or small trees. Their leaves are leathery and their flowers have no petals.

== Species ==
Three species are accepted.

- Sycopsis griffithiana Oliv.
- Sycopsis sinensis Oliv.
- Sycopsis triplinerva H.T.Chang

== Etymology and naming ==
Sycopsis is derived from Greek and means ‘fig-resembler’ because the person who named the genus, Daniel Oliver, thought its appearance resembled a shrubby Ficus.

The Chinese vernacular name for this genus is 水丝梨属 (Shuǐ sī lí shǔ).
