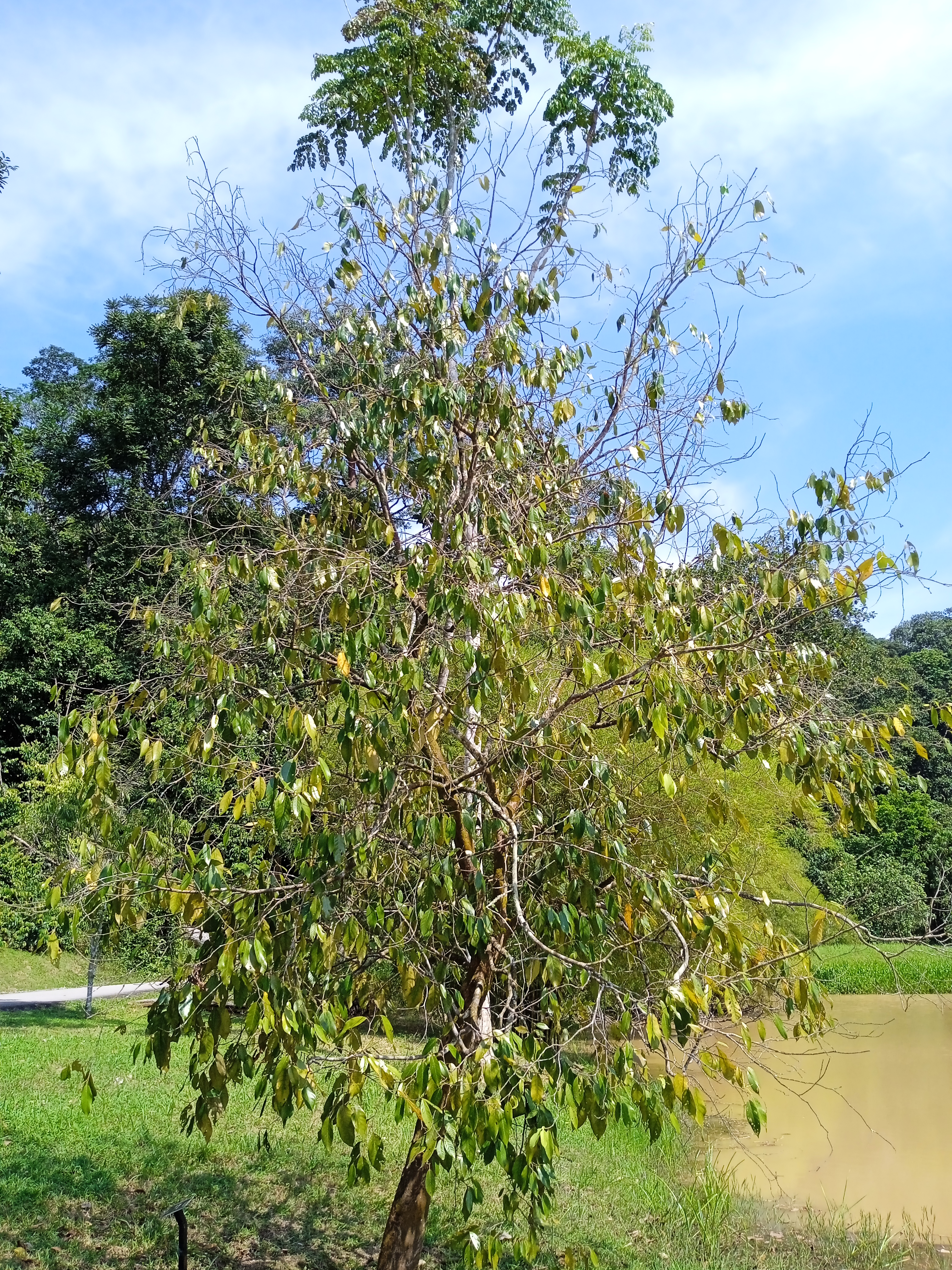

Conservation status
- Vulnerable (IUCN 2.3)

Scientific classification
- Kingdom: Plantae
- Clade: Tracheophytes
- Clade: Angiosperms
- Clade: Eudicots
- Order: Saxifragales
- Family: Hamamelidaceae
- Subfamily: Hamamelidoideae
- Tribe: Loropetaleae
- Genus: Maingaya; Oliv.
- Species: M. malayana

Binomial name
- Maingaya malayana Oliv.

= Maingaya =

Genus of trees

Maingaya is a monotypic genus of plant containing the sole species Maingaya malayana. It is a tree endemic to Peninsular Malaysia. It is threatened by habitat loss.

== Gallery ==
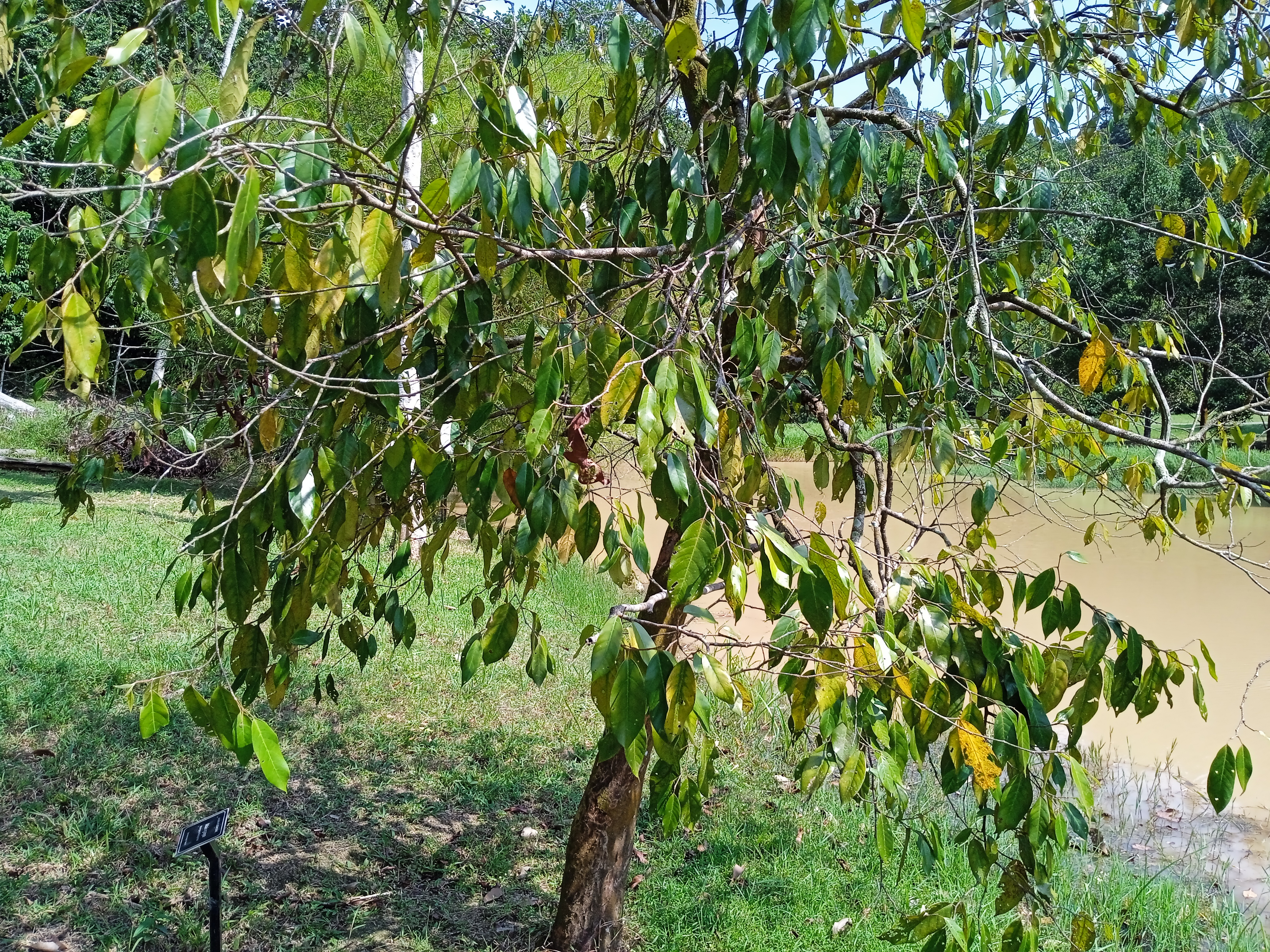
Maingaya malayana leaves

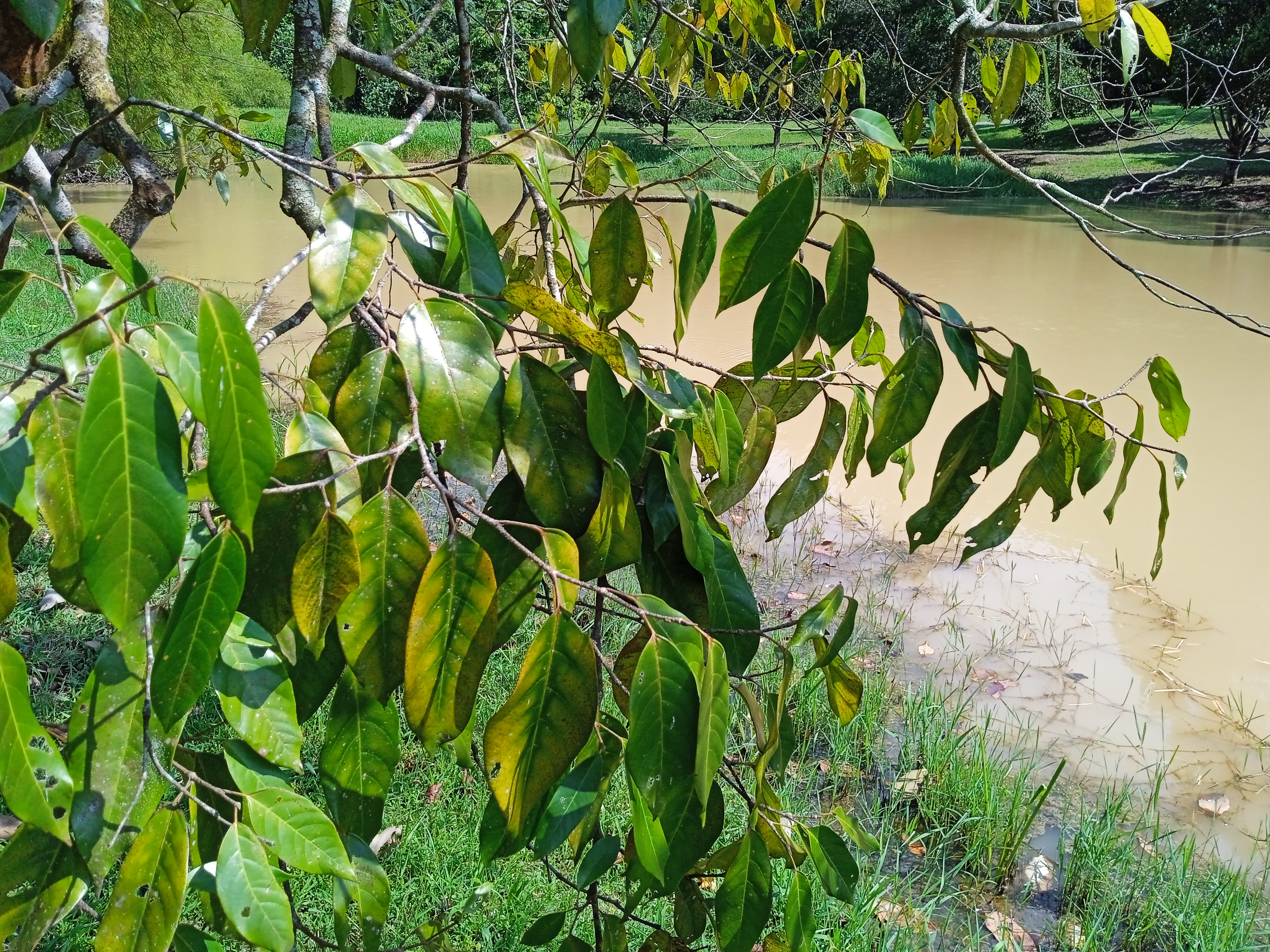
Maingaya malayana leaves
