= Embolanthera =

Scientific classification
- Kingdom: Plantae
- Clade: Tracheophytes
- Clade: Angiosperms
- Clade: Eudicots
- Order: Saxifragales
- Family: Hamamelidaceae
- Subfamily: Hamamelidoideae
- Tribe: Loropetaleae
- Genus: Embolanthera; Merr.

Genus of plants

Embolanthera is a genus of flowering plants belonging to the family Hamamelidaceae.

Its native range is Southern Vietnam, Western Philippines.

Species:

- Embolanthera glabrescens H.L.Li
- Embolanthera spicata Merr.
