= Quangnamia =

Scientific classification
- Kingdom: Plantae
- Clade: Tracheophytes
- Clade: Angiosperms
- Clade: Eudicots
- Order: Saxifragales
- Family: Hamamelidaceae
- Genus: Quangnamia; K.S.Nguyen & Aver.
- Species: Q. syncarpa

Binomial name
- Quangnamia syncarpa K.S.Nguyen, Aver., C.W.Lin, G.Q.Liu & H.H.Truong

Genus of flowering plants

Quangnamia is a genus of flowering plants in the witch hazel family, Hamamelidaceae. It includes a single species, Quangnamia syncarpa, a tree endemic to central Vietnam.

The species is an evergreen hermaphroditic treelet or tree, which grows from 10 to 25 meters tall. Flowers and fruits were observed in January and in May. It was discovered in primary and secondary lowland broadleaf evergreen forest in the Annamite Range of Đại Lộc district of Quảng Nam province, growing on sandstone substrates from 400 to 600 meters elevation. It typically grows along small rocky streams and on eroded sandstone cliffs.

The genus and species were first described in 2024. The genus name refers to Quảng Nam province, where the plant was discovered. The specific epithet refers to its syncarpous fruit, which contains two seeds.
