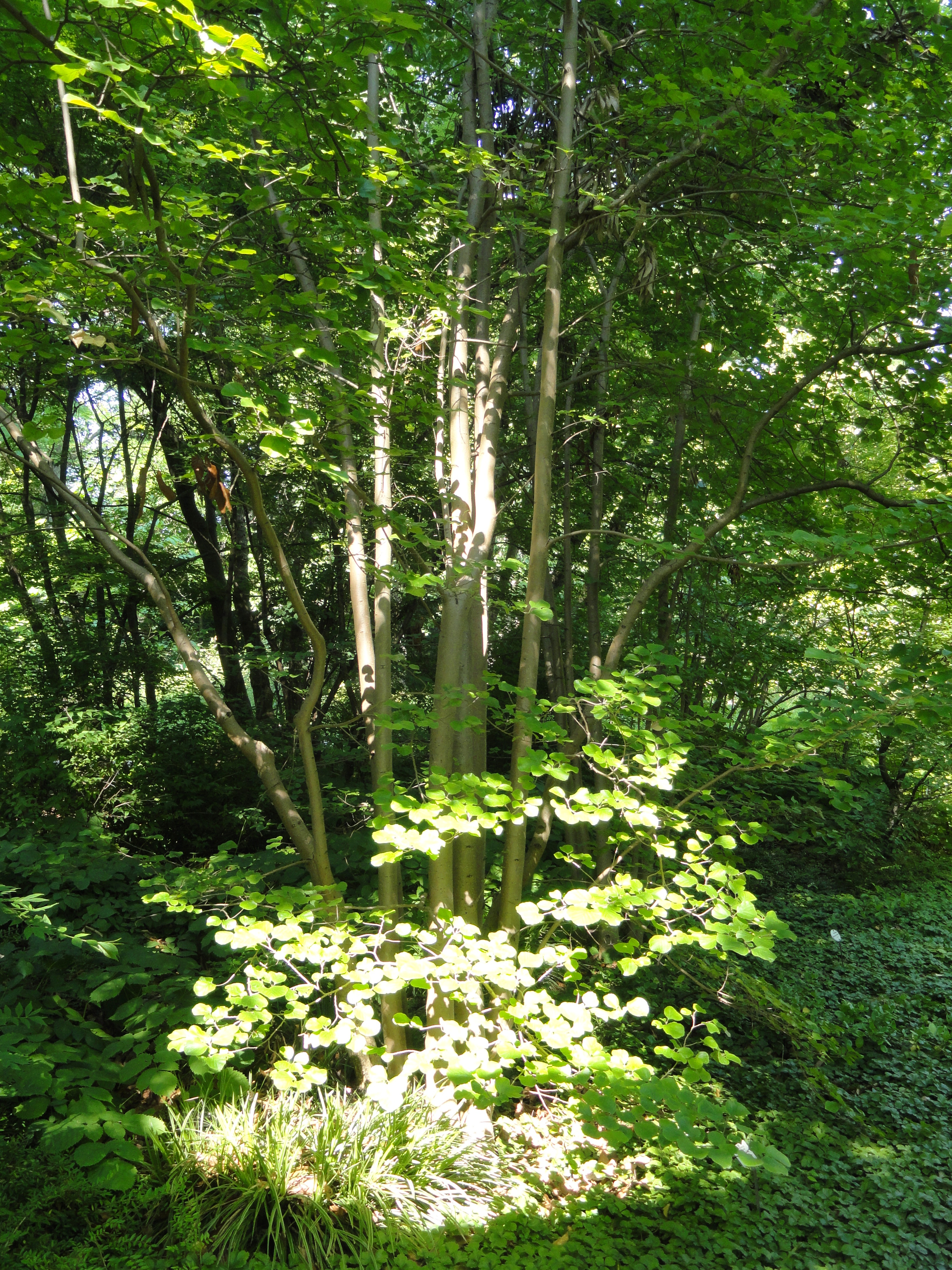
- Parrotiopsis jacquemontiana

Conservation status
- Least Concern (IUCN 3.1)

Scientific classification
- Kingdom: Plantae
- Clade: Tracheophytes
- Clade: Angiosperms
- Clade: Eudicots
- Order: Saxifragales
- Family: Hamamelidaceae
- Tribe: Fothergilleae
- Genus: Parrotiopsis; C.K.Schneid.
- Species: P. jacquemontiana

Binomial name
- Parrotiopsis jacquemontiana (Decne.) Rehder

Synonyms
- Fothergilla involucrata Falc.; Parrotia jacquemontiana Decne. (1841) (species basionym); Parrotiopsis involucrata (Falc.) C.K.Schneid.

= Parrotiopsis =

Genus of shrubs

Parrotiopsis is a genus flowering plants in the witch hazel family. It includes a single species, Parrotiopsis jacquemontiana, a deciduous shrub or small tree in the witch hazel family, native to the western Himalayas, particularly Kashmir, Murree, Hazara, the Swat District, and Kurram, from 1200 to 2800 meters elevation. It grows to 6 meters (20 feet) in height by 4 meters (13 feet) wide, with hermaphrodite flowers borne in dense tufts of stamens from April to June. Its wood is strong and often used for handles, walking sticks, etc. Twigs are used for baskets and rope.
