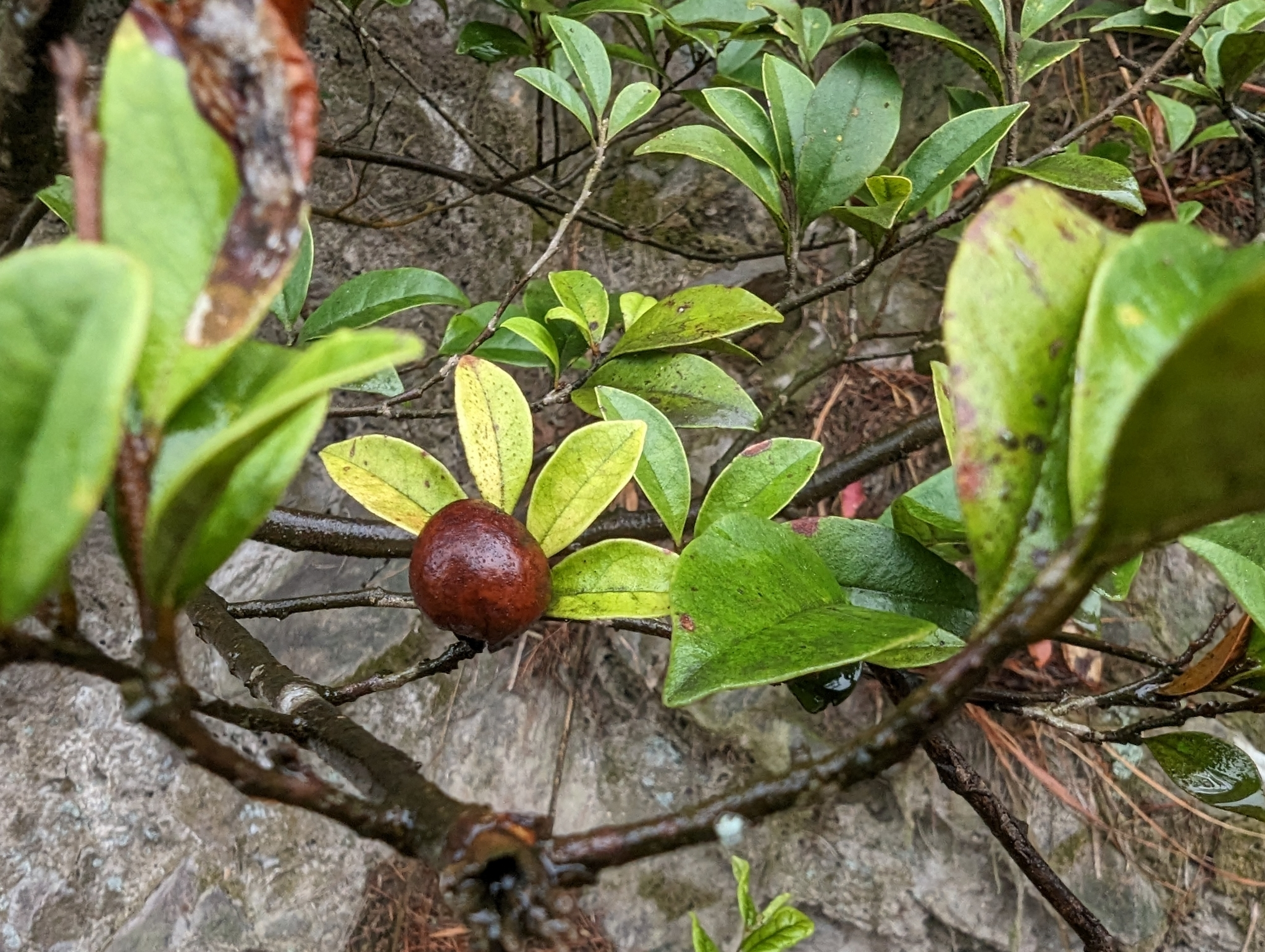
- Distyliopsis dunnii

Scientific classification
- Kingdom: Plantae
- Clade: Tracheophytes
- Clade: Angiosperms
- Clade: Eudicots
- Order: Saxifragales
- Family: Hamamelidaceae
- Subfamily: Hamamelidoideae
- Tribe: Fothergilleae
- Genus: Distyliopsis; Endress

= Distyliopsis =

Genus of plants

Distyliopsis is a genus of flowering plants belonging to the family Hamamelidaceae.

Its native range is Tropical and Subtropical Asia.

Species:

- Distyliopsis dunnii (Hemsl.) Endress
- Distyliopsis lanata N.A.Brummitt & Utteridge
- Distyliopsis laurifolia (Hemsl.) Endress
- Distyliopsis salicifolia (H.L.Li & E.Walker) Endress
- Distyliopsis tutcheri (Hemsl.) Endress
- Distyliopsis yunnanensis (H.T.Chang) C.Y.Wu
