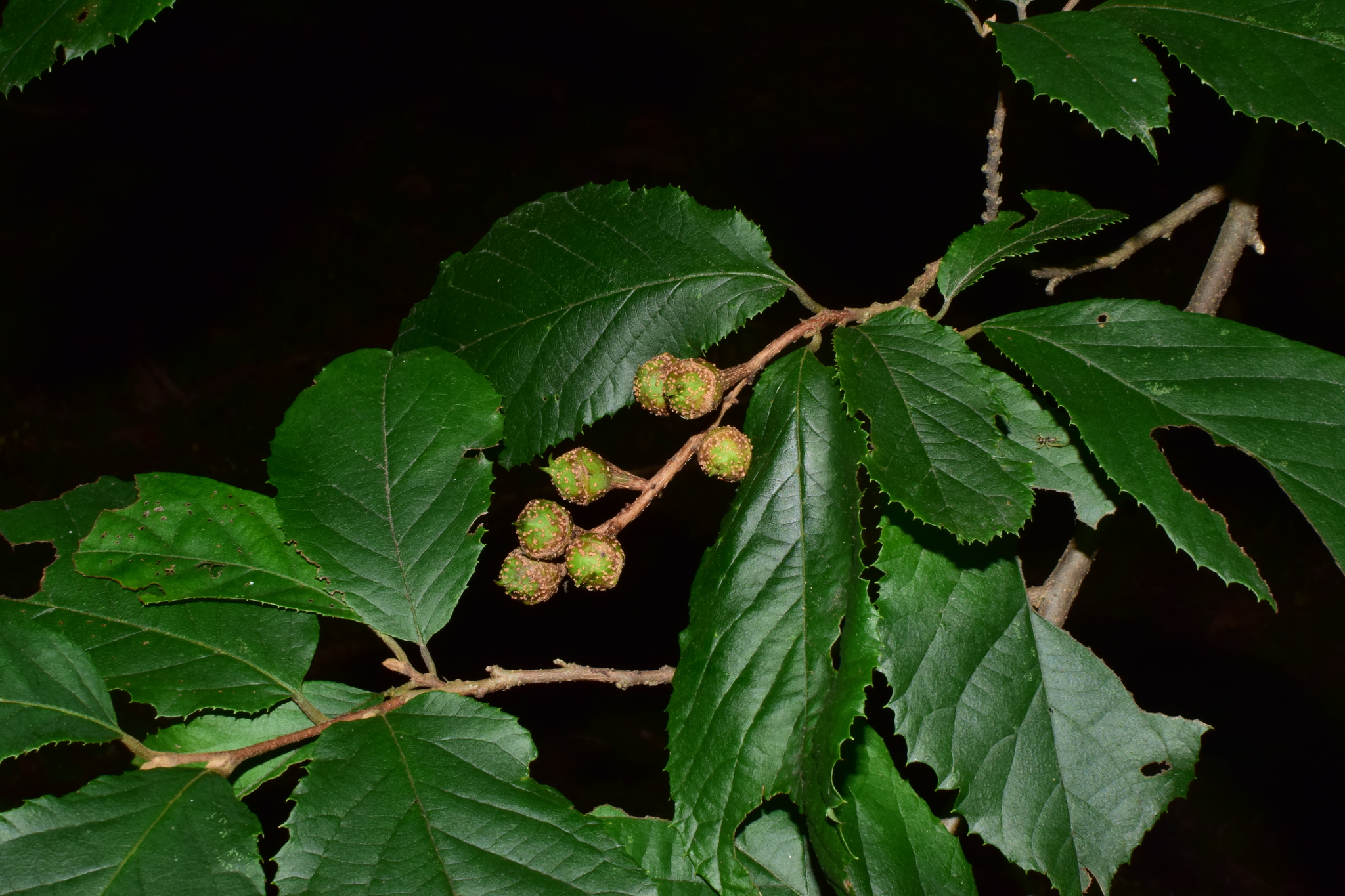
- Fortunearia sinensis

Scientific classification
- Kingdom: Plantae
- Clade: Tracheophytes
- Clade: Angiosperms
- Clade: Eudicots
- Order: Saxifragales
- Family: Hamamelidaceae
- Tribe: Eustigmateae
- Genus: Fortunearia; Rehder & E.H.Wilson (1913)
- Species: F. sinensis

Binomial name
- Fortunearia sinensis Rehder & E.H.Wilson (1913)

= Fortunearia =

Genus of flowering plants

Fortunearia is a monotypic genus of flowering plants belonging to the family Hamamelidaceae. It just contains one species, Fortunearia sinensis Rehder & E.H.Wilson, a shrub or tree native to southern and north-central China.

Its genus name is in honour of Robert Fortune (1812–1880), Scottish botanist, plant hunter and traveller in Asia, and the specific epithet sinensis means "from China".

It was first described and published in Plantae Wilsonianae Vol.1 on page 427 in 1913.
