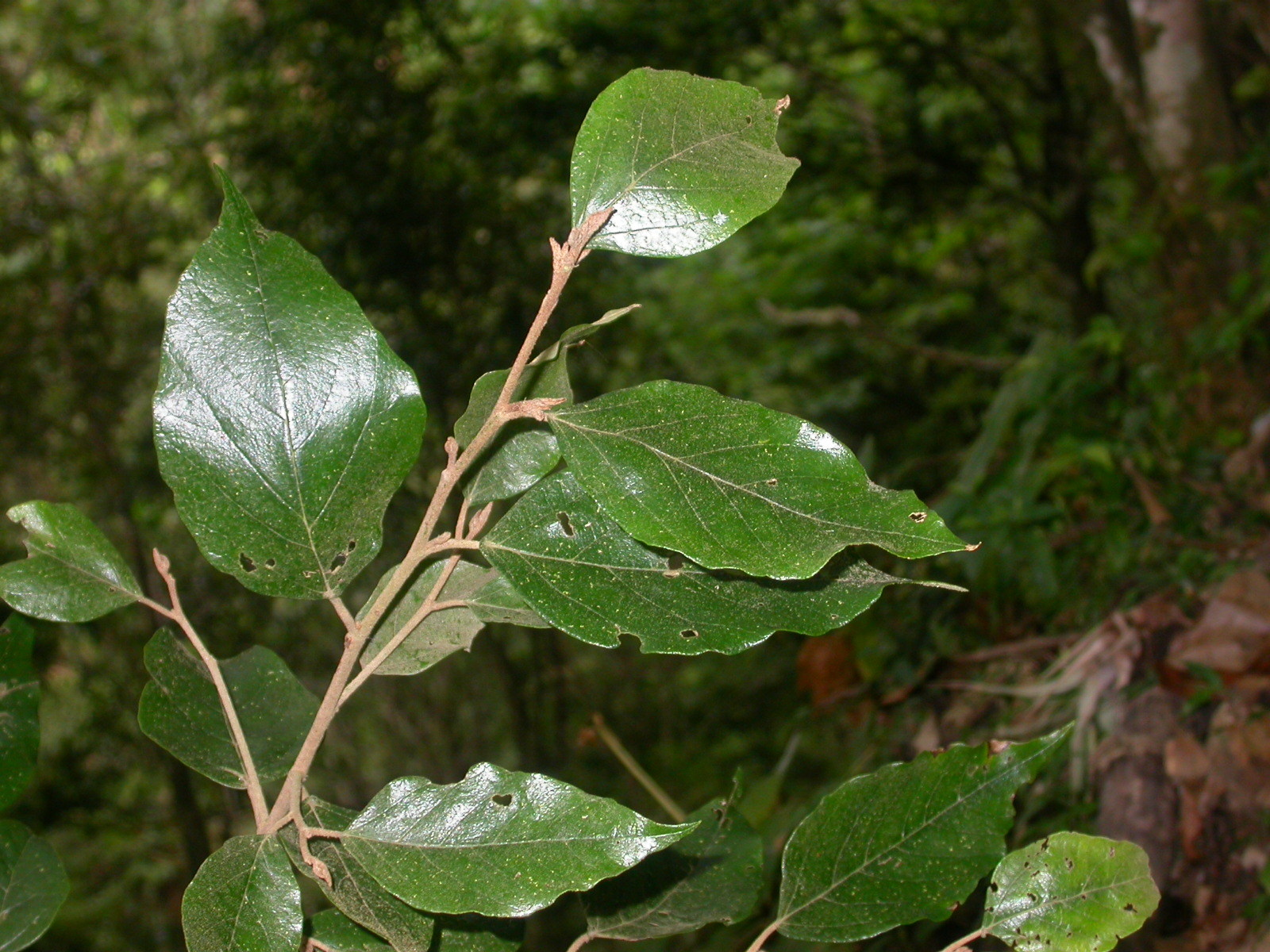
- Molinadendron guatemalense

Scientific classification
- Kingdom: Plantae
- Clade: Tracheophytes
- Clade: Angiosperms
- Clade: Eudicots
- Order: Saxifragales
- Family: Hamamelidaceae
- Subfamily: Hamamelidoideae
- Tribe: Eustigmateae
- Genus: Molinadendron; P.K.Endress

Species
- Molinadendron guatemalense (Radlk. ex Harms) P.K.Endress; Molinadendron hondurense (Standl.) P.K.Endress; Molinadendron sinaloense (Standl. & Gentry) P.K.Endress

= Molinadendron =

Genus of flowering plants

Molinadendron is a genus of the Hamamelidaceae family, order Saxifragales, containing three reported species: Molinadendron guatemalense, Molinadendron hondurense, and Molinadendron sinaloense. Relatives include witch-hazel and winter-hazel.

Molinadendron sinaloense is an evergreen tree native to the woodlands of western Mexico. It reaches a height of up to 20 ft (6.2 m). Leaves are oval, tapered, 3-6 inch (7.6-15.2 cm) in length, opening purplish and coppery on graceful branches.
