= Mytilaria =

Scientific classification
- Kingdom: Plantae
- Clade: Tracheophytes
- Clade: Angiosperms
- Clade: Eudicots
- Order: Saxifragales
- Family: Hamamelidaceae
- Genus: Mytilaria; Lecomte
- Species: M. laosensis

Binomial name
- Mytilaria laosensis Lecomte

Genus of plants

Mytilaria is a genus of flowering plants belonging to the family Hamamelidaceae. It includes a single species, Mytilaria laosensis, a tree native to southern China (southeastern Yunnan, western Guangdong, and western Guangxi), Laos, and Vietnam.
