= Chunia =

Conservation status
- Vulnerable (IUCN 2.3)

Scientific classification
- Kingdom: Plantae
- Clade: Tracheophytes
- Clade: Angiosperms
- Clade: Eudicots
- Order: Saxifragales
- Family: Hamamelidaceae
- Genus: Chunia; H.T.Chang (1848)
- Species: C. bucklandioides

Binomial name
- Chunia bucklandioides H.T.Chang (1848)

Genus of flowering plants

Chunia bucklandioides is a species of flowering plant belonging to the family Hamamelidaceae. It is a tree native to Hainan and northern Vietnam. It is the sole species in genus Chunia.

It is a medium-sized tree, growing up to 30 meters tall with a trunk up to 50 cm in diameter. It has scabrous dark brown bark with gray patches. Leaves are alternate and vary in size and shape, from simple to three-lobed, with ovate and deltoid to subcordate leaf blades 9 to 15 cm long by 8 to 13 cm wide. Inflorescences are spicate and terminal with 12 to 16 bisexual flowers absent sepals and petals, and enclosed by two caducous bract-like stipules. It flowers from December to February and fruits from March to June.

On Hainan it is known from the Dialuo and Jingfeng mountains, where it grows in forested gullies from 600 to 700 meters elevation. Subpopulations in Ding'an Qiongzhong, Baoting, and Yaxian have since disappeared. In Vietnam it is known from a single population near Na Nheo village in Lào Cai province, where it grows at the edges of evergreen broadleaf forests on mountain slopes, in wet valleys, and along stream margins from 400 to 500 meters elevation.
