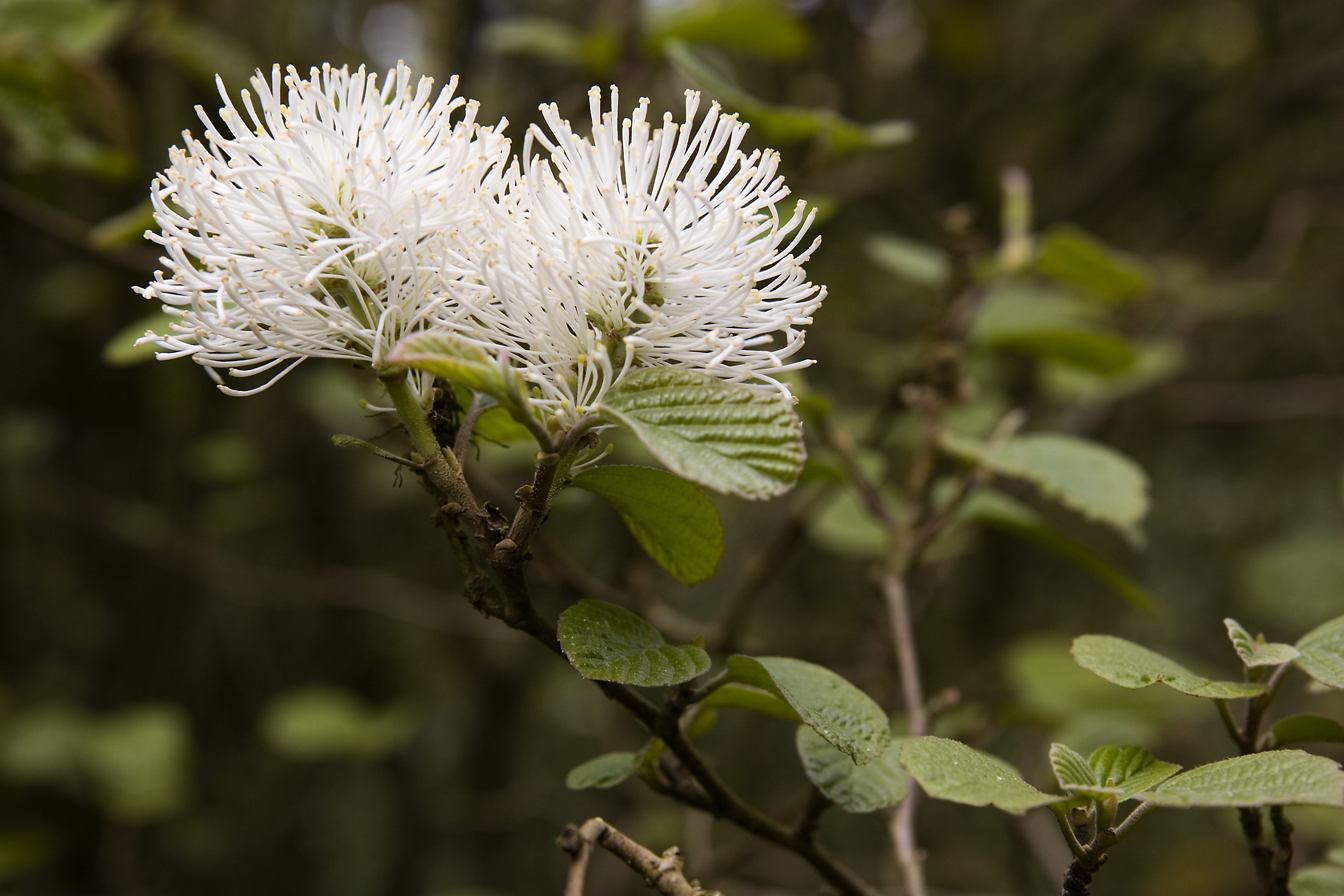
- Fothergilla major (Witch alder)

Scientific classification
- Kingdom: Plantae
- Clade: Tracheophytes
- Clade: Angiosperms
- Clade: Eudicots
- Order: Saxifragales
- Family: Hamamelidaceae; R.Br.

Type genus
- Hamamelis L.

Subfamilies
- See text
- The range of Hamamelidaceae.

= Hamamelidaceae =

Hamamelidaceae Temporal range: Ypresian–Present

Witch-hazel, a shrub or small tree

Hamamelidaceae, commonly referred to as the witch-hazel family, is a family of flowering plants in the order Saxifragales. The clade consists of shrubs and small trees positioned within the woody clade of the core Saxifragales. An earlier system, the Cronquist system, recognized Hamamelidaceae in the Hamamelidales order.

== Description ==
The Hamamelidaceae are distinguishable from other families in the Saxifragales due to the range of floral characteristics that are generally uniform through all genera. Uniform characteristics include stipules borne on stems with leaves often 2-ranked. Genera usually have a two carpel gynoecium, although some species show variation. Other characteristics include a multicellular stigma, with shallow papillae or ridges.

=== Anthers ===
Anther structure and the modes of opening are considered to be one of the most important features in the systematics and evolution of Hamamelids. The anthers in Hamamelids are on average shorter than in other families in the Saxifragales. The anther valve openings are unique pleismorphic features that contrast with the simple longitudinal slits of the anthers in the upper Hamamelidae where the pollen is predominantly wind-driven.

The three types of anthers found in the Hamamelidaceae are:

- Type 1) The theca (or sheath of anther) opens like a window with two wings; a common anther type.
- Type 2) There is one valve opening to reveal two pollen sacs. Five genera in the Hamamelidoideae subfamily, confined to the Southern Hemisphere (Trichcladus, Dicoryphe, Ostrearia, Neostrearia, Noahdendron) are known to have this anther type.
- Type 3) One valve opens a wing of anther tissue towards the center of the flower revealing one pollen sac. The two genera, Exbucklandia and Hamamelis are known to have this anther type.

=== Pollen ===
Plants of the Hamamelidaceae have sticky pollen, which may have influenced the type of pollination that is seen in this family. Pollination is predominantly via insects or wind. However, the insect-pollinated genus Disanthus has been known to wind-pollinate (although inefficiently) in the event pollinators do not visit its flowers. The genus Rhodoleia is unique because it is bird-pollinated.

The pollen structure in the lower Hamamelidae is relatively uniform. The pollen patterns are tricolpate with reticulate exines.

=== Flowers ===
The petals of the Hamamelidaceae are generally narrow and ribbon-like. The exceptions are the genera Corylopsis and Rhodoleia, which have spathulate or circular-like petals.

The flowers of Hamamelidaceae are mostly bisexual with perianth parts, which mature to fruits arranged in spikes, racemes or nonglobose heads.

=== Breeding systems ===
The anemophilous groups within the Hamamelidaceae are often andromonoecious. Self-incompatibility is common, but self-compatibility occurs in some genera such as Hamamelis.

== Taxonomy ==
The fossil record dates from the Eocene. Hamamelidaceae was established by Brown in 1818 as the Hamamelideae, including four genera. The phylogenetic relationship of the Hamamelidaceae have been revisited several times since the first comprehensive classification of the family in 1930. This was clarified in 1998 by the molecular phylogenetic work of the Angiosperm Phylogeny Group (APG) which placed the family within the eudicot order Saxifragales. In doing so, it separated one of the existing subfamilies, the Altingioideae, which formed the basal group, into its own family within the order, the Altingiaceae.

Cladogram of Saxifragales families

- Saxifragales
  - Peridiscaceae (4)
  - 97
    - - Paeonia (Paeoniaceae)
      - woody clade
        - Liquidambar (Altingiaceae)
        - 69
          - 98
            Hamamelidaceae (27)
          - 95
            - Cercidiphyllum (Cercidiphyllaceae)
            - Daphniphyllum (Daphniphyllaceae)
    - core Saxifragales
      - - Crassulaceae (34)
        - Haloragaceaes.l.
          - Aphanopetalum (Aphanopetalaceae)
          - - Tetracarpaea (Tetracarpaeaceae)
            - - Penthorum (Penthoraceae)
              - Haloragaceae s.s. (8)
      - Saxifragaceae alliance
        - - Iteaceae (including Pterostemonaceae) (2)
        - - Ribes (Grossulariaceae)
          - Saxifragaceae (33)

Cynomorium (Cynomoriaceae) remains unplaced within this tree

=== Subdivision ===
==== Subfamilies ====
The infrafamilial classification of the Hamamelidaceae has been controversial, and has undergone a number of revisions based on morphology, the best known of which are those of Harms (1930) and Endress (1989).

Morphological and DNA studies have supported monophyly of the Hamamelidoideae and have recognized the separation of the Rhodoleioideae and Disanthoideae subfamily and newly erected Mytilarioideae.

The relationships between Exbucklandioideae and the other subfamilies have proven controversial. The unresolved monophyly of Exbucklandioideae and the clades of Disanthoideae, Rhodoleioideae, Exbucklandioideae or even Mytilarioideae being a sister clade to Hamamelidoideae may have been a result of differing DNA methodologies researchers have used to produce phylogenetic trees and the inclusion or exclusion of certain genera used as outgroups in their analyses. However, the sister relationship of Disanthoideae and Hamamelidoideae has been well supported, although some researchers do not support this. Strong support for making Altingioideae a family has been recognized by textbooks and the Angiosperm Phylogeny Group. Research continues to resolve the deep relationships of the subfamilies within the Hamamelidaceae by incorporating whole or fragmentary fossil evidence.

Hamamelidaceae contains 27-30 genera and 80-140 species distributed among five to six subfamilies. The subfamilies are Exbucklandioideae, Rhodoleioideae, Mytilarioideae, Disanthoideae, Hamamelidoideae, and Altingioideae, which has been elevated to a family Altingiaceae in some recent treatments. Many of the subfamilies are monotypic and the majority of the species lie within the Hamamelidoideae, which has 22 genera.

The long-standing question of whether Altingioideae should be a separate family has been assessed and supported by morphological and molecular phylogenetic studies. The resulting subfamilial structure was eventually resolved in a series of molecular studies in the late 1990s, resulting in five distinct subfamilies, the majority of the genera residing in the nominative subfamily, Hamamelidoideae:

Subfamilies (number of genera)

- Exbucklandioideae (1 genus; Exbucklandia)
- Rhodoleioideae (1 genus; Rhodoleia)
- Mytilarioideae (2 genera; Mytilaria, Chunia)
- Disanthoideae (1 genus; Disanthus)
- Hamamelidoideae (22 genera; see Tribes below)

==== Tribes ====
The relatively large size of subfamily Hamamelidoideae and its further subdivision into tribes has also been a matter of study and controversy. Six tribes are now recognized. The revised structure has greatly reduced Hamamelideae to a monotypic taxon, which had previously been further divided into subtribes:

- Corylopsideae (1 genus; Corylopsis)
- Dicorypheae (5 genera; Dicoryphe, Trichocladus, Neostrearia, Noahdendron, Ostrearia)
- Eustigmateae (4 genera; Eustigma, Fortunearia, Sinowilsonia, Molinadendron)
- Fothergilleae (7 genera; Fothergilla, Parrotiopsis, Parrotia, Shaniodendron, Sycopsis, Distylium, Distyliopsis)
- Hamamelideae (1 genus; Hamamelis)
- Loropetaleae (4 genera; Loropetalum (including Tetrathyrium), Maingaya, Embolanthera, Matudaea)

==== Genera ====
27 genera are accepted.

- Chunia H.T.Chang – 1 species, Hainan and Vietnam
- Corylopsis Siebold & Zucc. – winter-hazel; about 30 species, east Asia
- Dicoryphe Thouars – 13 species, Madagascar and Mayotte
- Disanthus Maxim. – 1 species, east Asia
- Distyliopsis Endress – 6 species, southern China to New Guinea
- Distylium Siebold & Zucc., 16 species, east Asia and Himalayas
- Embolanthera Merr. – 2 species, Philippines and Vietnam
- Eustigma Gardner & Champ. – 4 species, China, Indochina, and Taiwan
- Exbucklandia R.W.Br. – 3 species, Assam, China, and southeast Asia
- Fortunearia Rehder & E.H.Wilson – 1 species, eastern China
- Fothergilla L. – fothergilla; 3 species, southeastern United States)
- Hamamelis Gronov. ex L. – witch-hazel; 4 species, eastern North America and east Asia
- †Langeria Wolfe) & Wehr – Eocene, 1 species
- Loropetalum R.Br. ex Rchb. – three species, east Asia
- Maingaya Oliv. – 1 species, Peninsular Malaysia and Thailand
- Matudaea Lundell – 2 species, southern Mexico, Central America, and Colombia
- Molinadendron P.K.Endress – 3 species, northwestern Mexico and central America
- Mytilaria Lecomte – 1 species, southern China, Laos, and Vietnam
- Neostrearia L.S.Sm. – 1 species, northeastern Queensland
- Noahdendron P.K.Endress, B.Hyland & Tracey – 1 species, northeastern Queensland
- Ostrearia Baill. ex Nied. – 1 species, Queensland
- Parrotia C.A.Mey. – Ironwoods; 2 species, disjunct in southwest Asia and eastern China
- Parrotiopsis C.K.Schneid. – 1 species, Himalaya
- Quangnamia K.S.Nguyen & Aver. – 1 species, Vietnam
- Rhodoleia Champ. ex Hook. – 6 species, southeast Asia
- Sinowilsonia – 1 species, western China
- Sycopsis Hemsl. – 3 species, China and Assam
- Trichocladus Pers. – 4 species, eastern and southern Africa

== Distribution and habitat ==
The Hamamelidaceae were widely distributed in the Northern Hemisphere during the Upper Cretaceous and early Tertiary. Quaternary glaciation across the Northern Hemisphere caused the extinction of numerous species and the restricted distribution of others. Hamamelidaceae were obliterated from Europe along with numerous other genera of plants that were unable to escape the ice sheets due to geography (the Mediterranean Sea and Alps forming barriers that did not exist in North America and Asia).

The largest subfamily, the Hamamelidoideae, is now distributed in North America and western and eastern Asia. The Hamamelidoideae subtribe Dicoryphinae is now restricted to the African (including Madagascar and Comores) and Australian continents. Disanthoideae and Rhodoleioideae are now restricted to southern China and the Caucasus region. Mytilarioideae is restricted to eastern Asia. Altingioideae is now restricted to eastern Asia and western Asia and North America between central Mexico and Belize.

== Bibliography ==
=== Books and theses ===
- Brown, Robert (1818). Characters and Descriptions of Three New Species of Plants. Extracted from the 'Narrative of a Journey in the Interior of China', by Clarke Abel, Esq., pp. 374–379. Longman, London.
- Byng, James W. (2014). "Saxifragales". The Flowering Plants Handbook: A practical guide to families and genera of the world. Plant Gateway Ltd. pp. 156–166. ISBN 978-0-9929993-1-5.
- Christenhusz, Maarten J. M.; Fay, Michael F.; Chase, Mark W. (2017). "Saxifragales". Plants of the World: An Illustrated Encyclopedia of Vascular Plants. University of Chicago Press. pp. 231–244. ISBN 978-0-226-52292-0.
- Harms, H. (1930). "Hamamelidaceae". In Engler, Adolf; Prantl, Karl Anton (eds.). Die Natürlichen Pflanzenfamilien. Vol. 18A. Leipzig: Verlag von Wilhelm Engelmann. pp. 330–343.
- Li, Jianhua (December 1997). Systematics of the Hamamelidaceae based on morphological and molecular evidence (PhD thesis). Department of Plant Biology, University of New Hampshire.
- Ludvigsen, Rolf (2011). "Eocene compression floras". Life in Stone: A Natural History of British Columbia's Fossils. UBC Press. p. 243. ISBN 978-0774841511.

=== Articles ===
- Endress, Peter K. (1989). "A suprageneric taxonomic classification of the Hamamelidaceae". Taxon. 38 (3): 371–376. doi:10.2307/1222267. JSTOR 1222267.
- Gapinski, Andrew (2014). "Hamamelidaceae, Part 1: Exploring the Witch-hazels of the Arnold Arboretum" (PDF). Arnoldia. 72 (2): 2–17. Archived from the original (PDF) on 2020-01-03.
- Gapinski, Andrew (2015). "Hamamelidaceae, Part 2: Exploring the Witch-hazel Relatives of the Arnold Arboretum" (PDF). Arnoldia. 72 (4): 20–35. Archived from the original (PDF) on September 6, 2015.
- Jian, Shuguang; Soltis, Pamela S.; Gitzendanner, Matthew A.; Moore, Michael J.; Li, Ruiqi; Hendry, Tory A.; Qiu, Yin-Long; Dhingra, Amit; Bell, Charles D.; Soltis, Douglas E. (February 2008). "Resolving an ancient, rapid radiation in Saxifragales". Systematic Biology. 57 (1): 38–57. doi:10.1080/10635150801888871. PMID 18275001.
- Li, Jianhua; Bogle, A. Linn; Klein, Anita S. (September 1999). "Phylogenetic relationships in the Hamamelidaceae: Evidence from the nucleotide sequences of the plastid gene matK". Plant Systematics and Evolution. 218 (3–4): 205–219. doi:10.1007/BF01089228. S2CID 25179689.
- Li, Jianhua; Bogle, A. Linn; Klein, Anita S. (July 1999). "Phylogenetic relationships of the Hamamelidaceae inferred from sequences of internal transcribed spacers (ITS) of nuclear ribosomal DNA". American Journal of Botany. 86 (7): 1027–1037. doi:10.2307/2656620. JSTOR 2656620. PMID 10406726.
- Li, Jianhua; Bogle, A. Linn (2001). "A new suprageneric classification system of the Hamamelidoideae based on morphology and sequences of nuclear and chloroplast DNA". Harvard Papers in Botany. 5 (2): 499–515. ISSN 1043-4534. JSTOR 41761618.
- Petruzzello, Melissa (12 September 2017). Hamamelidaceae. Encyclopædia Britannica.
- Shi, Suhua; Chang, H.T.; Chen, Yueqing; Qu, Lianghu; Wen, Jun (January 1998). "Phylogeny of the Hamamelidaceae based on the ITS sequences of nuclear ribosomal DNA". Biochemical Systematics and Ecology. 26 (1): 55–69. doi:10.1016/s0305-1978(97)00075-6.

APG

- Angiosperm Phylogeny Group (1998), "An ordinal classification for the families of flowering plants", Annals of the Missouri Botanical Garden, 85 (4): 531–553, doi:10.2307/2992015, JSTOR 2992015
- Angiosperm Phylogeny Group II (2003), "An update of the Angiosperm Phylogeny Group classification for the orders and families of flowering plants: APG II" (PDF), Botanical Journal of the Linnean Society, 141 (4), Bremer, B., K. Bremer, M.W. Chase, J.L. Reveal, D.E. Soltis, P.S. Soltis & P.F. Stevens: 399–436, doi:10.1046/j.1095-8339.2003.t01-1-00158.x, archived from the original (PDF) on 2020-10-22
- Angiosperm Phylogeny Group III (2009), "An update of the Angiosperm Phylogeny Group classification for the orders and families of flowering plants: APG III", Botanical Journal of the Linnean Society, 161 (2), Bremer, B., K. Bremer, M.W. Chase, M.F. Fay, J.L. Reveal, D.E. Soltis, P.S. Soltis & P.F. Stevens: 105–121, doi:10.1111/j.1095-8339.2009.00996.x, hdl:10654/18083
- Angiosperm Phylogeny Group IV (2016). "An update of the Angiosperm Phylogeny Group classification for the orders and families of flowering plants: APG IV". Botanical Journal of the Linnean Society. 181 (1): 1–20. doi:10.1111/boj.12385.

=== Websites ===
- Cole, Theodor C. H.; Hilger, Hartmut H.; Stevens, Peter F. (May 2019), Angiosperm Phylogeny Poster - Flowering Plant Systematics (PDF), archived from the original (PDF) on 17 May 2017
- Stevens, P.F. (2019) [2001]. "Saxifragales". AP Web v. 14. Missouri Botanical Garden. (see also Angiosperm Phylogeny Website)
- Soltis, D; Soltis, P; Arakaki, M (2006). "Saxifragales". Tree of Life.
- WFO (2019). "Saxifragales Bercht. & J.Presl". World Flora Online.
- Hamamelidaceae Archived 2005-12-29 at the Wayback Machine in L. Watson and M.J. Dallwitz (1992 onwards). The families of flowering plants. Archived 2007-01-03 at the Wayback Machine
