= Dicoryphe =

Scientific classification
- Kingdom: Plantae
- Clade: Tracheophytes
- Clade: Angiosperms
- Clade: Eudicots
- Order: Saxifragales
- Family: Hamamelidaceae
- Subfamily: Hamamelidoideae
- Tribe: Dicorypheae
- Genus: Dicoryphe; Thouars

Synonyms
- Diania Noronha ex Tul.; Dicophe Roem.; Dicorypha R.Hedw.

Genus of plants

Dicoryphe is a genus of flowering plants belonging to the family Hamamelidaceae. It includes 13 species native to Madagascar and Mayotte.

== Species ==
13 species are accepted.

- Dicoryphe angustifolia Tul.
- Dicoryphe buddlejoides Baker
- Dicoryphe gracilis Tul.
- Dicoryphe guatteriifolia Baker
- Dicoryphe lanceolata Tul.
- Dicoryphe laurifolia Baker
- Dicoryphe laurina Baill.
- Dicoryphe macrophylla Baill.
- Dicoryphe noronhae Tul.
- Dicoryphe platyphylla Tul.
- Dicoryphe retusa Baker
- Dicoryphe stipulacea J.St.-Hil.
- Dicoryphe viticoides Baker
