= List of botanical gardens and arboretums in Delaware =

This list of botanical gardens and arboretums in Delaware is intended to include all significant botanical gardens and arboretums in the U.S. state of Delaware

Name	Image	Affiliation	City
Delaware Botanic Gardens			Dagsboro
Delaware Center for Horticulture			Wilmington
Hagley Museum and Library			Greenville
Mt. Cuba Center			Hockessin
Nemours Mansion and Gardens			Wilmington
University of Delaware Botanic Gardens		University of Delaware	Newark
Winterthur Museum, Garden and Library			Winterthur

== See also ==
- List of botanical gardens and arboretums in the United States
