= University of Delaware Botanic Gardens =

Botanical Gardens at University of Delaware, Delaware, United States

Coordinates: 39.666°N 75.7519°W

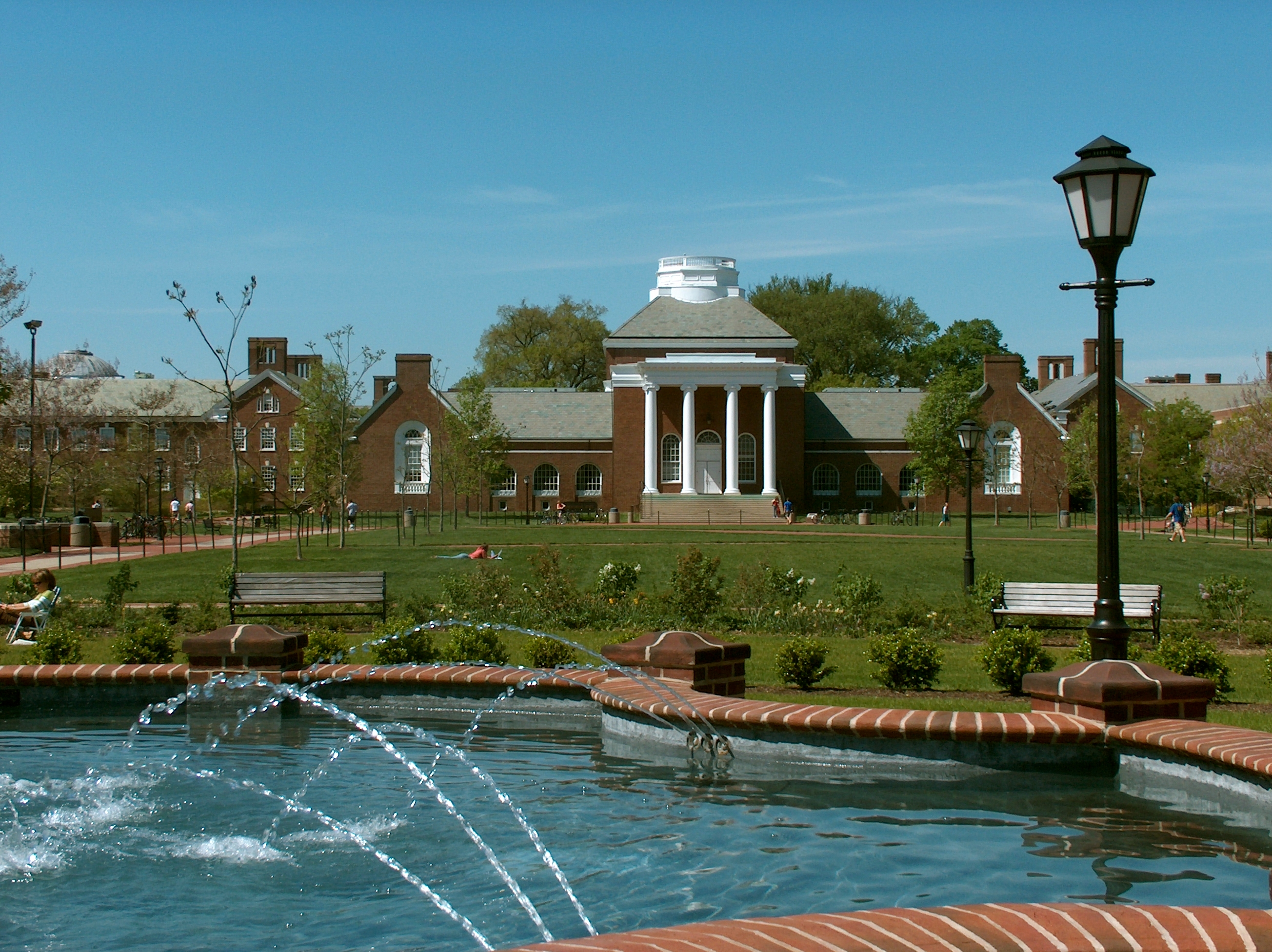

The University of Delaware Botanic Gardens are botanical gardens and an arboretum located on the campus of the University of Delaware, in Newark, Delaware, United States. The gardens are open to the public without charge.

The original garden in front of Townsend Hall was established with a donation from Emily Clark Diffenback in the mid-1960s, and has been named Clark Garden in her honor. It has since been designated a test arboretum by the American Holly Society. Other gardens include a Magnolia Society test garden south of Townsend Hall; native and non-native plants north of Worrilow Hall; a wildflower area in front of the Fischer Greenhouse Laboratory; a herbaceous perennial garden behind another greenhouse; and stretches of native trees and shrubs lining the driveway and grounds.

== List of tree and shrub species in collection ==
=== A ===
- Abelia x grandiflora
- Abeliophyllum distichum
- Abies firma
- Abies homolepis
- Abies koreana
- Abies pinsapo
- Acer buergerianum
- Acer campestre
- Acer ginnala
- Acer griseum
- Acer negundo
- Acer palmatum
- Acer pensylvanicum
- Acer platanoides
- Acer rubrum
- Acer saccharinum
- Acer saccharum
- Acer triflorum
- Aesculus hippocastanum
- Aesculus pavia
- Alnus glutinosa
- Aralia spinosa
- Aronia arbutifolia
- Asimina triloba

=== B ===
- Berberis julianae
- Berberis thunbergii
- Berberis verruculosa
- Betula lenta
- Betula maximowiczii
- Betula nigra
- Betula papyrifera
- Betula pendula

=== C ===
- Calycanthus floridus
- Camellia japonica
- Camellia sinensis
- Carpinus betulus
- Carpinus caroliniana
- Carya tomentosa
- Castanea mollissima
- Catalpa bignonioides
- Catalpa speciosa
- Cedrus atlantica
- Cedrus deodara
- Cedrus libani
- Celtis occidentalis
- Cephalotaxus harringtonii
- Cercidiphyllum japonicum
- Chamaecyparis lawsoniana
- Chamaecyparis thyoides
- Chimonanthus praecox
- Cladrastis kentukea
- Clethra acuminata
- Clethra alnifolia
- Cornus alternifolia
- Cornus mas
- Cornus sericea ("Red Osier Dogwood")
- Corylopsis glabrescens
- Corylopsis pauciflora
- Cotinus coggygria
- Cryptomeria japonica
- Cunninghamia lanceolata
- Cupressus glabra

=== D ===
- Daphne caucasica
- Daphne cneorum
- Daphne genkwa
- Daphne odora
- Daphniphyllum humile
- Daphniphyllum macropodum
- Diospyros virginiana

=== E ===
- Elaeagnus umbellata
- Euonymus alatus

=== F ===
- Fagus grandifolia
- Fagus sylvatica
- Forsythia viridissima ("Broxensis")
- Forsythia × intermedia
- Fothergilla gardenii
- Fraxinus americana
- Fraxinus pennsylvanica

=== G ===
- Ginkgo biloba

=== H ===
- Hamamelis virginiana ("Witch-hazel")
- Hamamelis × intermedia
- Hibiscus syriacus
- Hovenia dulcis
- Hydrangea macrophylla
- Hydrangea quercifolia
- Hypericum ("Hidcote")

=== I ===
- Ilex cassine
- Ilex cornuta
- Ilex latifolia
- Ilex vomitoria
- Ilex × attenuata
- Ilex × koehneana
- Illicium anisatum
- Illicium floridanum
- Illicium henryi
- Illicium parviflorum
- Itea chinensis

=== J ===
- Jasminum nudiflorum
- Juglans nigra
- Juniperus communis
- Juniperus deppeana
- Juniperus rigida
- Juniperus scopulorum

=== L ===
- Lagerstroemia indica
- Larix decidua
- Lindera benzoin
- Liquidambar styraciflua
- Lonicera pileata
- Lonicera sempervirens
- Loropetalum chinense

=== M ===
- Magnolia 'Elizabeth'
- Magnolia 'Raspberry Ice'
- Magnolia grandiflora
- Magnolia sieboldii
- Magnolia soulangeana
- Magnolia stellata
- Mahonia japonica
- Metasequoia glyptostroboides
- Myrica pensylvanica

=== N ===
- Nyssa sylvatica

=== O ===
- Osmanthus fragrans
- Osmanthus heterophyllus ("Argentio-Marginata")
- Osmanthus × fortunei
- Ostrya virginiana
- Oxydendrum arboreum

=== P ===
- Phellodendron amurense
- Photinia × fraseri
- Picea abies
- Picea glauca
- Picea pungens
- Pinus aristata
- Pinus ayacahuite
- Pinus bungeana
- Pinus cembra
- Pinus densiflora
- Pinus flexilis
- Pinus heldreichii
- Pinus koraiensis
- Pinus mugo
- Pinus nigra
- Pinus palustris
- Pinus pumila
- Pinus resinosa
- Pinus strobiformis
- Pinus strobus
- Pinus sylvestris
- Pinus taeda
- Pinus thunbergii
- Pinus virginiana
- Pinus wallichiana
- Platanus × hispanica
- Platycladus orientalis
- Prunus laurocerasus
- Pseudolarix amabilis
- Pseudotsuga menziesii
- Pyracantha coccinea

=== Q ===
- Quercus acutissima
- Quercus alba
- Quercus aliena
- Quercus imbricaria
- Quercus macrocarpa
- Quercus palustris
- Quercus phellos
- Quercus robur
- Quercus rubra

=== R ===
- Rhapidophyllum hystrix
- Rhododendron "PJM"
- Rhododendron canescens
- Rhododendron carolinianum
- Rhododendron catawbiense
- Rhododendron makinoi
- Rhododendron maximum
- Rhododendron minus
- Rhododendron prunifolium
- Rhododendron schlippenbachii
- Rhododendron yakusimanum
- Rhus aromatica
- Rhus chinensis
- Rhus typhina

=== S ===
- Salix alba ("Tristis")
- Salix purpurea
- Sassafras albidum
- Sciadopitys verticillata
- Skimmia japonica
- Styrax japonicus
- Styrax obassia
- Symphoricarpos orbiculatus ("Coralberry")

=== T ===
- Taxodium ascendens
- Taxodium distichum
- Taxus baccata
- Taxus × media
- Tetradium daniellii
- Torreya nucifera
- Trochodendron aralioides
- Tsuga canadensis
- Tsuga caroliniana
- Tsuga diversifolia
- Tsuga sieboldii

=== V ===
- Viburnum carlesii
- Viburnum dilatatum
- Viburnum lentago
- Viburnum macrocephalum
- Viburnum plicatum
- Viburnum rhytidophyllum
- Viburnum setigerum
- Viburnum utile
- Viburnum × burkwoodii
- Viburnum × pragense
- Viburnum × rhytidophlloides

=== W ===
- Weigela Florida

=== Z ===
- Zelkova serrata
- Zenobia pulverulenta

== See also ==
- List of botanical gardens in the United States
