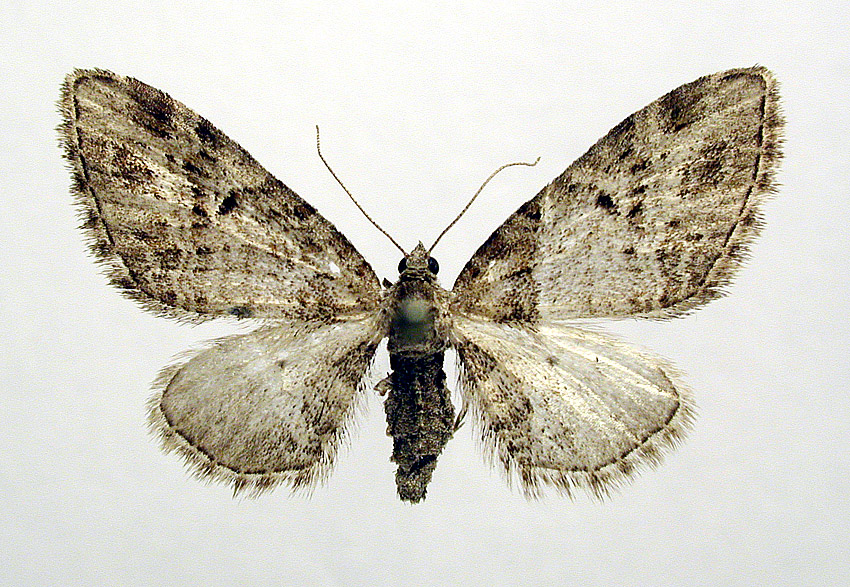

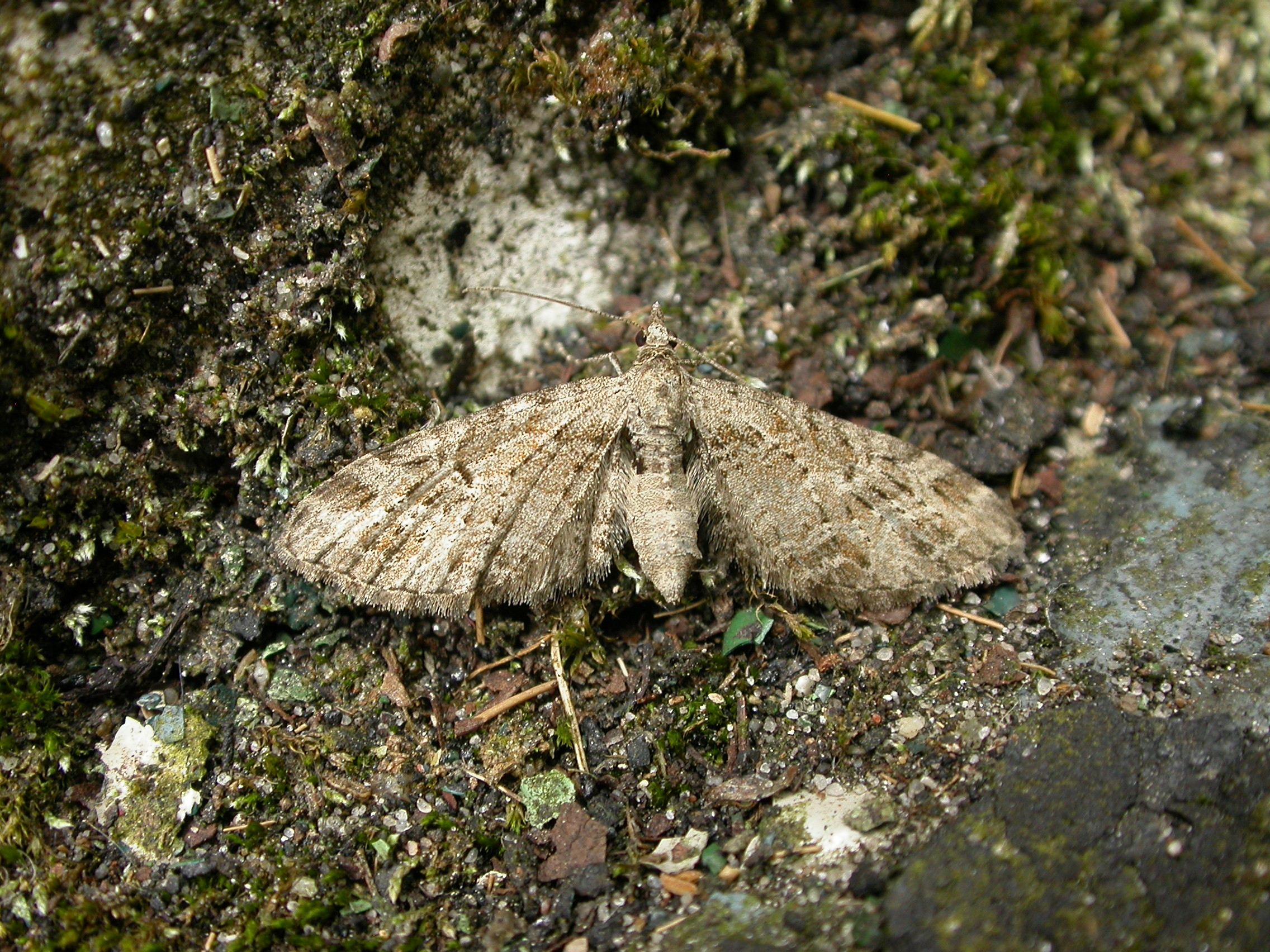

Scientific classification
- Kingdom: Animalia
- Phylum: Arthropoda
- Class: Insecta
- Order: Lepidoptera
- Family: Geometridae
- Genus: Eupithecia
- Species: E. exiguata

Binomial name
- Eupithecia exiguata (Hübner, 1813)

Synonyms
- Geometra exiguata Hubner, 1813; Eupithecia lanceolaria Wood, 1854; Eupithecia ochreata Stephens, 1831; Phalaena trimaculata Haworth, 1809

= Mottled pug =

Species of moth

The mottled pug (Eupithecia exiguata) is a moth of the family Geometridae. The species was first described by Jacob Hübner in 1813. It is found across the Palearctic region apart from around the Mediterranean Sea. It is common in the British Isles apart from Scotland where it is rather local.

The wingspan is 20–22 mm and the long and pointed forewings are brown or yellowish grey marked with pale radial lines and a large, somewhat oval black discal spot. The most characteristic markings are the strong black dashes on the radial and median veins where they cross the postmedian band The hindwings are cream or grey also with a discal spot. The larva is green with lozenge-shaped red dorsal spots.

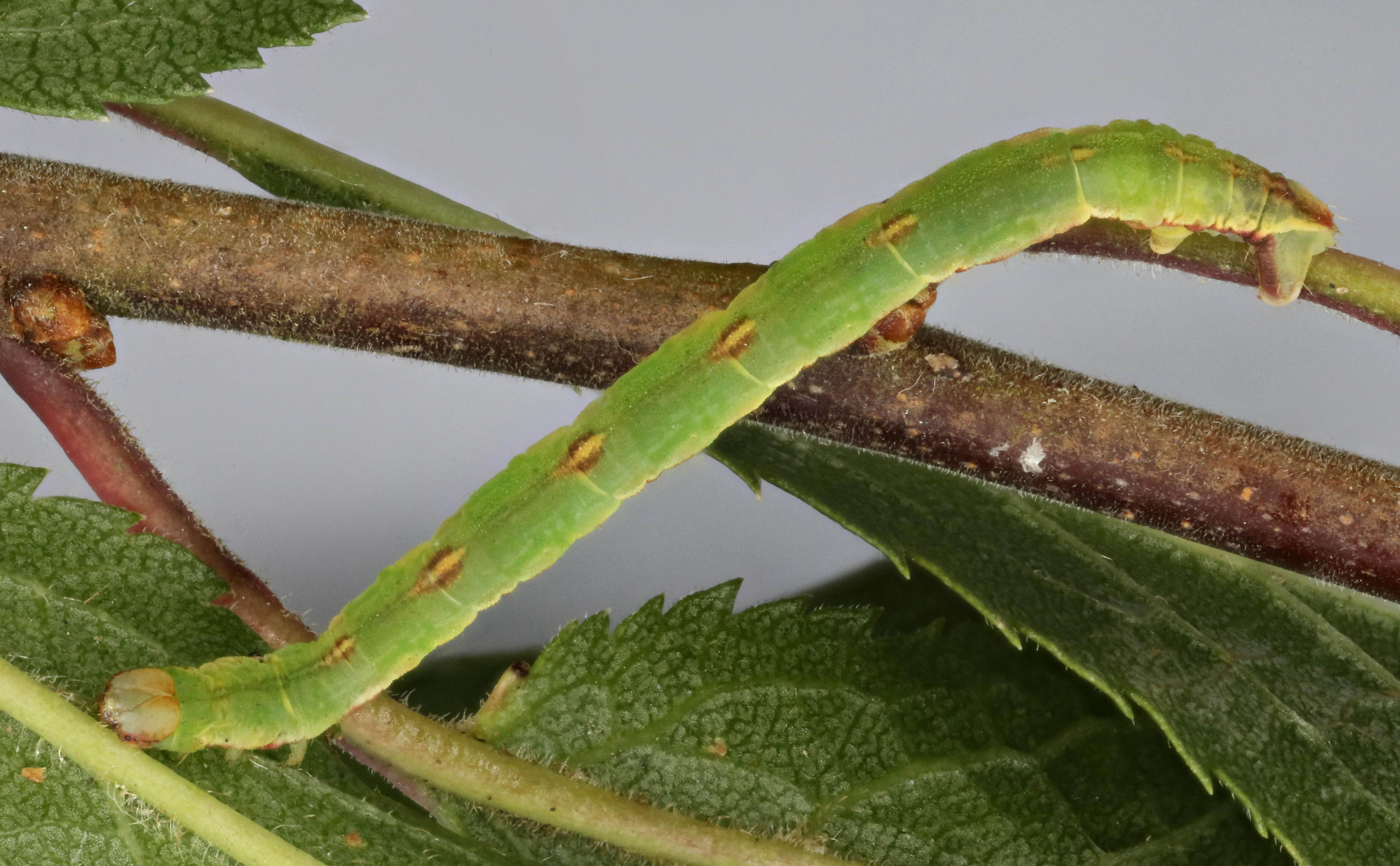
Larva.Mariandyrys, North Wales.

The species flies at night in May and June and is attracted to light, sometimes in large numbers.

The larva feeds on the foliage of various trees and shrubs (see list below). The species overwinters as a pupa.

== Subspecies ==
- Eupithecia exiguata exiguata
- Eupithecia exiguata muricolor Prout, 1938

== Recorded food plants ==
- Acer – sycamore
- Berberis
- Crataegus – hawthorn
- Lonicera – honeysuckle
- Malus – apple
- Prunus
- Ribes – redcurrant
- Sorbus – rowan
