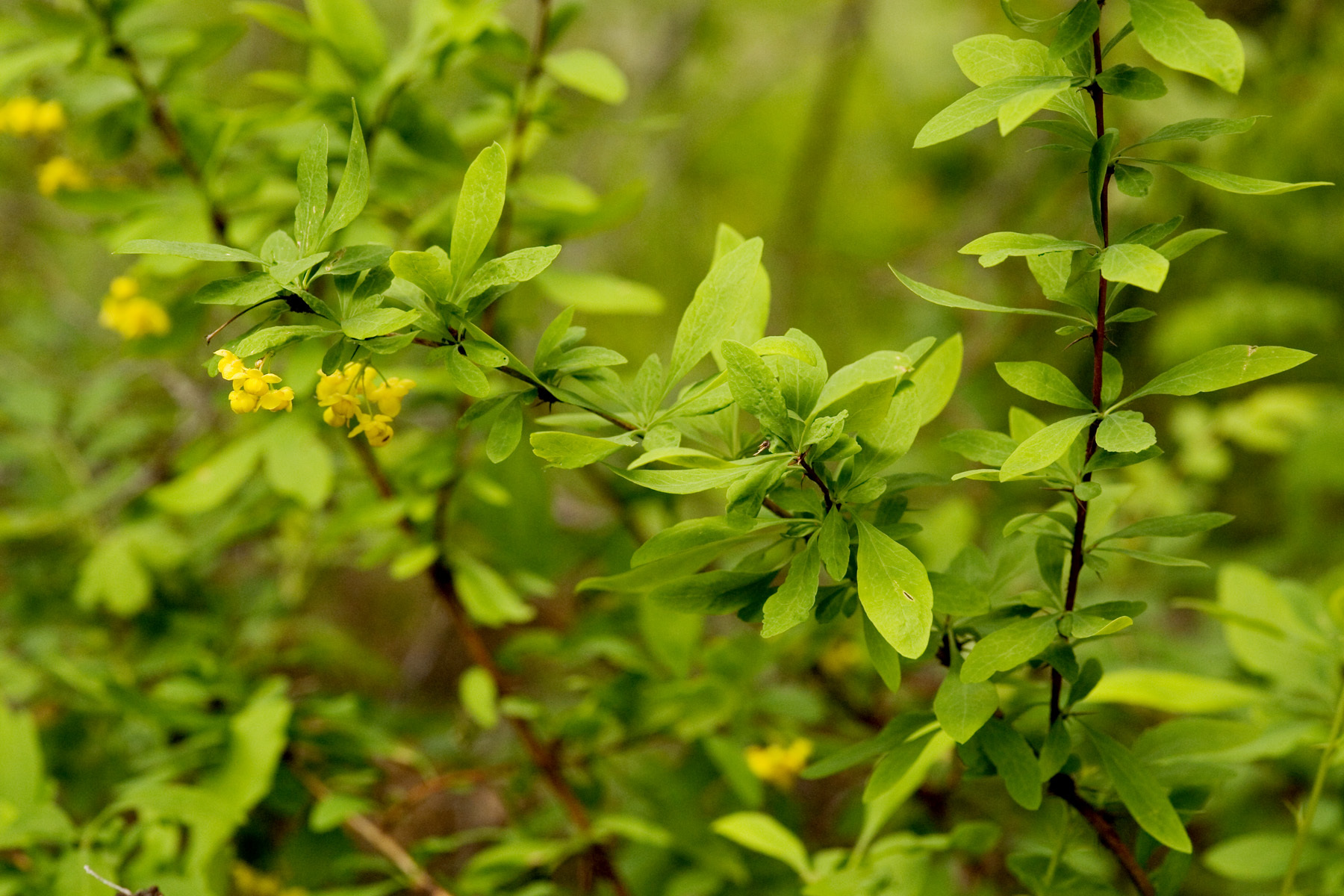

Conservation status
- Secure (NatureServe)

Scientific classification
- Kingdom: Plantae
- Clade: Tracheophytes
- Clade: Angiosperms
- Clade: Eudicots
- Order: Ranunculales
- Family: Berberidaceae
- Genus: Berberis
- Species: B. fendleri

Binomial name
- Berberis fendleri A.Gray

= Berberis fendleri =

Species of shrub

Berberis fendleri, commonly known as Colorado barberry, is a shrub native to canyons and mountain slopes in the western United States (Colorado, New Mexico, and Utah).

== Description ==
Berberis fendleri is up to 2 m (7 feet) tall, and has simple deciduous leaves up to 4.6 cm (1.8 inches) long. Flowers are borne in racemes of up to 15 flowers, each producing a red, juicy, oblong fruit up to 8 mm long.
