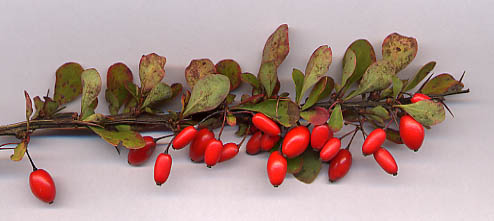
- Fruit

Scientific classification
- Kingdom: Plantae
- Clade: Embryophytes
- Clade: Tracheophytes
- Clade: Spermatophytes
- Clade: Angiosperms
- Clade: Eudicots
- Order: Ranunculales
- Family: Berberidaceae
- Genus: Berberis
- Species: B. thunbergii

Binomial name
- Berberis thunbergii DC.

= Berberis thunbergii =

Species of plant

Berberis thunbergii, the Japanese barberry, Thunberg's barberry, or red barberry, is a species of flowering plant in the barberry family Berberidaceae, native to Japan and eastern Asia, though widely naturalized in China and North America, where it has become a problematic invasive in many places, leading to declines in species diversity, increased tick habitat, and soil changes. Growing to 1 m (3 ft 3 in) tall by 2.5 m (8 ft 2 in) broad, it is a small deciduous shrub with green leaves turning red in the autumn, brilliant red fruits in autumn and pale yellow flowers in spring.

== Description ==
B. thunbergii has deeply grooved, brown, spiny branches with a single (occasionally tridentine) spine (actually a highly modified leaf) at each shoot node. The leaves are green to blue-green (reddish or purple in some horticultural variants), very small, spatula to oval shaped, 12–24 mm (1/2–15/16 in) long and 3–15 mm (1/8–9/16 in) broad; they are produced in clusters of 2–6 on a dwarf shoot in the axil of each spine. The flowers are pale yellow, 5–8 mm (3/16–5/16 in) diameter, produced in drooping 1–1.5 cm (3/8–5/8 in) long umbrella-shaped clusters of 2–5; flowering is from mid spring to early summer. The edible fruit is a glossy bright red to orange-red, ovoid berry 7–10 mm (9/32–13/32 in) long and 4–7 mm (5/32–9/32 in) broad, containing a single seed. They mature during late summer and fall and persist through the winter.

== Identification ==
This species is sometimes confused with Berberis canadensis (American barberry), Berberis vulgaris (common or European barberry), and other deciduous Berberis species; it is most readily distinguished by the flowers being produced in umbels, not racemes.

== Cultivation ==
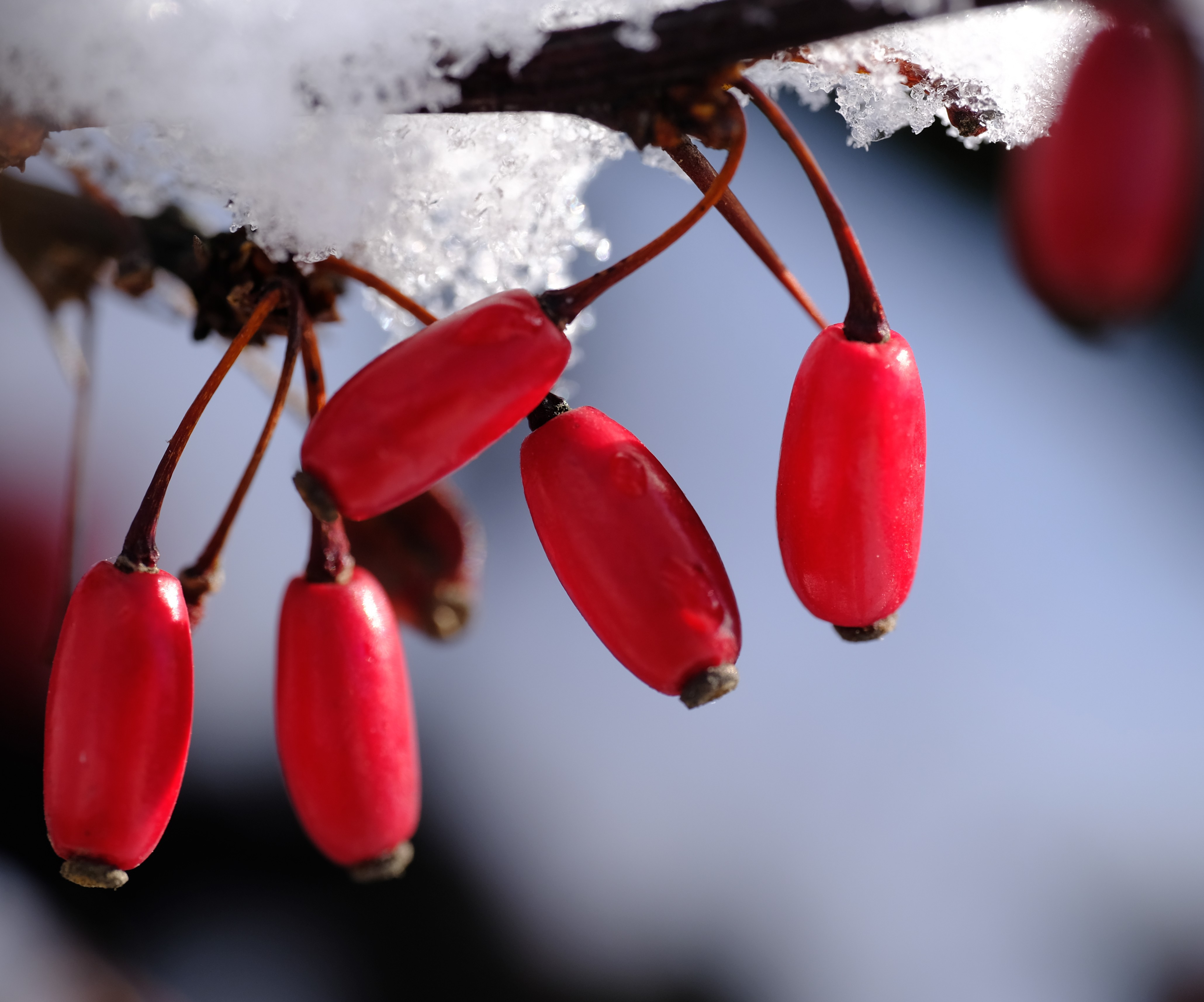
Berries on an ornamental plant in winter

Berberis thunbergii is widely grown as an ornamental plant, both in Japan and elsewhere in the temperate Northern Hemisphere. Numerous cultivars have been selected, including plants selected for yellow, dark red to violet, or variegated foliage, erect growth (for hedge use), and dwarf size. In Brazil, the plant is popularly known as Japanese barberis, and is widely cultivated in hedges and flower beds.

In cultivation in the UK, the following have gained the Royal Horticultural Society's Award of Garden Merit:

- B. thunbergii 'Fireball'
- B. thunbergii 'Maria'
- B. thunbergii f. atropurpurea 'Admiration'
- B. thunbergii f. atropurpurea 'Atropurpurea Nana'
- B. thunbergii f. atropurpurea 'Concorde'
- B. thunbergii f. atropurpurea 'Dart's Red Lady'
- B. thunbergii f. atropurpurea 'Golden Ring'
- B. thunbergii f. atropurpurea 'Harlequin'
- B. thunbergii f. atropurpurea 'Rose Glow'

== Invasive species ==
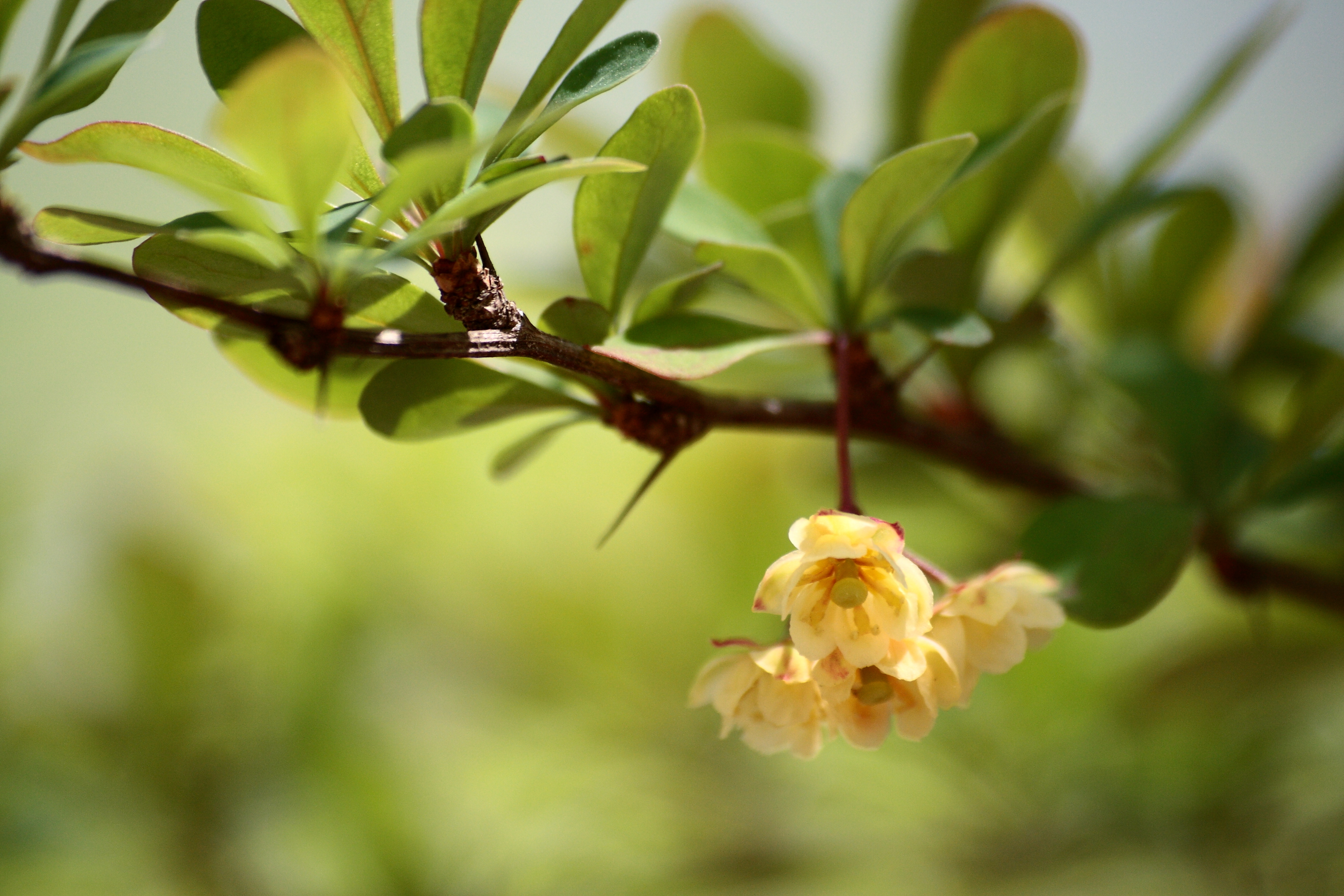
Flowers in an umbel on naturalized Berberis thunbergii in the eastern United States

Japanese barberry can be found in most northeastern and Great Lakes states of the United States and in the eastern Canadian provinces. A current map of its distribution can be found at the Early Detection and Distribution Mapping System (EDDmapS). In recent years, Berberis thunbergii has been recognized as an invasive species in many parts of the eastern United States and Canada. The Plant Conservation Alliance's Alien Plant Working Group lists it among its "Least Wanted". Japanese barberry is prohibited from being a seed contaminant in Michigan and banned from sale in Massachusetts and West Virginia. This species is ranked "Very High" on the New York State Threat Assessment scale.

This Berberis is avoided by deer, and has been replacing native species. Furthermore, the plant can raise the pH of the soil and affect soil nitrogen levels. Unlike B. canadensis and B. vulgaris, B. thunbergii does not act as a host for Puccinia graminis (black rust), a rust pathogen of wheat. B. thunbergii, however, naturally hybridizes with B. vulgaris, and the offspring can be susceptible to P. graminis.

Japanese barberry provides an exceptionally favorable environment for ticks due to the high humidity present in barberry's dense foliage. It is hypothesized that spread of barberry is correlated with the spread of Lyme disease. Tick numbers are higher in areas with thick barberry understories, as opposed to areas with controlled barberry or no barberry. In one study, 280 ± 51 adult black-legged ticks, Ixodes scapularis, were found per hectare (113 ± 21/acre) in a barberry infected area, while only 30 ± 10 adult black-legged ticks were found per hectare (12.1 ± 4.0/acre) in otherwise similar area with no barberry present.

A 2023 community-level study in a temperate forest in Connecticut observed that B. thunbergii had a lower arthropods abundance and a lower protein quality of arthropod in comparison to other native woody shrub species. Invasive species like B. thunbergii dominating over and competing against native plant species in forest ecosystems has an adverse effect on the food web in these communities by rendering fewer nutrients available to consumers.

Detailed information on how to control Japanese barberry is available in a Michigan Department of Natural Resources document.

== Gallery ==
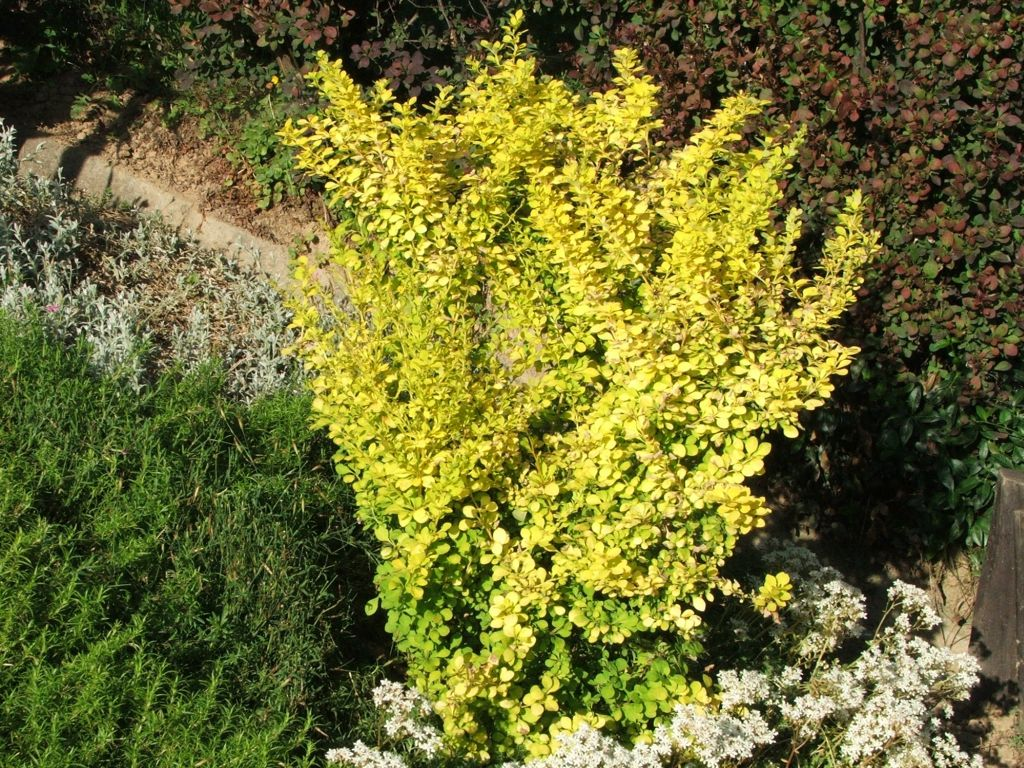
Cultivar 'Aurea'

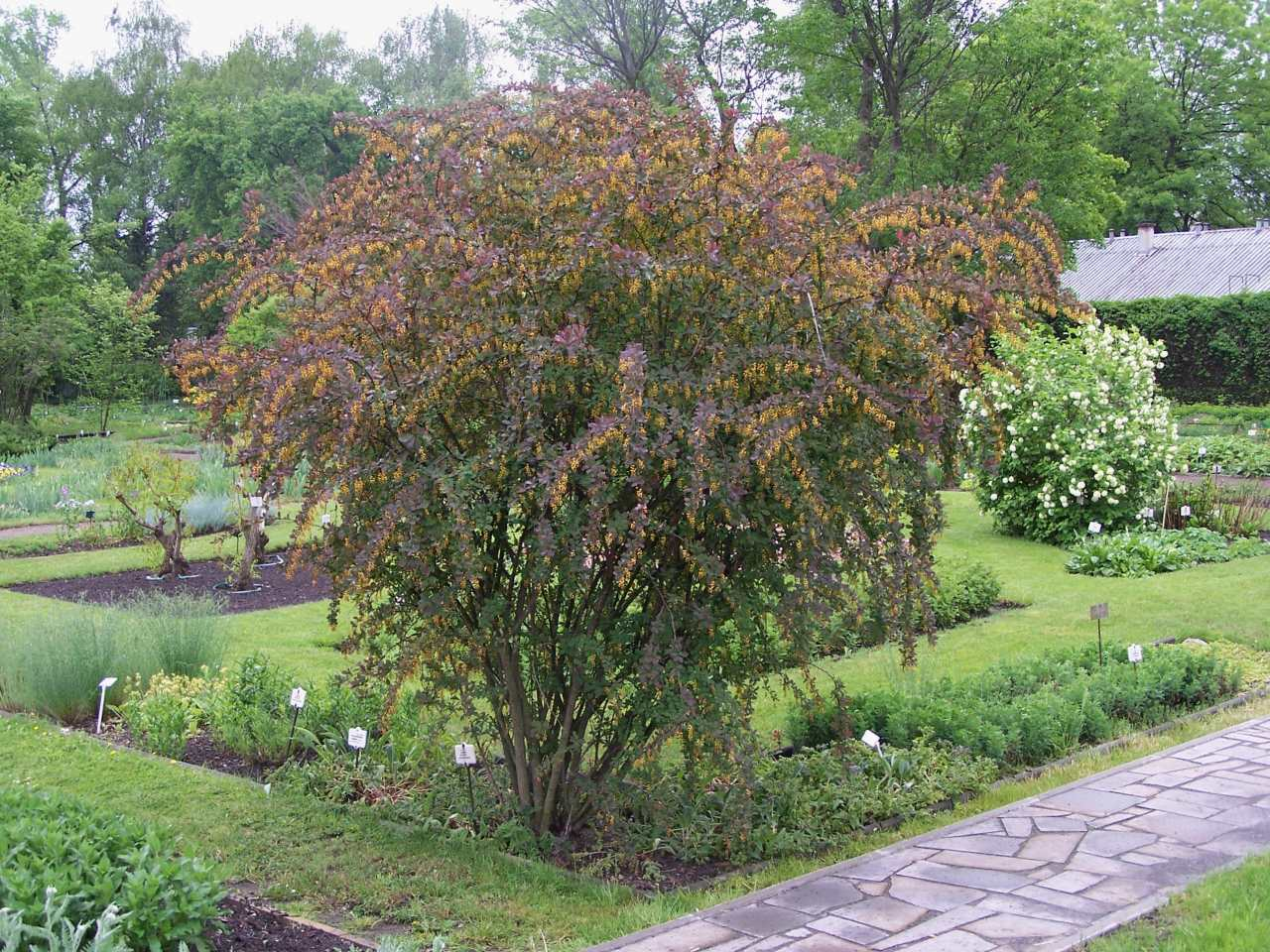
Cultivar 'Atropurpurea'

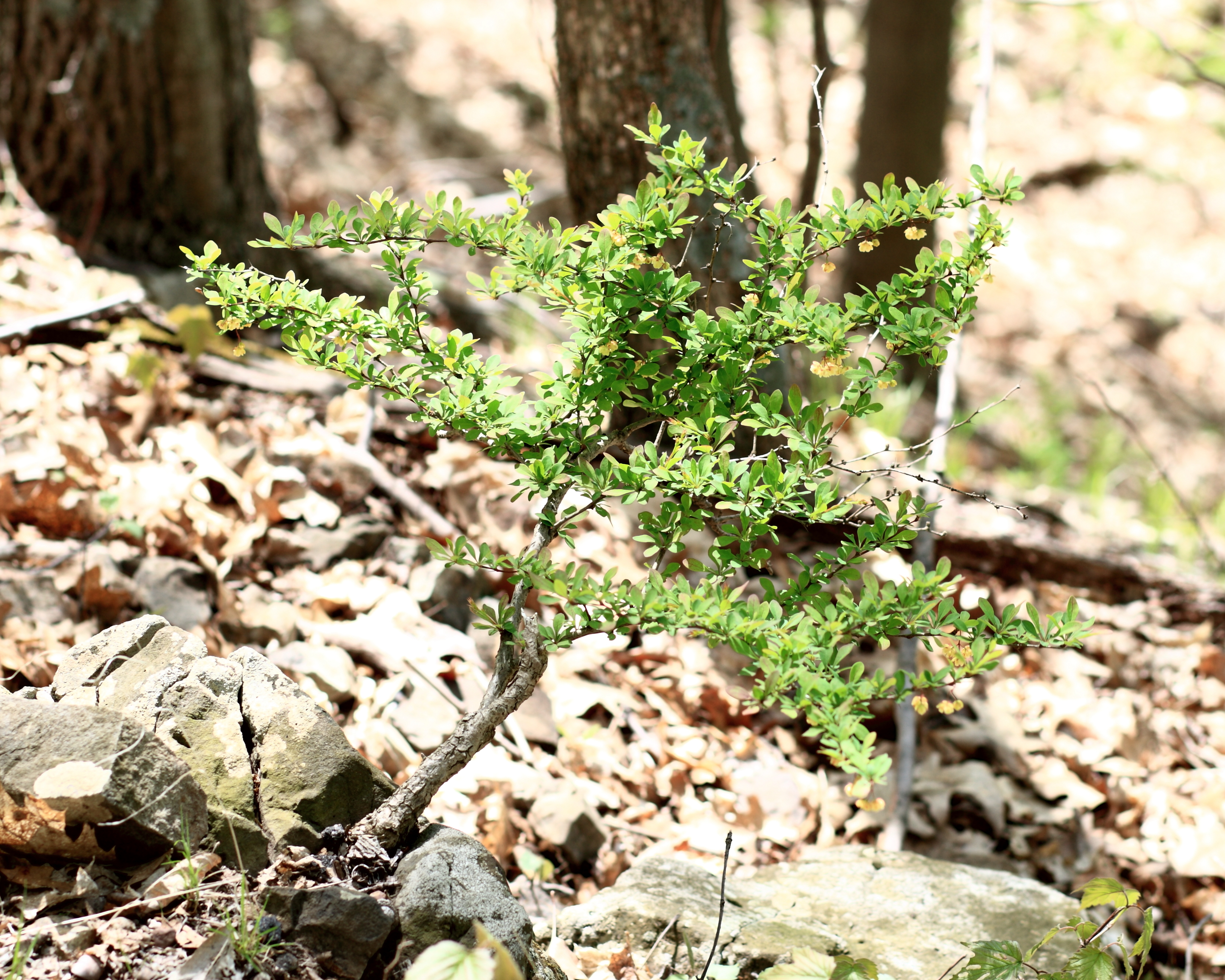
Naturalized Berberis thunbergii in Penwood State Park in Connecticut

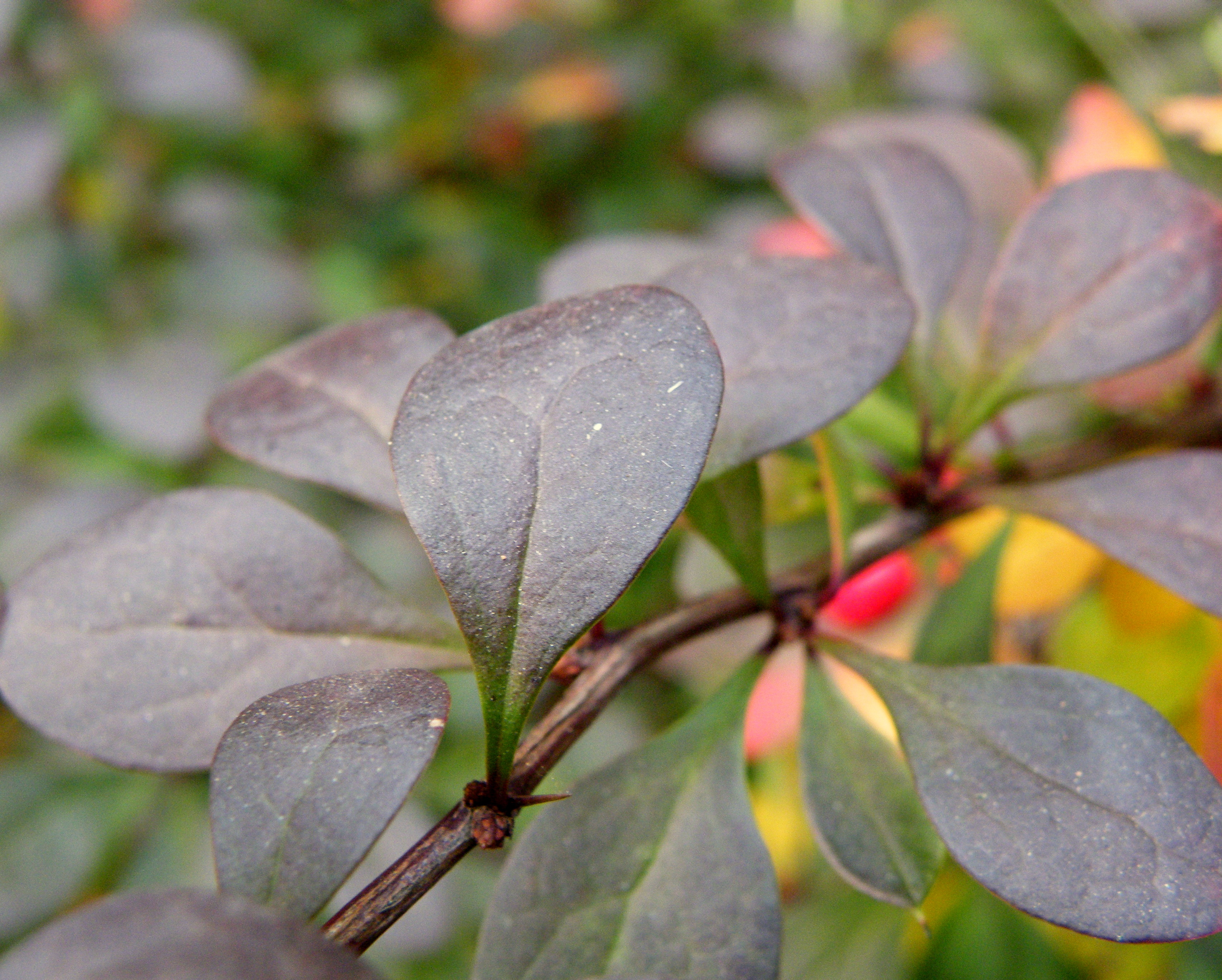
Leaves

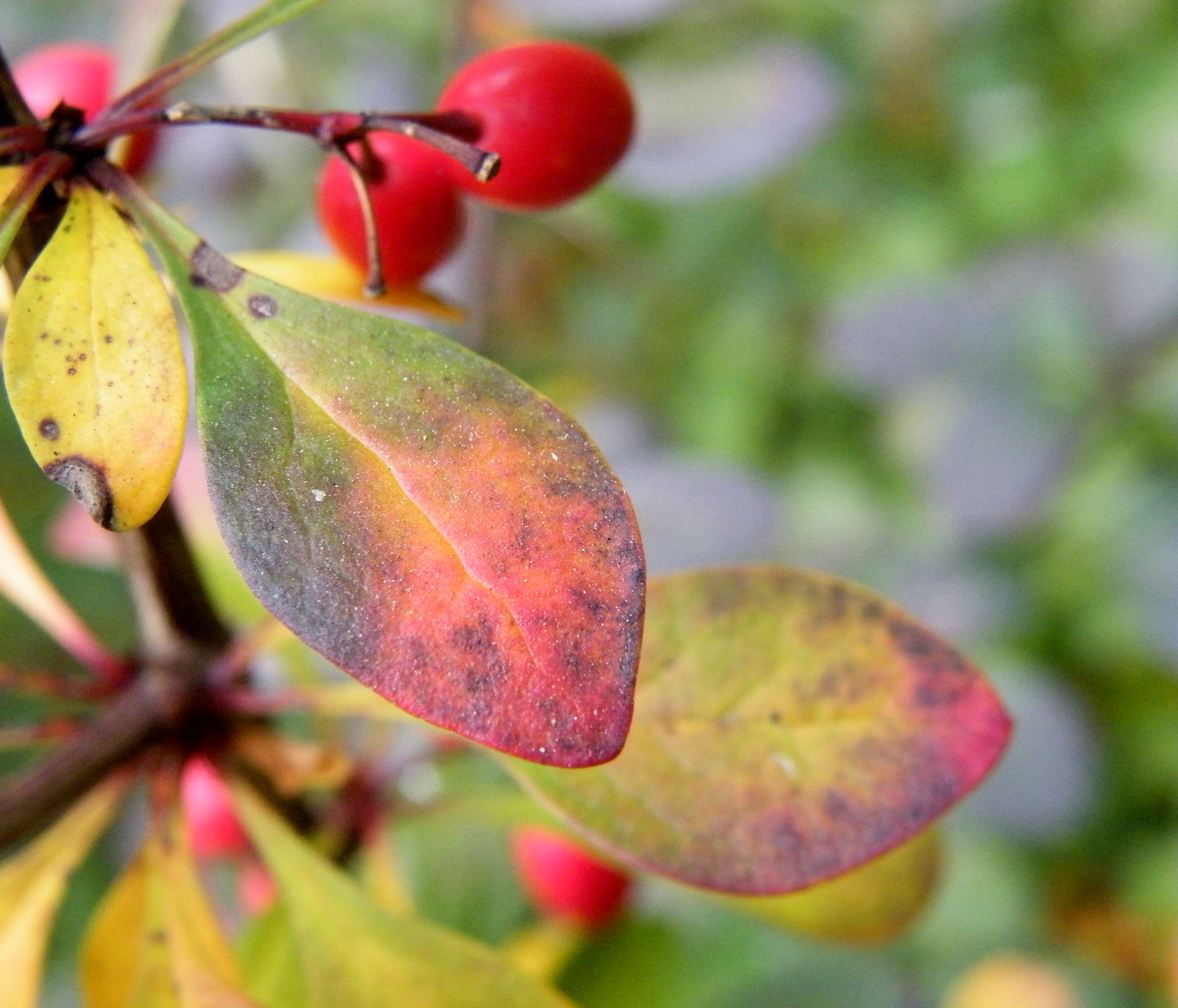
Leaf
