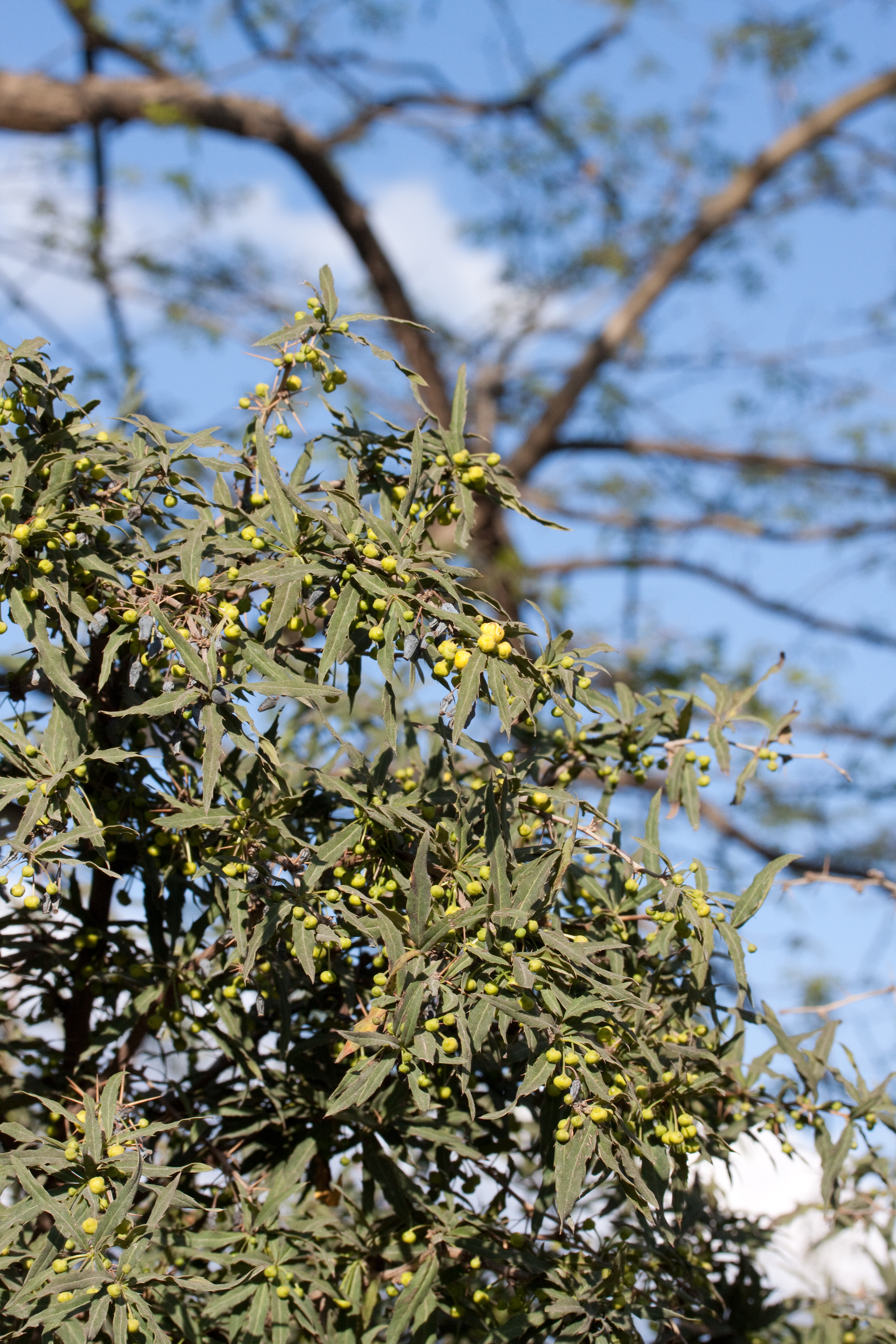

Scientific classification
- Kingdom: Plantae
- Clade: Tracheophytes
- Clade: Angiosperms
- Clade: Eudicots
- Order: Ranunculales
- Family: Berberidaceae
- Genus: Berberis
- Species: B. gagnepainii

Binomial name
- Berberis gagnepainii C.K.Schneid.

= Berberis gagnepainii =

Gagnepain's barberry

Species of plant

Berberis gagnepainii, or Gagnepain's barberry, is a species of flowering plant in the family Berberidaceae, first described in 1908. It is endemic to China, known from Guizhou, Hubei, Sichuan, and Yunnan Provinces.

Berberis gagnepainii is a shrub up to 2 m tall. The leaves are evergreen, simple, lanceolate to elliptical, toothed, the teeth tipped with short spines. The leaves and flowers are borne on short shoots in the axils of 3-parted spines. The inflorescence is a fascicle of 2-15 yellow flowers. The berries are glaucous (waxy), dark blue-black and oblong. Its habitats include montane thickets as well as forest margins and understories.

Its name is dedicated to François Gagnepain.

== Gallery ==
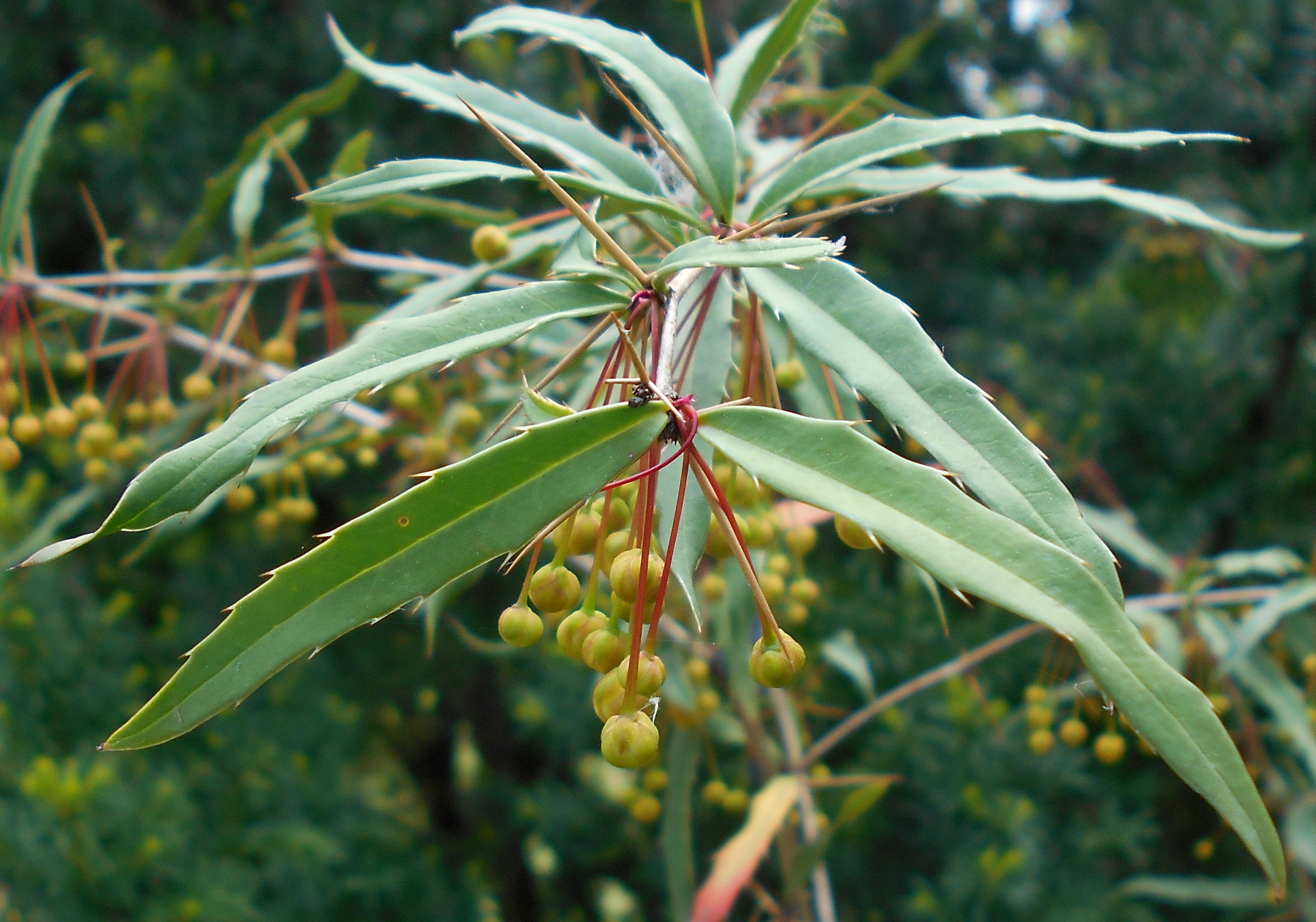
Leaves (Berberis gagnepainii)

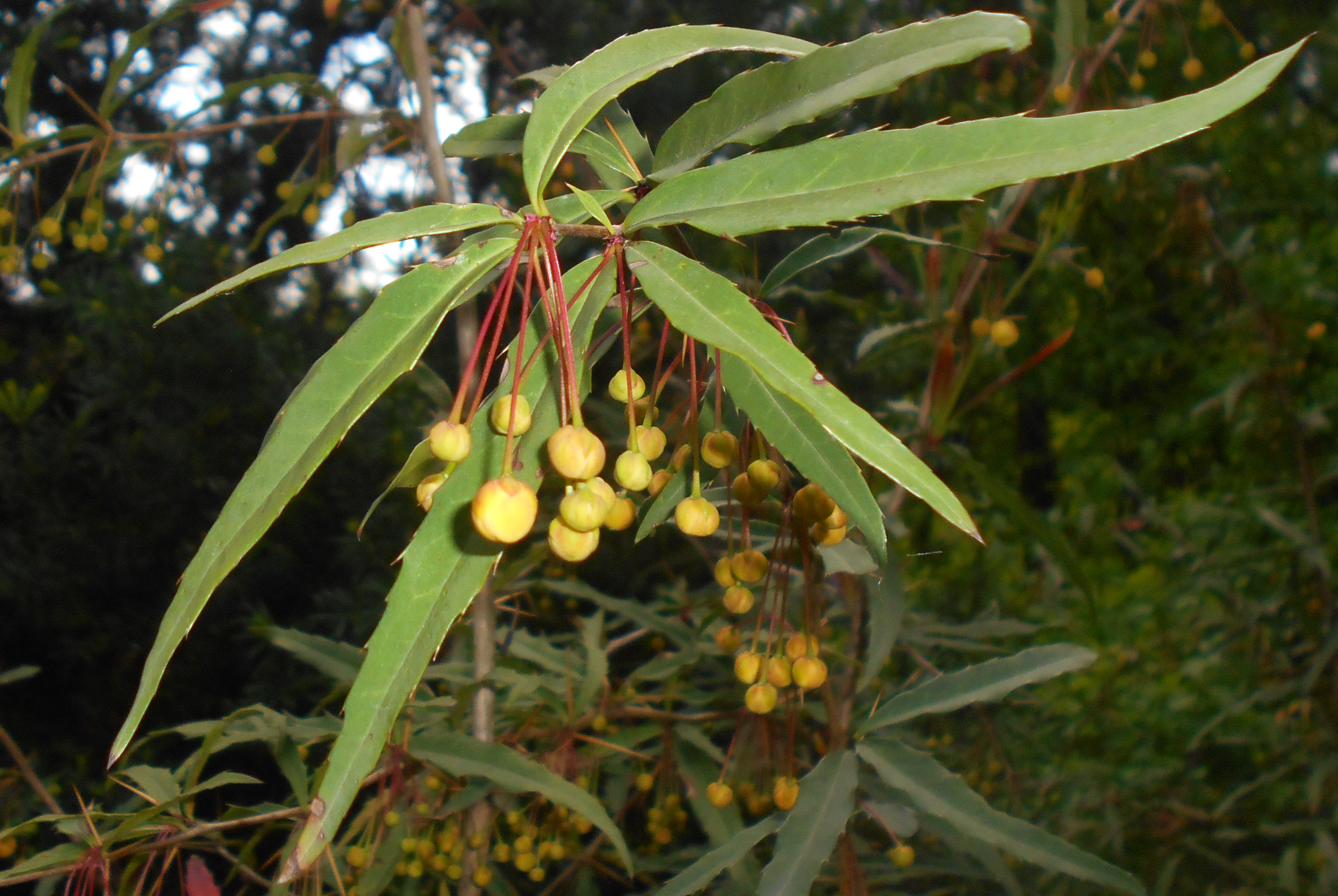
Leaf (Berberis gagnepainii)

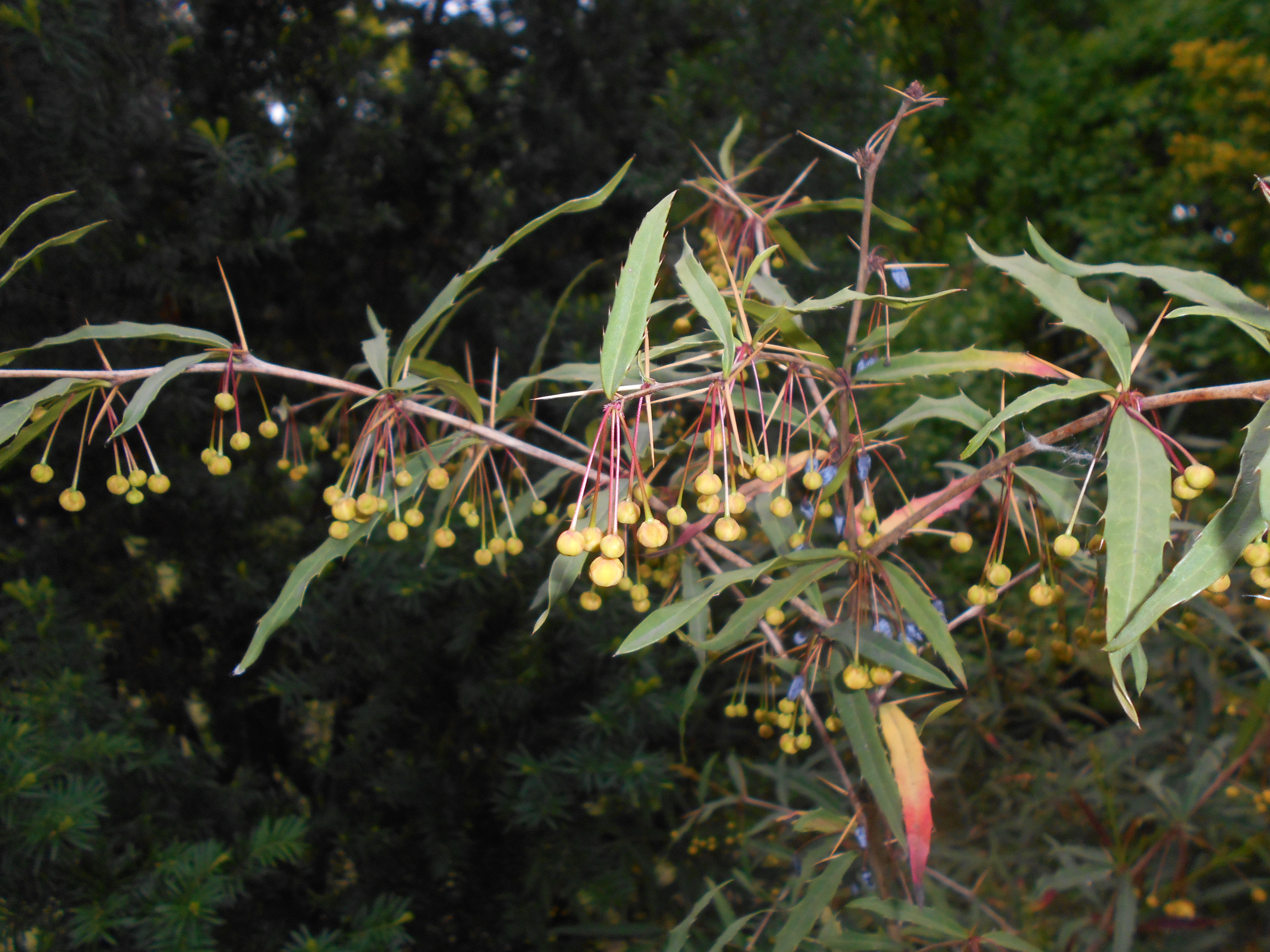
Berberis gagnepainii
