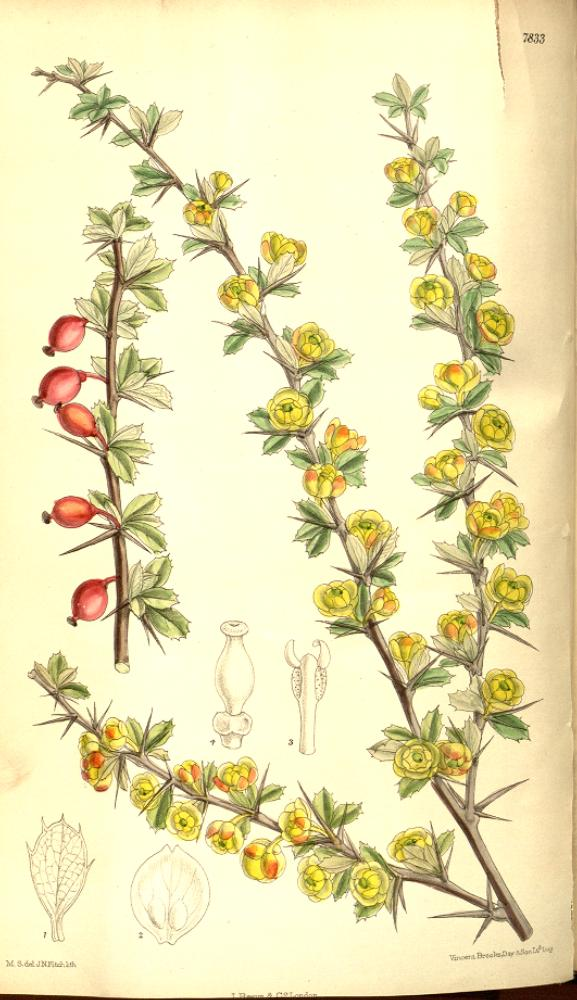
- 1902 illustration

Scientific classification
- Kingdom: Plantae
- Clade: Tracheophytes
- Clade: Angiosperms
- Clade: Eudicots
- Order: Ranunculales
- Family: Berberidaceae
- Genus: Berberis
- Species: B. dictyophylla

Binomial name
- Berberis dictyophylla Franch.

Synonyms
- Berberis approximata var. campylogyna Ahrendt; Berberis dictyophylla var. campylogyna (Ahrendt) Ahrendt; Berberis dictyophylla var. epruinosa C.K.Schneid.

= Berberis dictyophylla =

Species of plant

Berberis dictyophylla, the netleaf barberry, is a deciduous shrub in the genus Berberis which is native to Western China (Qinghai, Sichuan, Tibet, Yunnan).

Berberis dictyophylla grows to 150 cm in height. The young shoots are covered in a white bloom and bear branching spines. The obovate leaves turn red or yellow in Autumn. The plant bears solitary pale yellow flowers. Berries egg-shaped, reddish, often with a white bloom, up to 15 mm long. It grows in many habitats including forests, mountain slopes, thickets, and roadsides.
