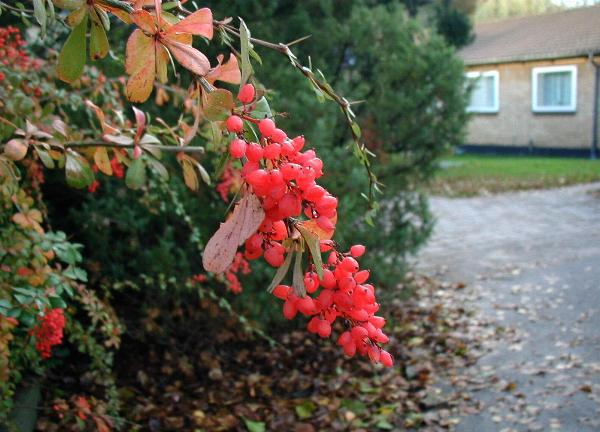

Scientific classification
- Kingdom: Plantae
- Clade: Tracheophytes
- Clade: Angiosperms
- Clade: Eudicots
- Order: Ranunculales
- Family: Berberidaceae
- Genus: Berberis
- Species: B. aggregata

Binomial name
- Berberis aggregata C.K. Schneid.

Synonyms
- Berberis aggregata var. integrifolia Ahrendt

= Berberis aggregata =

Clustered barberry

Species of shrub

Berberis aggregata, the clustered barberry, is a shrub native to western China (Gansu, Hubei, Qinghai, Shanxi, Sichuan). It grows at elevations of 1000–3500 m.

Berberis aggregata is a shrub up to 3 m tall with spines along the younger branches. Leaves are ovate, up to 25 mm long, dark green on the upper surface, much lighter underneath. Flowers are borne tightly clustered in a panicle of as many as 25 flowers. Berries are red, spherical, about 7 mm in diameter.
