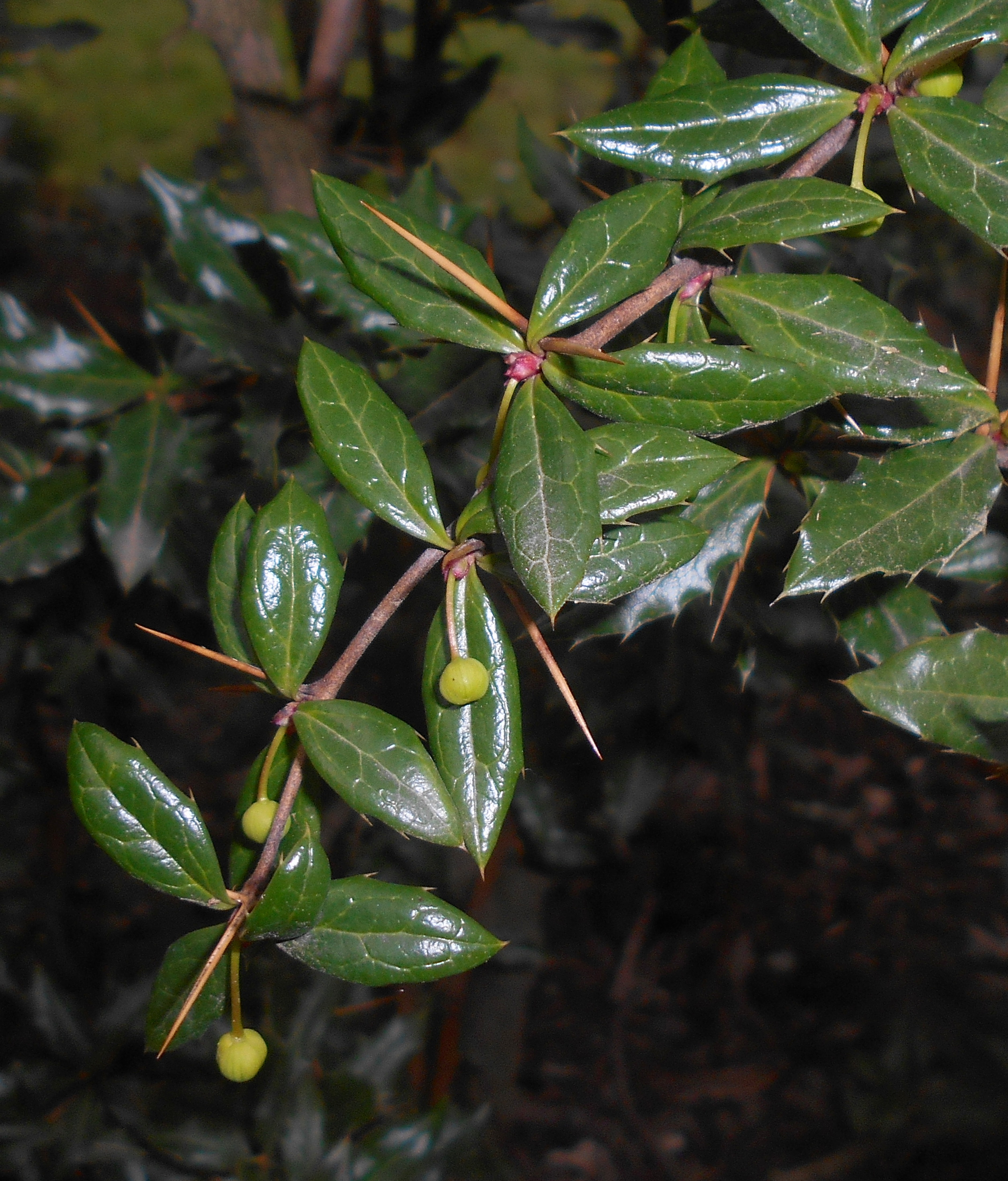

Conservation status
- Vulnerable (IUCN 3.1)

Scientific classification
- Kingdom: Plantae
- Clade: Tracheophytes
- Clade: Angiosperms
- Clade: Eudicots
- Order: Ranunculales
- Family: Berberidaceae
- Genus: Berberis
- Species: B. candidula

Binomial name
- Berberis candidula Schneid.

Synonyms
- Berberis hookeri Lemaire var. candidula C. K. Schneider

= Berberis candidula =

Species of plant

Berberis candidula is a species of plant in the family Berberidaceae. It is endemic to China, native to the provinces of Hubei and Sichuan. It is commonly known as paleleaf barberry.

Berberis candidula is an evergreen shrub up to 1m tall, with spines along the younger shoots. Leaves are simple, shiny, up to 20 mm long. Flowers are solitary, yellowish-red. Berries are ellipsoid, up to 10 mm long. It grows in thickets and montane roadsides.
