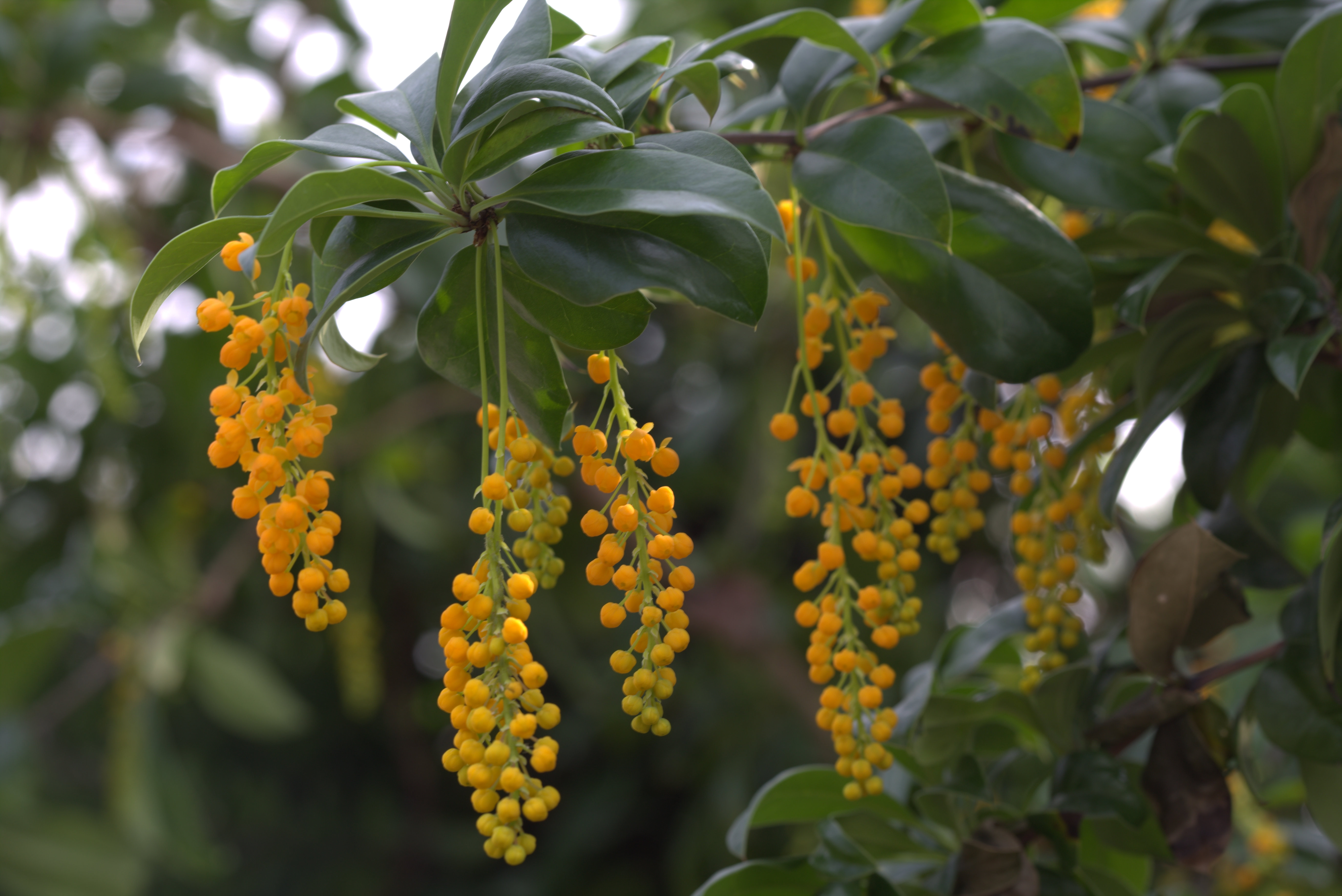
- In cultivation at Gothenburg Botanical Garden

Scientific classification
- Kingdom: Plantae
- Clade: Tracheophytes
- Clade: Angiosperms
- Clade: Eudicots
- Order: Ranunculales
- Family: Berberidaceae
- Genus: Berberis
- Species: B. valdiviana

Binomial name
- Berberis valdiviana Phil.

Synonyms
- B. valdiviana var. gracilifolia

= Berberis valdiviana =

Species of shrub

Berberis valdiviana is a species of flowering plant in the barberry family Berberidaceae. It is an evergreen shrub endemic to Chile, where it is locally known as clen or espina en cruz. It is distributed between the Santiago Metropolitan and Los Ríos regions. The Latin specific name valdiviana refers to the Valdivia Province of Chile. It has simple, dark green, pointed leaves, glossy on the upper surfaces, up to 8.5 cm (3.3 in) long. The flowers, which appear in May, are grouped in hanging racemes. Individual flowers are orange, 5–8 mm (0.2–0.3 in) across, and are followed by purplish fruits. It is grown as an ornamental plant, but is not suitable for colder regions.

In cultivation in the UK, where it eventually reaches a size of 4 metres (13 ft) tall and broad, this plant has gained the Royal Horticultural Society's Award of Garden Merit. It is hardy in the UK down to −15 °C (5 °F).
