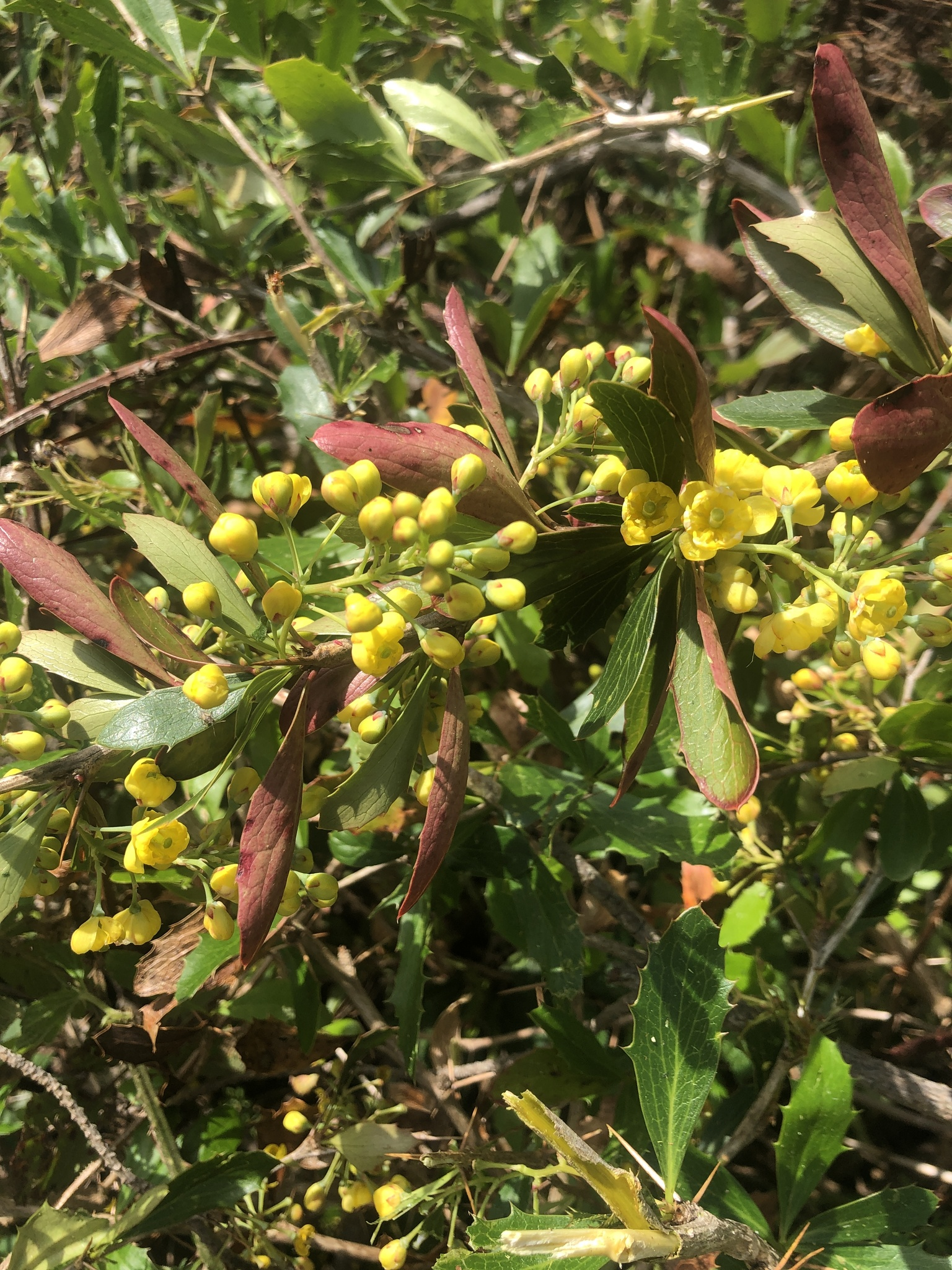
- B. glaucocarpa in Tasman District

Scientific classification
- Kingdom: Plantae
- Clade: Tracheophytes
- Clade: Angiosperms
- Clade: Eudicots
- Order: Ranunculales
- Family: Berberidaceae
- Genus: Berberis
- Species: B. glaucocarpa

Binomial name
- Berberis glaucocarpa Stapf

= Berberis glaucocarpa =

Species of flowering plant

Berberis glaucocarpa, sometimes called common barberry or simply barberry, is a species of flowering plant, a barberry, native to the western Himalaya in central Asia, to west central Nepal. It is considered invasive in New Zealand, where it is found in the North and South Island. It has also been introduced to Great Britain. The species is listed as banned in South Africa.

== Description ==
This species is glabrous, evergreen, woody, and has thorns. It can grow to up to 7m in height. The leaves have a short petiole. The flowers are yellow and foetid. The berries are reddish-black or purple with white powder on them, with dark red juice. It flowers from October to November in New Zealand, and fruits until February. In Pakistan, it fruits from September through October.

In New Zealand, this species can be distinguished from Darwin's barberry, which has dark purple berries, and European barberry, which has red. The tripartite spines that grow up to 2.5cm long, and the large spiny leaves and the very large possible height are also useful characteristics.

== Range and habitat ==
This barberry can be found in disturbed sights and on forest margins.

The plant was naturalized in New Zealand in 1916, originally as an ornamental plant. It has also been found in Kashmir in Pakistan.

== Ecology ==
This plant is sometimes used as a hedge plant, although it has the potential to spread into fields and deter livestock, and although it may inhibit growth of native plants.

The fruits are spread by birds and mammals, including brush-tailed possums and rodents. The birds which most often spread this plant in New Zealand are themselves exotic frugivores, namely Silvereyes (which self-introduced from Australia), Song Thrush, Common Blackbird, and Common Starling. New Zealand Bellbirds ignore barberry fruits.

Puccinia graminis, a rust fungus, has also been found on this species, during a study to determine fungal pathogens that could be used to control barberry spread in New Zealand.

Goats will eat the plant, if it is up to 2m in height.

Humans in Pakistan also eat the fruit, but only in passing.
