= Delaware Center for Horticulture =

Coordinates: 39.75873°N 75.56132°W

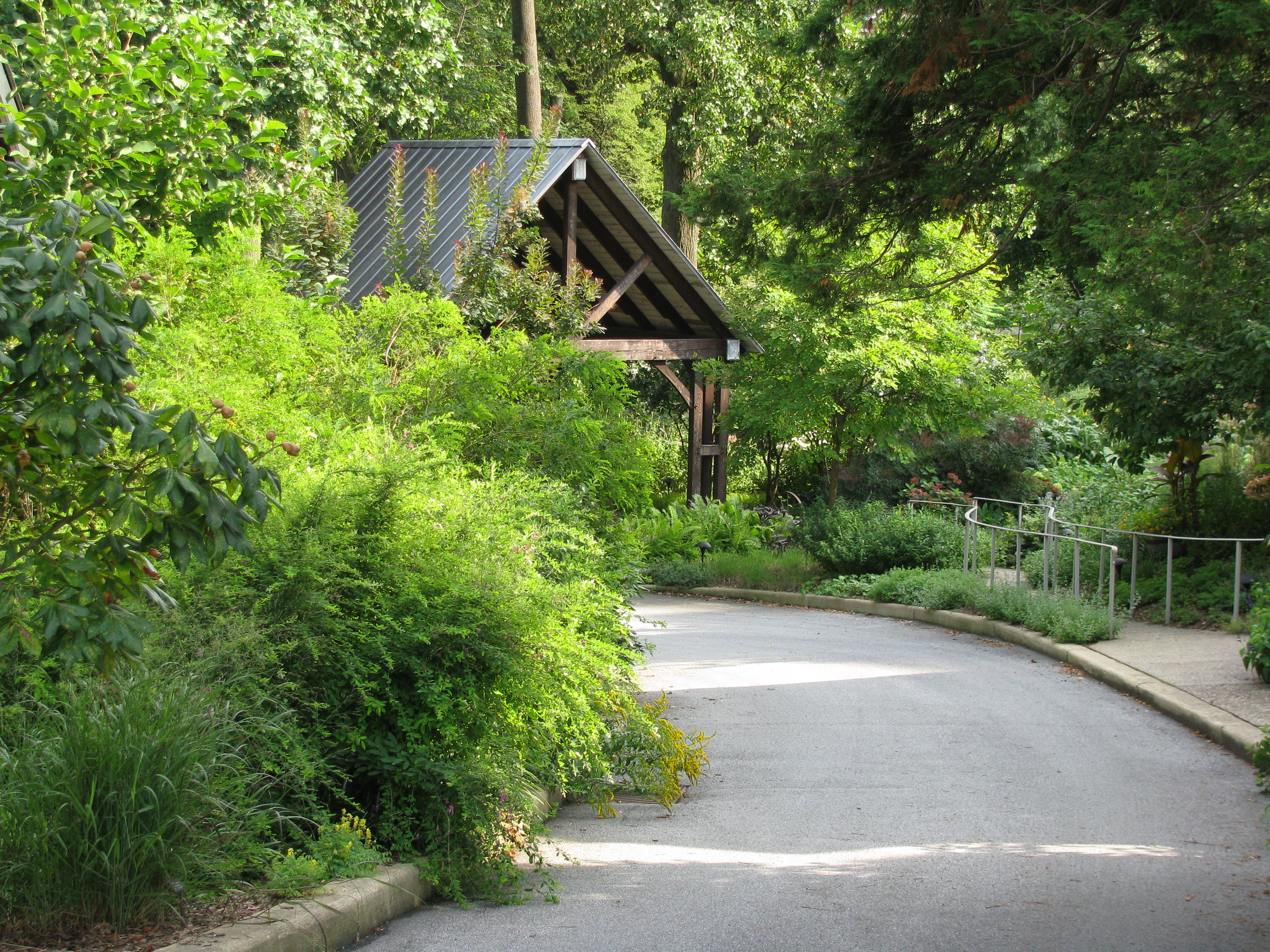
- Interactive map of Delaware Center for Horticulture
- Website: thedch.org

The Delaware Center for Horticulture (DCH) cultivates greener communities by inspiring appreciation and improvement of the environment through horticulture, education and conservation. Founded in 1977, the Center's headquarters in Wilmington's Trolley Square is an oasis in the city. The venue hosts many weddings and corporate events and includes a public demonstration garden that backs up to Brandywine Park, an art gallery, lecture hall, and a greenhouse.

The DCH plants thousands of trees and leads regional projects to enhance Delaware's urban forests; supports community gardens, urban farms, and school gardens; organizes city park improvement projects; beautifies Delaware's roadsides with native vegetation; maintains the landscaping of many traffic medians and streetscapes; and provides educational programs for families and adults. Members of The DCH and more than 700 active volunteers come from Delaware and the surrounding region.

== Mission and focus ==
The Delaware Center for Horticulture inspires individuals and communities through the power of plants. Since 1977, we have cultivated a greener community by creating and maintaining the first Urban Farm in the city of Wilmington, beautifying public landscapes, planting and advising on the placement of urban trees, mobilizing volunteers, and hosting community events and educational programs, including our Branches to Chances® Return to Work program and our Neighborhood Tree Steward Program. Because much of our work occurs in low income neighborhoods with higher rates of disease, environmental contamination, and poor access to healthy foods, our educational efforts also emphasize the personal health and sustainability benefits of gardening.

== Programs ==
The work of The DCH includes community gardens, public landscaping, roadside beautification, tree programs, educational programs and community events.

== City Gardens Contest ==
Now in its 31st year, the Wilmington City Gardens Contest is a friendly competition open to all residents and businesses within the city limits. Winners are announced at the annual awards ceremony in September of each year.

== Rare Plant Auction ==
The Rare Plant Auction is the annual signature event for The DCH. The event is traditionally held at Longwood Gardens in late April of each year. All proceeds benefit the Community Greening Program at The DCH, which uses horticulture to improve the quality of life for residents in urban neighborhoods.

== See also ==
- Horticulture
