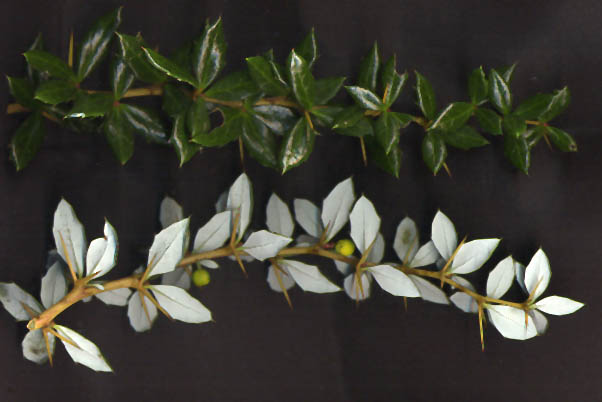
- Upper side of shoot above, lower side below, with flower buds

Scientific classification
- Kingdom: Plantae
- Clade: Tracheophytes
- Clade: Angiosperms
- Clade: Eudicots
- Order: Ranunculales
- Family: Berberidaceae
- Genus: Berberis
- Species: B. verruculosa

Binomial name
- Berberis verruculosa Hemsl. & E.H.Wilson

Synonyms
- Berberis verruculosa f. viridescens C.K.Schneid.

= Berberis verruculosa =

Species of plant

Berberis verruculosa, the warty barberry or warted barberry, is an evergreen shrub in the family Berberidaceae. It ranges in size from 1–2 m, and is native to western China (Gansu, Sichuan, Yunnan). It gets its common name from its "warty" stems, that have rounded, more or less identical, raised spots.

Berberis verruculosa is a shrub up to 100 cm tall, with yellow spines along the twigs. Leaves are 1.5–2 cm long, hard, leathery, glossy dark green above, vivid white below with stomatal wax; in cold winter weather, the leaves may turn purplish-green above on exposed shoots. The flowers are small, yellow, and mature into dark purple berries 6–10 mm long.

== Cultivation ==
Berberis verruculosa is cultivated in temperate climates as an ornamental plant, and grows well in any garden soil. It thrives in shade or partial shade. The plant has been awarded the Royal Horticultural Society's Award of Garden Merit.
