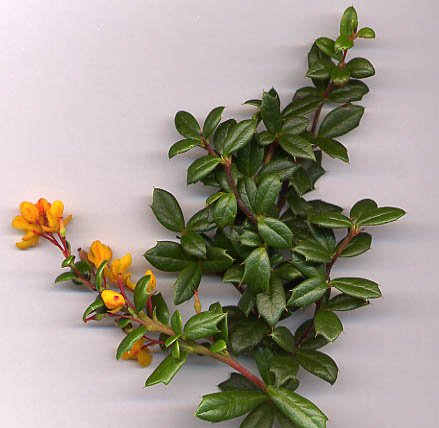
- Berberis darwinii shoot with flowers
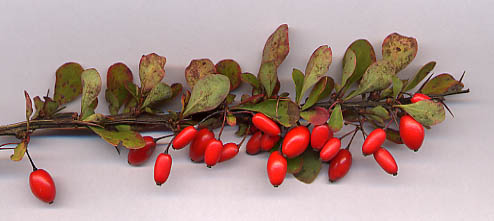
- Berberis thunbergii shoot with fruit

Scientific classification
- Kingdom: Plantae
- Clade: Embryophytes
- Clade: Tracheophytes
- Clade: Spermatophytes
- Clade: Angiosperms
- Clade: Eudicots
- Order: Ranunculales
- Family: Berberidaceae
- Genus: Berberis; L.

Type species
- Berberis vulgaris L.

Species
- List of Berberis and Mahonia species

= Berberis =

Genus of flowering plants representing the barberry family

Berberis (/ˈbɜːrbərɪs/), commonly known as barberry, is a large genus of deciduous and evergreen shrubs from 1–5 m (3 1/2–16 1/2 ft) tall, found throughout temperate and subtropical regions of the world (apart from Australia). Species diversity is greatest in South America and Asia, but native species also appear in Europe, Africa, and North America.

The best-known Berberis species is the type species, B. vulgaris (European barberry), which is common in Europe, North Africa, the Middle East, and central Asia; it has also been widely introduced in North America. Additionally, B. aquifolium is the state flower of Oregon.

== Description ==
The genus Berberis has dimorphic shoots - long shoots that form the structure of the plant and short shoots only 1–2 mm (1/32–3/32 in) long. Many species have spines on the shoots and all along the margins of the leaves. The leaves on long shoots are not photosynthetic, developed into one to three or more spines 3–30 mm (1/8–1 1/8 in) long. The bud in the axil of each thorn-leaf then develops a short shoot with several normal, photosynthetic leaves. These leaves are 1–10 cm (1/2–4 in) long, simple, and either entire, or with spiny margins. Only on young seedlings do leaves develop on the long shoots, with the adult foliage style developing after the young plant is 1–2 years old.

Many deciduous species, such as Berberis thunbergii and B. vulgaris, are noted for their attractive pink or red autumn colour. In some evergreen species from China, such as B. candidula and B. verruculosa, the undersides of the leaves are brilliant white, a feature valued horticulturally. Some horticultural variants of B. thunbergii have dark red to violet foliage, such as B. thunbergii f. atropurpurea 'Admiration', and B. thunbergii f. atropurpurea 'Atropurpurea Nana'.

The flowers are produced singly or in racemes of up to 20 on a single flower head. They are yellow or orange, 3–6 mm (1/8–1/4 in) long, sepals are usually six, rarely three or nine, and the six petals are in alternating whorls of three, and the sepals are usually coloured like the petals. The fruit is a small berry 5–15 mm (1/4–5/8 in) long, ripening red or dark blue, often with a pink or violet waxy surface bloom; in some species, they may be long and narrow, but are spherical in other species.

Some authors regard the compound-leaved species as belonging to a different genus, Mahonia. No consistent differences are noted between the two groups other than the leaf pinnation (Berberis sensu stricto species appear to have simple leaves, but these are in reality compound with a single leaflet; they are termed "unifoliolate"), and many botanists prefer to classify all these plants in the single genus Berberis. However, a DNA-based phylogenetic study retains the two separate genera, by clarifying that unifoliolate-leaved Berberis s.s. is derived from within a paraphyletic group of shrubs bearing imparipinnate evergreen leaves, which the paper then divides into three genera: Mahonia, Alloberberis (formerly Mahonia section Horridae), and Moranothamnus (formerly Berberis claireae); it confirms that a broadly circumscribed Berberis (that is, including Mahonia, Alloberberis, and Moranothamnus) is monophyletic.

== Ecology ==
Berberis species are used as food plants by the larvae of some Lepidoptera species, including the moths barberry carpet moth (Pareulype berberata), and mottled pug (Eupithecia exiguata).

Berberis species can infect wheat with stem rust, a serious fungal disease of wheat and related grains. B. vulgaris (European barberry) and B. canadensis (American barberry) serve as alternate host species of the rust fungus responsible, Puccinia graminis. For this reason, cultivation of B. vulgaris is prohibited in many areas, and imports to the United States are forbidden. The North American B. canadensis, native to Appalachia and the Midwestern U.S., was nearly eradicated for this reason, and is now rarely seen extant, with the most remaining occurrences in the Virginia mountains.

Some Berberis species have become invasive when planted outside of their native ranges, including B. glaucocarpa and B. darwinii in New Zealand (where it is now banned from sale and propagation), as well as B. vulgaris and green-leaved B. thunbergii in much of the eastern U.S.

Japanese barberry is considered an invasive plant in 32 U.S. states. It is deer-resistant because of its taste and is favored as a shelter for ticks capable of transmitting Lyme disease.

== Cultivation ==
Several species of Berberis are favored as garden shrubs, grown for such features as ornamental leaves, yellow flowers, or red or blue-black berries. Numerous cultivars and hybrids have been selected for garden use. Low-growing Berberis plants are also commonly planted as pedestrian barriers. Taller-growing species are valued for crime prevention; being dense and viciously spiny, they are effective barriers to burglars; accordingly, they may be planted below vulnerable windows, and used as hedges. Many species are resistant to predation by deer.

Species in cultivation include:

- B. darwinii
- B. dictyophylla
- B. julianae
- B. thunbergii
- B. verruculosa

The following hybrid selections have gained the Royal Horticultural Society's Award of Garden Merit:

- B. 'Georgei'
- B. × lologensis 'Apricot Queen'
- B. × media 'Red Jewel'
- B. × stenophylla 'Corallina Compacta'
- B. × stenophylla (golden barberry)

== Uses ==
=== Culinary ===
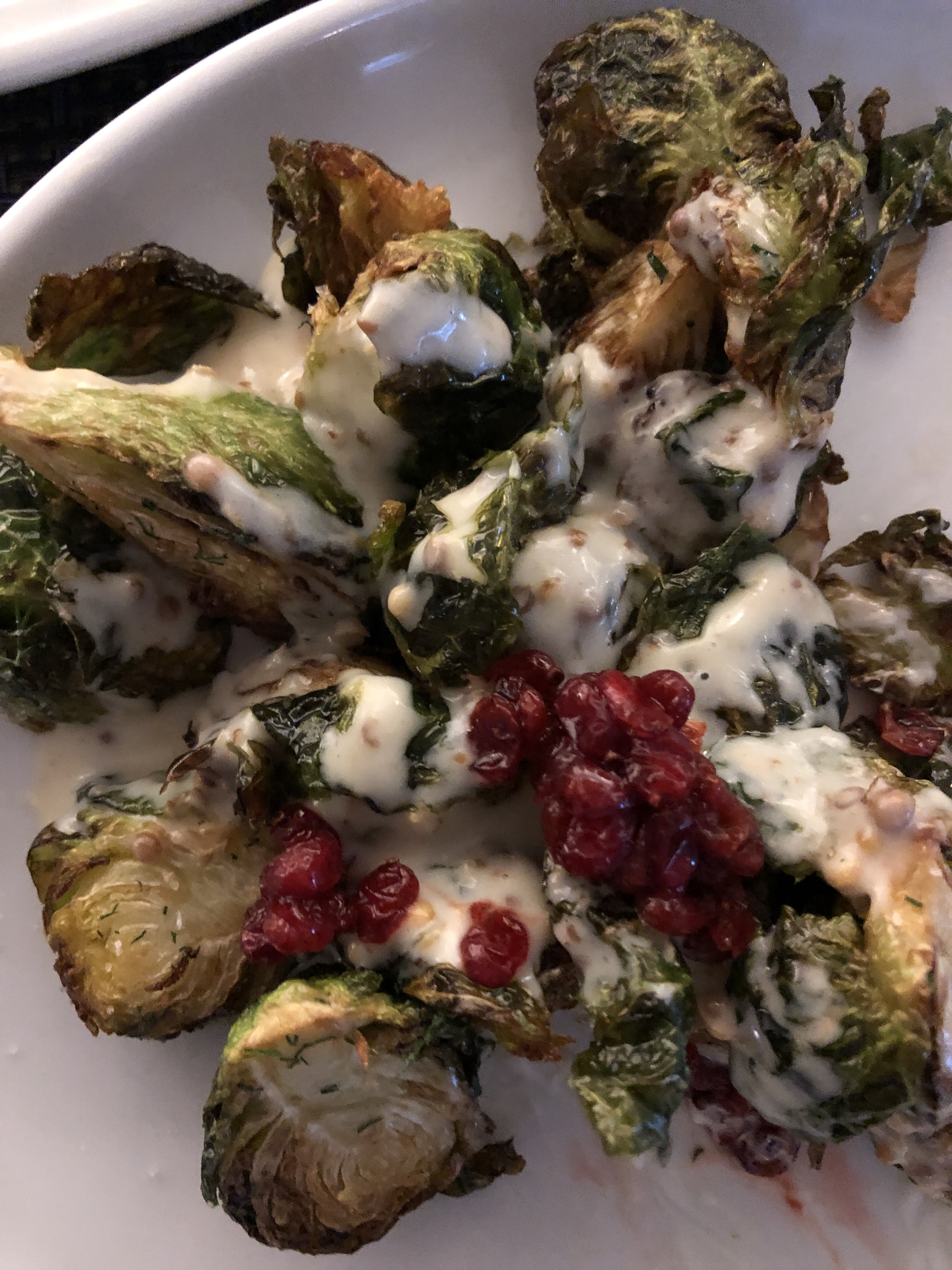
Crispy Brussels sprouts with barberries on top

Berberis vulgaris grows in the wild in much of Europe and West Asia. It produces large crops of edible berries, rich in vitamin C, but with a sharp, acid flavor. In Europe for many centuries, the berries were used for culinary purposes much as citrus peel is used. The country in which they are used the most is Iran, where they are referred to as zereshk (زرشک) in Persian. The berries are common in Persian cuisine in rice dishes, such as zereshk polo (a dish of rice cooked in the Persian style with saffron and barberries, often served with chicken) and morassa polo (literal translation "bejewelled rice", an opulent dish of rice with barberries and slivers of pistachio, almond, and orange peel), and as a flavouring for poultry. Because of their sour flavor, they are sometimes cooked with sugar before being added to Persian rice. Iranian markets sell dried zereshk. By virtue of their limited availability, specialised growing conditions, and the complexity of the harvesting process, they are considered expensive, so are served in the finest of Persian dishes. In Russia and Eastern Europe, they are sometimes used in jams as a source of pectin (especially with mixed berries). An extract of barberries is a common flavoring for soft drinks, candies, and sweets.

B. aquifolium (Oregon grape) was traditionally eaten in small quantities by Pacific Northwest tribes of North America.

Berberis microphylla and B. darwinii (both known as calafate and michay) are two species found in Patagonia in Argentina and Chile. Their edible purple fruit are used for jams and infusions.

=== Traditional medicine and adverse effects ===
The dried fruit of B. vulgaris is used in herbal medicine. The chemical constituents include isoquinoline alkaloids, especially berberine. A full list of phytochemicals was compiled and published in 2014. The safety of using berberine for any condition is not adequately defined by high-quality clinical research. Its potential for causing adverse effects is high, including untoward interactions with prescription drugs, reducing the intended effect of established therapies. Nausea, vomiting, diarrhea, dizziness, and fainting are possible effects, particularly with high doses. It is particularly unsafe for use during pregnancy.

=== Other uses ===
Historically, yellow dye was extracted from the stem, root, and bark.

The thorns of the barberry shrub have been used to clean ancient gold coins, as they are soft enough that they will not damage the surface, but will remove corrosion and debris.

The acidic young leaves are sometimes chewed for refreshment by parched hikers.

== In culture ==
Oregon grape is the state flower of Oregon.

== Gallery ==
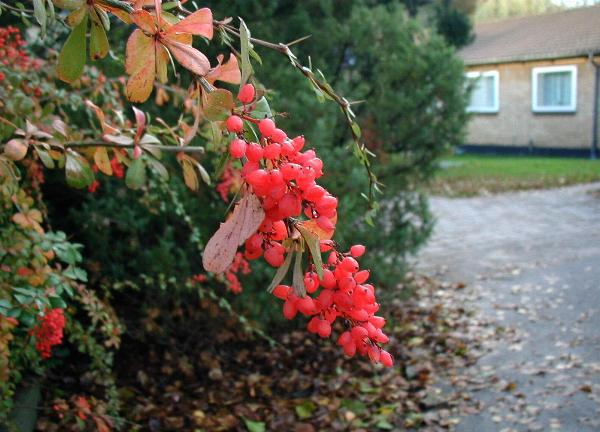
Berberis aggregata fruit

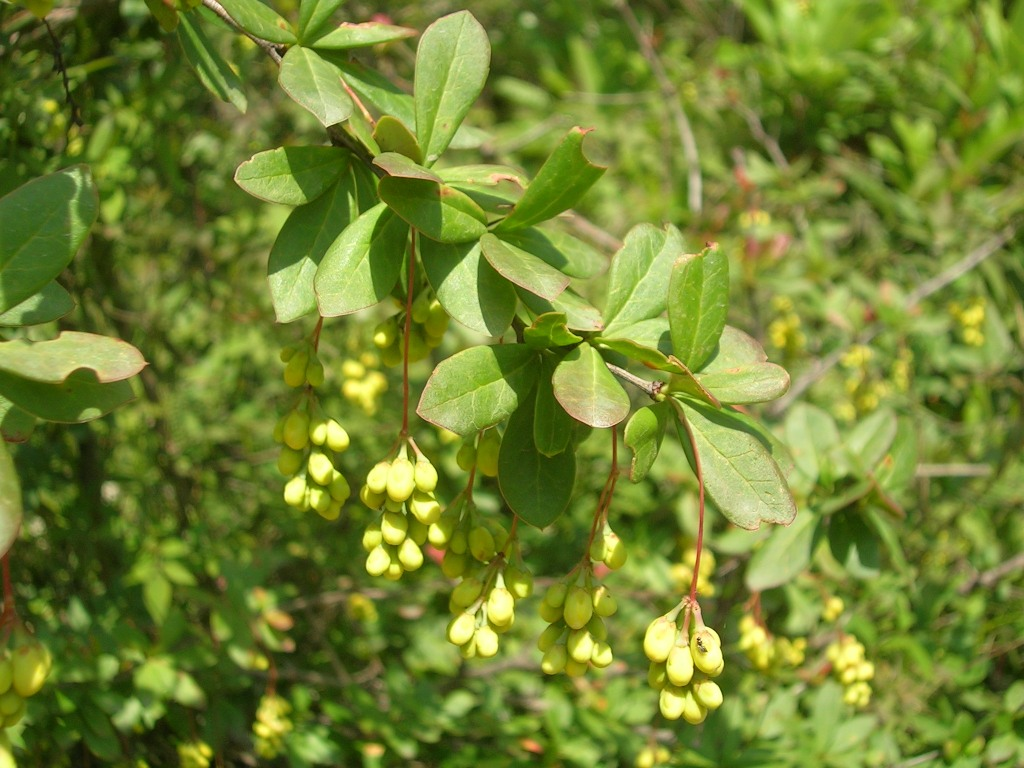
B. aristata, from the Himalayas

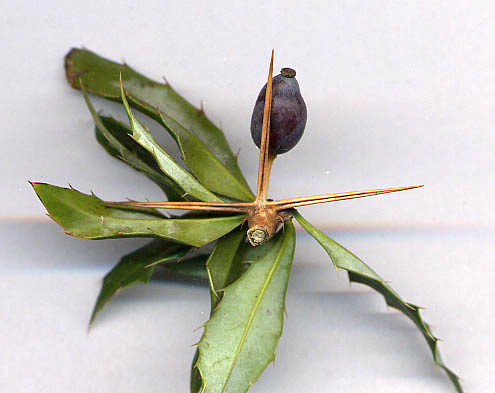
B. gagnepainii with 20 mm (3/4 in) thorn-leaves

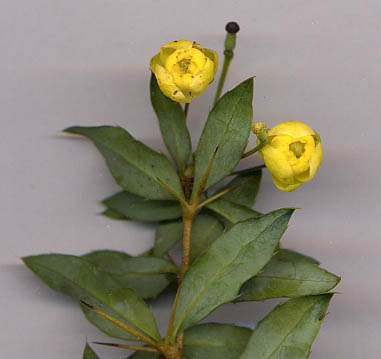
B. gagnepainii flowers, 7 mm (1/4 in) wide

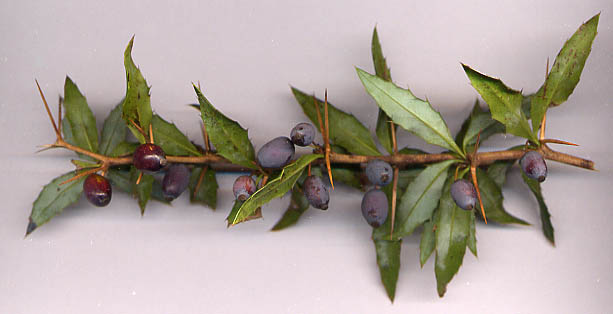
B. gagnepainii fruit

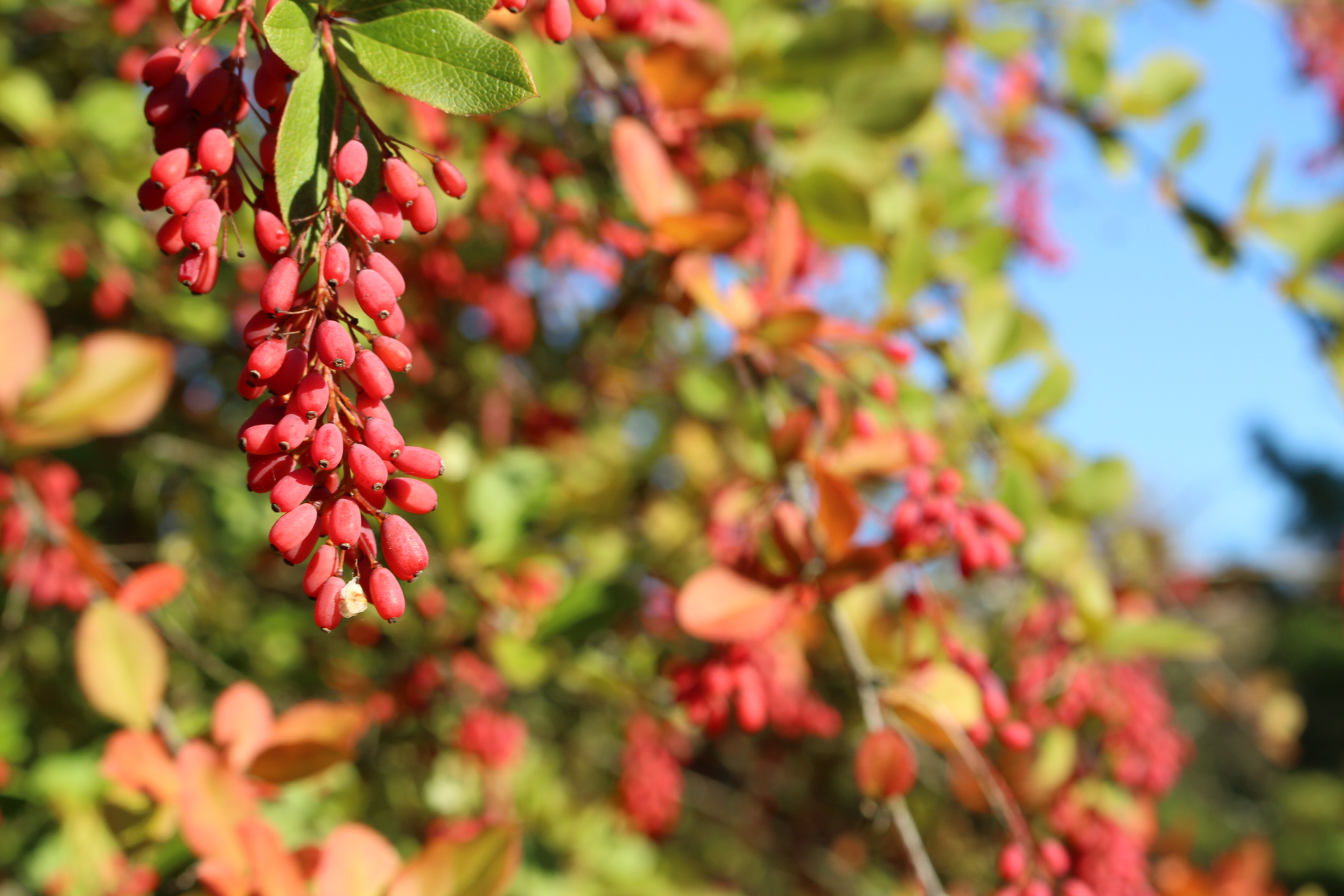
B. prattii fruit

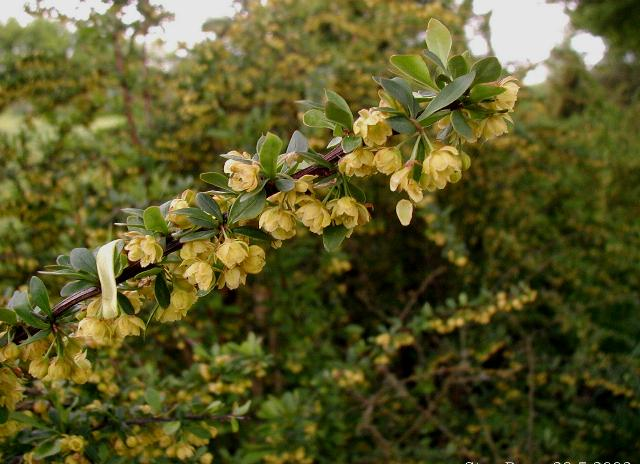
B. thunbergii shrub

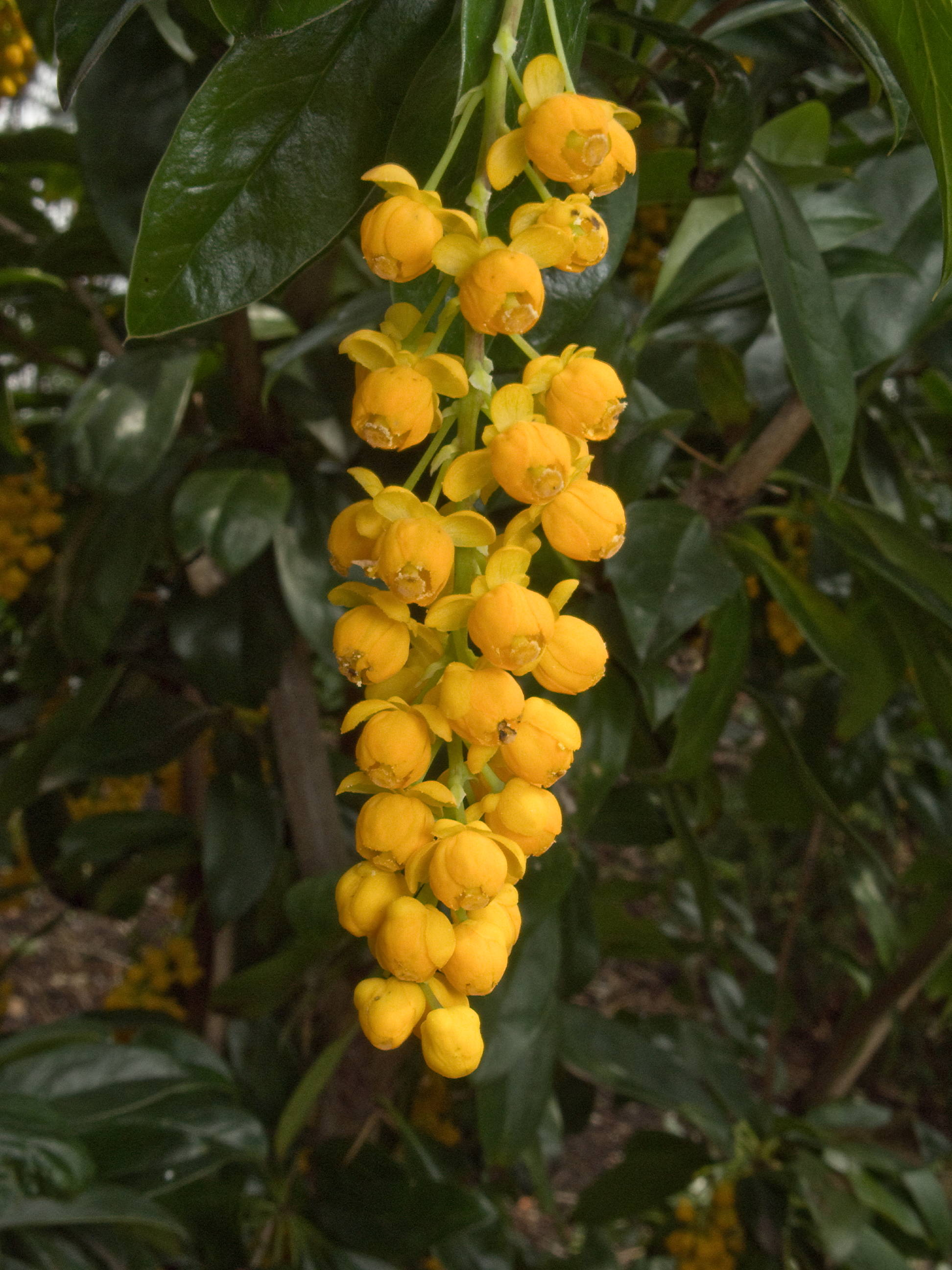
B. valdiviana, flowers from Chile (cultivated in the UK)

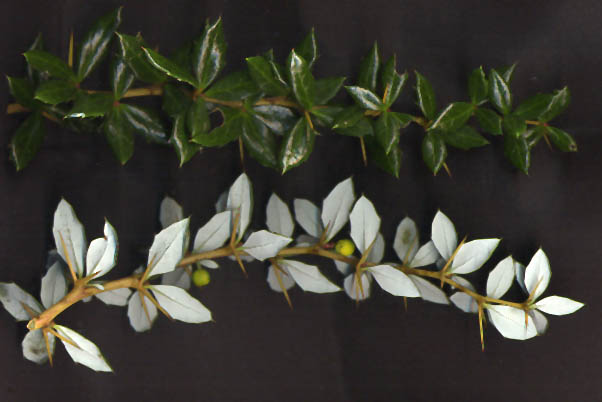
B. verruculosa, upper side of shoot above, lower side below

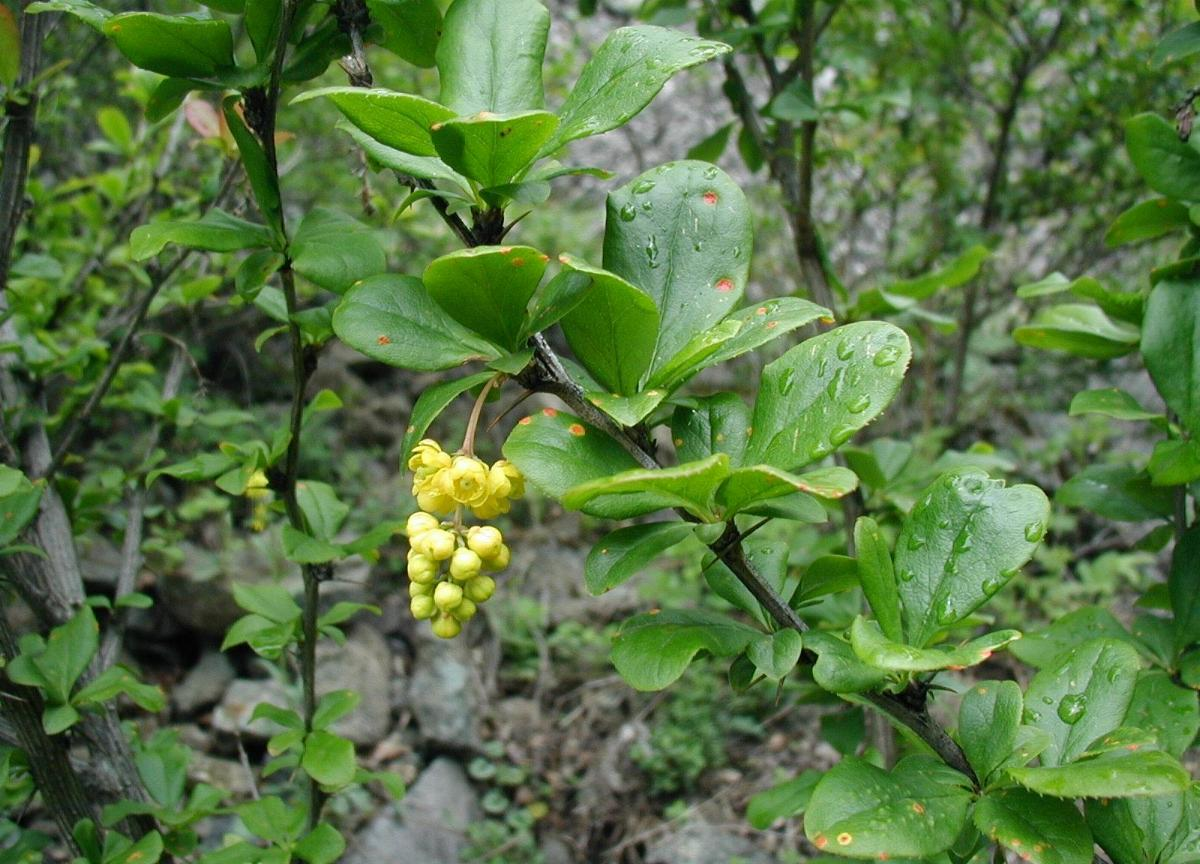
B. vulgaris flowers and foliage, cultivated in Denmark

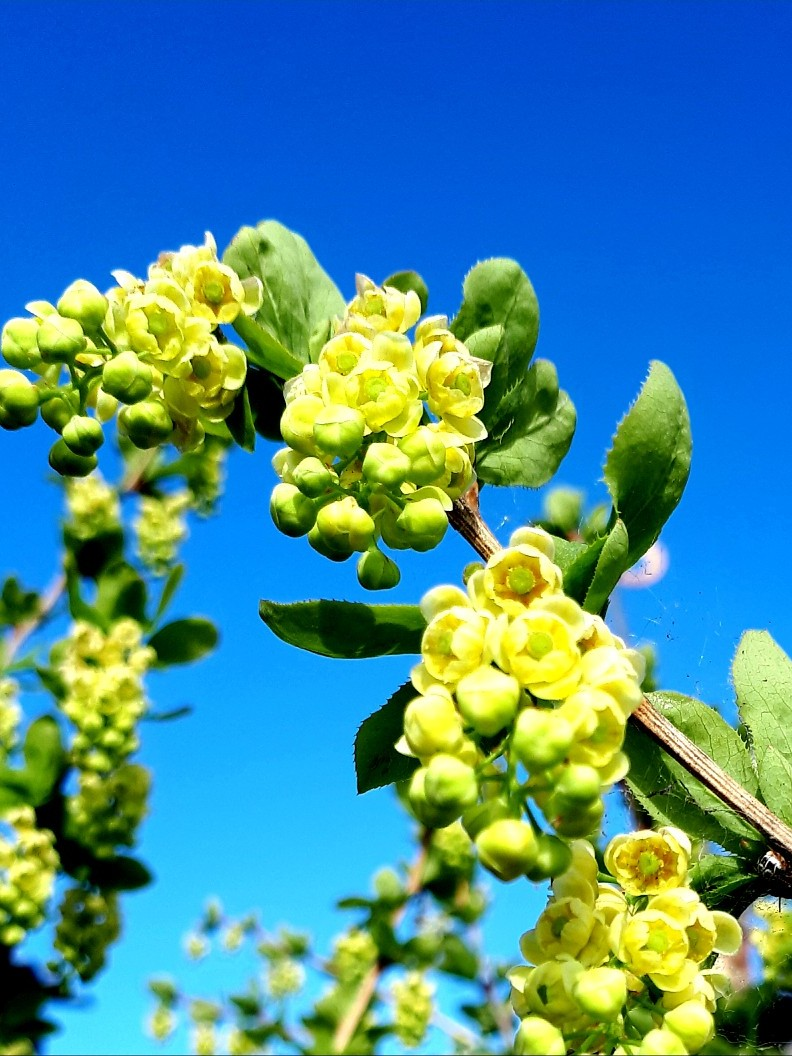
Barberry blossom in Eastern Siberia
