= 2005 in paleontology =

Paleontology or palaeontology is the study of prehistoric life forms on Earth through the examination of plant and animal fossils. This includes the study of body fossils, tracks (ichnites), burrows, cast-off parts, fossilised feces (coprolites), palynomorphs and chemical residues. Because humans have encountered fossils for millennia, paleontology has a long history both before and after becoming formalized as a science. This article records significant discoveries and events related to paleontology that occurred or were published in the year 2005.

== Protozoans ==
| Name | Novelty | Status | Authors | Age | Unit | Location | Notes | Images |
|---|---|---|---|---|---|---|---|---|
| Trypanosoma antiquus | Valid | Poinar | Burdigalian | Dominican amber | Dominican Republic | Oldest record of the vector association between Triatoma and Trypanosoma | Trypanosoma antiquus | |

== Diatoms ==
| Name | Novelty | Status | Authors | Age | Type locality | Location | Notes | Images |
|---|---|---|---|---|---|---|---|---|
| Eoseria | Gen et sp nov | valid | Wolfe & Edlund | Early Eocene; Ypresian | Eocene Okanagan Highlands; Horsefly shales | Canada; British Columbia | An aulacoseiraceous freshwater diatom The type species is E. wilsonii | |

== Plants ==
=== Conifers ===
| Name | Novelty | Status | Authors | Age | Type locality | Location | Notes | Images |
|---|---|---|---|---|---|---|---|---|
| Homalcoia | Gen et Sp nov | Valid | Hernandez-Castillo, Stockey & Beard | Earliest Eocene | "Appian Way Beds" | Canada; British Columbia | A cupressaceous pollen cone. The type species is H. littoralis | |

=== Angiosperms ===
| Name | Novelty | Status | Authors | Age | Type locality | Location | Notes | Images |
|---|---|---|---|---|---|---|---|---|
| Albertarum | Gen et sp nov | | Bogner, Hoffman, & Aulenback | Cretaceous; Late Campanian | Horseshoe Canyon Formation | Canada; Alberta | An orontioid Infructescence. The type species is A. pueri. | |
| Archaeamphora | Gen et sp nov | dubious | Li | Early Cretaceous | Jianshangou Formation | China | The type species is Archaeamphora longicervia | Archaeamphora longicervia |
| Corylopsis reedae | sp nov | Valid | Radtke, Pigg, & Wehr | Early Eocene; Ypresian | Eocene Okanagan Highlands; Klondike Mountain Formation | USA; Washington | A Corylopsis species | Corylopsis reedae |
| Fothergilla malloryi | sp nov | Valid | Radtke, Pigg, & Wehr | Early Eocene; Ypresian | Eocene Okanagan Highlands; Klondike Mountain Formation | USA; Washington | A Fothergilla species | Fothergilla malloryi |
| Shirleya | Gen et Sp nov | Valid | Pigg & DeVore | Middle Miocene | "Yakima Canyon Flora" | USA; Washington | A crape myrtle relative, type species S. grahamae | Shirleya grahamae |
| Ulmus okanaganensis | sp nov | valid | Denk & Dillhoff | Early Eocene; Ypresian | Eocene Okanagan Highlands; Tranquille Formation; McAbee Fossil Beds | Canada; British Columbia | An elm species. Also found in other Eocene Okanagan Highlands locations. | Ulmus okanaganensis |
| Teixeiraea | Gen et sp nov | | von Balthazar, Pedersen and Friis | Cretaceous | Vale de Agua 320 | Portugal | A plant ascribed to Ranunculales. The type species is T. lusitanica. | |

== Fungi ==
| Name | Novelty | Status | Authors | Age | Type locality | Location | Notes | Images |
|---|---|---|---|---|---|---|---|---|
| Pteropus | Gen et sp nov | | Van der Ham & Dortangs | Cretaceous; Maastrichtian | Maastricht Formation | The Netherlands | A ascomycetous fungus in Brachyphyllum patens foliage The type species is P. brachyphylli | |
| Stigmatomyces succini | Sp nov | valid | Rossi, Kotrba, & Triebel | Eocene; Priabonian | Baltic amber | Europe | A laboulbeniaceous parasite of Prosphyracephala succini | |

== Arthropoda ==
=== Arachnids ===
| Name | Novelty | Status | Authors | Age | Type locality | Location | Notes | Images |
|---|---|---|---|---|---|---|---|---|
| Halitherses | Gen et sp nov | valid | Giribet & Dunlop | Cretaceous; Cenomanian | Burmese amber | Myanmar | An ortholasmatine nemastomatid harvestman. Type species is H. grimaldii | |

=== Insects ===
| Name | Novelty | Status | Authors | Age | Type locality | Location | Notes | Images |
|---|---|---|---|---|---|---|---|---|
| Acropyga glaesaria | Sp nov | Valid | Lapolla | Miocene; Burdigalian | Dominican amber | Dominican Republic | Oldest record of trophophoresy in ants | Acropyga glaesaria |
| Araripenymphes | Gen et sp nov | Valid | Menon, Martins-Neto, & Martill | Cretaceous; Aptian | Crato Formation | Brazil | A nymphid lacewing | |
| Cananeuretus | Gen et sp nov | Valid | Engel & Grimaldi | Cretaceous; Campanian | Canadian amber | Canada | A possible Aneuretinae ant. Type sp. C. occidentalis | |
| Culex malariager | Sp nov | valid | Poinar | Miocene; Burdigalian | Dominican amber | Dominican Republic | A mosquito, a vector of Plasmodium dominicana | Culex malariager |
| Dinokanaga | Gen et sp nov | Valid | Archibald | Eocene; Ypresian | Eocene Okanagan Highlands; Tranquille Formation; McAbee Fossil Beds | Canada; British Columbia | Six species named D. andersoni, D. dowsonae, D. hillsi, D. sternbergi, D. webbi, D. wilsoni | Dinokanaga andersoni |
| Eorhachiberotha | Gen et sp nov | homonym | Nel Et al. | Eocene; Ypresian | Oise amber | France | A rhachiberothide lacewing, Genus name preoccupied by Eorhachiberotha Engel, 2004; Moved to Oisea Nel et al 2005 | Oisea celinea |
| Jeanlegrandia | Gen et sp nov | valid | Nel, Petrulevicius, & Jarzembowski | Chattian | Les Figons | France | A Libellulid dragonfly, the type species is J. oligocenica | Jeanlegrandia oligocenica |
| Myanmyrma | Gen et sp nov | Valid | Engel & Grimaldi | Cretaceous; Earliest Cenomanian | Burmese amber | Myanmar | A sphecomyrmine ant. The type species is M. gracilis | Myanmyrma gracilis |
| Oisea | Gen et comb nov | valid | Nel Et al. | Eocene; Ypresian | Oise amber | France | A rhachiberothide lacewing, A new genus name for Eorhachiberotha Nel et al 2005 | Oisea celinea |
| Sphecomyrma | Gen et sp nov | jr synonym | Engel & Grimaldi | Cretaceous earliest Cenomanian | Burmese amber | Myanmar | A stem group ant, jr syn of Gerontoformica orientalis | G. orientalis worker |
| Triatoma dominicana | Sp nov | Valid | Poinar | Miocene; Burdigalian | Dominican amber | Dominican Republic | Oldest record of the vector association between Triatoma and Trypanosoma | Triatoma dominicana |

== Xiphosurans ==
- Fossils of Lunataspis, the earliest known xiphosuran, are discovered in Canada. It was not given a formal description until 2008, however.

== Plesiosaurs ==
=== New taxa ===
| Name | Status | Authors | Location | Notes |
|---|---|---|---|---|
| Eromangasaurus | Valid | Kear | Australia | |

== Archosauromorphs ==
=== Newly named Non-Avian dinosaurs ===
Data courtesy of George Olshevsky's dinosaur genera list.

| Name | Status | Authors | Age | Location | Notes | Images |
|---|---|---|---|---|---|---|
| Appalachiosaurus | Valid taxon | Carr; Williamson; Schwimmer | Late Cretaceous | USA | A Tyrannosaurid from Appalachia | Appalachiosaurus Auroraceratops Brachytrachelopan Buitreraptor Changchunsaurus Chebsaurus Dubreuillosaurus Falcarius Hagryphus Jinfengopteryx Lanzhousaurus Puertasaurus Stormbergia Tanycolagreus Tyrannotitan |
| Archaeodontosaurus | Valid taxon | Eric Buffetaut | Middle Jurassic | Madagascar | An early Sauropod | Appalachiosaurus Auroraceratops Brachytrachelopan Buitreraptor Changchunsaurus Chebsaurus Dubreuillosaurus Falcarius Hagryphus Jinfengopteryx Lanzhousaurus Puertasaurus Stormbergia Tanycolagreus Tyrannotitan |
| Auroraceratops | Valid taxon | You; Li D.; et al. (Note: You, Li D., Ji Q., Lamanna, Peter Dodson.) | Early Cretaceous | China | | Appalachiosaurus Auroraceratops Brachytrachelopan Buitreraptor Changchunsaurus Chebsaurus Dubreuillosaurus Falcarius Hagryphus Jinfengopteryx Lanzhousaurus Puertasaurus Stormbergia Tanycolagreus Tyrannotitan |
| "Bakesaurus" | Nomen nudum | Zhou S. | | | | Appalachiosaurus Auroraceratops Brachytrachelopan Buitreraptor Changchunsaurus Chebsaurus Dubreuillosaurus Falcarius Hagryphus Jinfengopteryx Lanzhousaurus Puertasaurus Stormbergia Tanycolagreus Tyrannotitan |
| Baurutitan | Valid taxon | Kellner; Campos; Trotta | Late Cretaceous | Brazil | | Appalachiosaurus Auroraceratops Brachytrachelopan Buitreraptor Changchunsaurus Chebsaurus Dubreuillosaurus Falcarius Hagryphus Jinfengopteryx Lanzhousaurus Puertasaurus Stormbergia Tanycolagreus Tyrannotitan |
| Brachytrachelopan | Valid taxon | Rauhut; Remes; et al. (Note: Rauhut, Remes, Fechner, Cladera, Puerta.) | Middle Jurassic | Argentina | A short necked Sauropod | Appalachiosaurus Auroraceratops Brachytrachelopan Buitreraptor Changchunsaurus Chebsaurus Dubreuillosaurus Falcarius Hagryphus Jinfengopteryx Lanzhousaurus Puertasaurus Stormbergia Tanycolagreus Tyrannotitan |
| Buitreraptor | Valid taxon | Makovicky; Apesteguía; Agnolín | Late Cretaceous | Argentina | A small fish eating raptor | Appalachiosaurus Auroraceratops Brachytrachelopan Buitreraptor Changchunsaurus Chebsaurus Dubreuillosaurus Falcarius Hagryphus Jinfengopteryx Lanzhousaurus Puertasaurus Stormbergia Tanycolagreus Tyrannotitan |
| Cathartesaura | Valid taxon | Gallina; Apesteguía | Late Cretaceous | Argentina | | Appalachiosaurus Auroraceratops Brachytrachelopan Buitreraptor Changchunsaurus Chebsaurus Dubreuillosaurus Falcarius Hagryphus Jinfengopteryx Lanzhousaurus Puertasaurus Stormbergia Tanycolagreus Tyrannotitan |
| Changchunsaurus | Valid taxon | Zan; Chen J.; et al. (Note: Zan, Chen J., Jin L., Li T.) | Early Cretaceous | China | a primitive Ornithopod | Appalachiosaurus Auroraceratops Brachytrachelopan Buitreraptor Changchunsaurus Chebsaurus Dubreuillosaurus Falcarius Hagryphus Jinfengopteryx Lanzhousaurus Puertasaurus Stormbergia Tanycolagreus Tyrannotitan |
| Chebsaurus | Valid taxon | Mahammed; Läng; et al. (Note: Mahammed, Läng, Mami, Mekahli, Benhamou, Bouterfa, Kacemi, Chérief, Chaouti, Philippe Taquet.) | from Middle Jurassic to Late Jurassic | Algeria | | Appalachiosaurus Auroraceratops Brachytrachelopan Buitreraptor Changchunsaurus Chebsaurus Dubreuillosaurus Falcarius Hagryphus Jinfengopteryx Lanzhousaurus Puertasaurus Stormbergia Tanycolagreus Tyrannotitan |
| Condorraptor | Valid taxon | Rauhut | Middle Jurassic | Argentina | | Appalachiosaurus Auroraceratops Brachytrachelopan Buitreraptor Changchunsaurus Chebsaurus Dubreuillosaurus Falcarius Hagryphus Jinfengopteryx Lanzhousaurus Puertasaurus Stormbergia Tanycolagreus Tyrannotitan |
| Daanosaurus | Valid taxon | Ye; Gao Y.; Jiang | Late Jurassic | China | | Appalachiosaurus Auroraceratops Brachytrachelopan Buitreraptor Changchunsaurus Chebsaurus Dubreuillosaurus Falcarius Hagryphus Jinfengopteryx Lanzhousaurus Puertasaurus Stormbergia Tanycolagreus Tyrannotitan |
| Dashanpusaurus | Valid taxon | Peng G.; Ye; et al. (Note: Peng G., Ye, Gao Y., Shu, Jiang.) | from middle Jurassic to Late Jurassic | China | | Appalachiosaurus Auroraceratops Brachytrachelopan Buitreraptor Changchunsaurus Chebsaurus Dubreuillosaurus Falcarius Hagryphus Jinfengopteryx Lanzhousaurus Puertasaurus Stormbergia Tanycolagreus Tyrannotitan |
| Dubreuillosaurus | Valid taxon | Allain | | France | | Appalachiosaurus Auroraceratops Brachytrachelopan Buitreraptor Changchunsaurus Chebsaurus Dubreuillosaurus Falcarius Hagryphus Jinfengopteryx Lanzhousaurus Puertasaurus Stormbergia Tanycolagreus Tyrannotitan |
| Falcarius | Valid taxon | James Kirkland; Zanno; et al. (Note: James Kirkland, Zanno, Sampson, Clark, DeBlieux.) | Early Cretaceous | USA | An early Therizinosaur | Appalachiosaurus Auroraceratops Brachytrachelopan Buitreraptor Changchunsaurus Chebsaurus Dubreuillosaurus Falcarius Hagryphus Jinfengopteryx Lanzhousaurus Puertasaurus Stormbergia Tanycolagreus Tyrannotitan |
| Ferganocephale | Valid taxon | Averianov; T. Martin; Bakirov | Middle Jurassic | Kyrgyzstan | An early Pachycephalosaur | Appalachiosaurus Auroraceratops Brachytrachelopan Buitreraptor Changchunsaurus Chebsaurus Dubreuillosaurus Falcarius Hagryphus Jinfengopteryx Lanzhousaurus Puertasaurus Stormbergia Tanycolagreus Tyrannotitan |
| "Galveosaurus" | Junior synonym | Sánchez-Hernández | | | Junior synonym of Galvesaurus. | Appalachiosaurus Auroraceratops Brachytrachelopan Buitreraptor Changchunsaurus Chebsaurus Dubreuillosaurus Falcarius Hagryphus Jinfengopteryx Lanzhousaurus Puertasaurus Stormbergia Tanycolagreus Tyrannotitan |
| Galvesaurus | Valid taxon | Barco; Canudo; et al. (Note: Barco, Canudo, Cuenca-Bescós, Ruíz-Omeñaca.) | Early Cretaceous | Spain | | Appalachiosaurus Auroraceratops Brachytrachelopan Buitreraptor Changchunsaurus Chebsaurus Dubreuillosaurus Falcarius Hagryphus Jinfengopteryx Lanzhousaurus Puertasaurus Stormbergia Tanycolagreus Tyrannotitan |
| Hagryphus | Valid taxon | Zanno; Sampson | Late Cretaceous | United States | | Appalachiosaurus Auroraceratops Brachytrachelopan Buitreraptor Changchunsaurus Chebsaurus Dubreuillosaurus Falcarius Hagryphus Jinfengopteryx Lanzhousaurus Puertasaurus Stormbergia Tanycolagreus Tyrannotitan |
| Hexinlusaurus | Valid taxon | Barrett; Butler; Knoll | Middle Jurassic | China | | Appalachiosaurus Auroraceratops Brachytrachelopan Buitreraptor Changchunsaurus Chebsaurus Dubreuillosaurus Falcarius Hagryphus Jinfengopteryx Lanzhousaurus Puertasaurus Stormbergia Tanycolagreus Tyrannotitan |
| Hungarosaurus | Valid taxon | Ösi | Late Cretaceous | Hungary | | Appalachiosaurus Auroraceratops Brachytrachelopan Buitreraptor Changchunsaurus Chebsaurus Dubreuillosaurus Falcarius Hagryphus Jinfengopteryx Lanzhousaurus Puertasaurus Stormbergia Tanycolagreus Tyrannotitan |
| Jinfengopteryx | Valid taxon | Ji Q.; Ji S.; et al. (Note: Ji Q., Ji S., Lü, You, Chen W., Liu Y. Q., Liu Y. X.) | Early Cretaceous | China | | Appalachiosaurus Auroraceratops Brachytrachelopan Buitreraptor Changchunsaurus Chebsaurus Dubreuillosaurus Falcarius Hagryphus Jinfengopteryx Lanzhousaurus Puertasaurus Stormbergia Tanycolagreus Tyrannotitan |
| Karongasaurus | Valid taxon | Gomani | Early Cretaceous | Malawi | | Appalachiosaurus Auroraceratops Brachytrachelopan Buitreraptor Changchunsaurus Chebsaurus Dubreuillosaurus Falcarius Hagryphus Jinfengopteryx Lanzhousaurus Puertasaurus Stormbergia Tanycolagreus Tyrannotitan |
| Lanzhousaurus | Valid taxon | You; Ji Q.; Li D. | Early Cretaceous | China | | Appalachiosaurus Auroraceratops Brachytrachelopan Buitreraptor Changchunsaurus Chebsaurus Dubreuillosaurus Falcarius Hagryphus Jinfengopteryx Lanzhousaurus Puertasaurus Stormbergia Tanycolagreus Tyrannotitan |
| Nemegtomaia | Valid taxon | Lü; Tomida; et al. (Note: Lü, Tomida, Azuma, Dong Zhiming, Lee.) | Late Cretaceous | Mongolia | | Appalachiosaurus Auroraceratops Brachytrachelopan Buitreraptor Changchunsaurus Chebsaurus Dubreuillosaurus Falcarius Hagryphus Jinfengopteryx Lanzhousaurus Puertasaurus Stormbergia Tanycolagreus Tyrannotitan |
| Neuquenraptor | Valid taxon | Novas Pol | Late Cretaceous | Argentina | May be a subjective junior synonym of Unenlagia. | Appalachiosaurus Auroraceratops Brachytrachelopan Buitreraptor Changchunsaurus Chebsaurus Dubreuillosaurus Falcarius Hagryphus Jinfengopteryx Lanzhousaurus Puertasaurus Stormbergia Tanycolagreus Tyrannotitan |
| Pedopenna | Valid taxon | Xu X.; Zhang F. | Middle Jurassic | China | | Appalachiosaurus Auroraceratops Brachytrachelopan Buitreraptor Changchunsaurus Chebsaurus Dubreuillosaurus Falcarius Hagryphus Jinfengopteryx Lanzhousaurus Puertasaurus Stormbergia Tanycolagreus Tyrannotitan |
| Penelopognathus | Valid taxon | Godefroit; Li H.; Shang | Early Cretaceous | China | | Appalachiosaurus Auroraceratops Brachytrachelopan Buitreraptor Changchunsaurus Chebsaurus Dubreuillosaurus Falcarius Hagryphus Jinfengopteryx Lanzhousaurus Puertasaurus Stormbergia Tanycolagreus Tyrannotitan |
| Puertasaurus | Valid taxon | Novas; Salgado; et al. (Note: Novas, Salgado, Calvo, Agnolin.) | Late Cretaceous | Argentina | | Appalachiosaurus Auroraceratops Brachytrachelopan Buitreraptor Changchunsaurus Chebsaurus Dubreuillosaurus Falcarius Hagryphus Jinfengopteryx Lanzhousaurus Puertasaurus Stormbergia Tanycolagreus Tyrannotitan |
| Shixinggia | Valid taxon | Lü; Zhang B. | Late Cretaceous | China | | Appalachiosaurus Auroraceratops Brachytrachelopan Buitreraptor Changchunsaurus Chebsaurus Dubreuillosaurus Falcarius Hagryphus Jinfengopteryx Lanzhousaurus Puertasaurus Stormbergia Tanycolagreus Tyrannotitan |
| Stormbergia | Valid taxon | Butler | Early Jurassic | Lesotho South Africa | A primitive Ornithischian | Appalachiosaurus Auroraceratops Brachytrachelopan Buitreraptor Changchunsaurus Chebsaurus Dubreuillosaurus Falcarius Hagryphus Jinfengopteryx Lanzhousaurus Puertasaurus Stormbergia Tanycolagreus Tyrannotitan |
| Tanycolagreus | Valid taxon | Carpenter; Miles; Cloward | Late Jurassic | USA | A primitive Tyrannosaur | Appalachiosaurus Auroraceratops Brachytrachelopan Buitreraptor Changchunsaurus Chebsaurus Dubreuillosaurus Falcarius Hagryphus Jinfengopteryx Lanzhousaurus Puertasaurus Stormbergia Tanycolagreus Tyrannotitan |
| Trigonosaurus | Disputed | Campos; Kellner; et al. (Note: Campos, Kellner, Reinaldo Jose Bertini, Santucci.) | Late Cretaceous | Brazil | Subsequently argued by Silva Junior et al. (2022) to be a junior synonym of Baurutitan. | Appalachiosaurus Auroraceratops Brachytrachelopan Buitreraptor Changchunsaurus Chebsaurus Dubreuillosaurus Falcarius Hagryphus Jinfengopteryx Lanzhousaurus Puertasaurus Stormbergia Tanycolagreus Tyrannotitan |
| Tyrannotitan | Valid taxon | Novas; de Valais; et al. (Note: Novas, de Valais, Patricia Vickers-Rich, Timothy H. Rich.) | Late Cretaceous | Argentina | | Appalachiosaurus Auroraceratops Brachytrachelopan Buitreraptor Changchunsaurus Chebsaurus Dubreuillosaurus Falcarius Hagryphus Jinfengopteryx Lanzhousaurus Puertasaurus Stormbergia Tanycolagreus Tyrannotitan |
| Xinjiangovenator | Valid taxon | Rauhut; Xu X. | Early Cretaceous | China | | Appalachiosaurus Auroraceratops Brachytrachelopan Buitreraptor Changchunsaurus Chebsaurus Dubreuillosaurus Falcarius Hagryphus Jinfengopteryx Lanzhousaurus Puertasaurus Stormbergia Tanycolagreus Tyrannotitan |

=== Newly named birds ===
| Name | Status | Novelty | Authors | Age | Unit | Location | Notes | Images |
|---|---|---|---|---|---|---|---|---|
| Afrocygnus chauvireae | Valid | Gen. nov. et Sp. nov. | Antoine Louchart Patrick Vignaud Andossa Likius Hassane Taisso Mackaye Michel Brunet | Late Miocene | Anthracotheriid Unit | Chad | An Anatidae, the oldest from Africa. | |
| Aquila nipaloides | Valid | Sp. nov. | Antoine Louchart Claudia Bedetti Marco Pavia | Pleistocene | Corsica and Sardinia | France: Corsica; Italy: Sardinia | An Island Accipitridae. | |
| Chascacocolius cacicirostris | Valid | Sp. nov. | Gerald Mayr | Early Middle Eocene | Messel pit, MP 11 | Germany: Hessen | A Coliiformes, Chascacocoliidae Zelenkov et Dyke, 2008. | |
| Ciconia louisebolesae | Valid | Sp. nov. | Walter E. Boles | Late Oligocene-Early Miocene | Riversleigh | Australia: Queensland | A Ciconiidae. | |
| Crossvallia unienwillia | Valid | Gen. nov. et Sp. nov. | Claudia P. Tambussi Marcelo A. Reguero Sergio A. Marenssi Sergio N. Santillana | Late Paleocene | Cross Valley Formation | Antarctica | A Spheniscidae. | |
| Dalianraptor cuhe | Valid | Gen. nov. et Sp. nov. | Gao Chunling Liu Jinyuan | Early Cretaceous, Early Albian | Jiufotang Formation | China | An Ornithurae Haeckel, 1866. This is the type species of the genus. | |
| Eurofluvioviridavis robustipes | Valid | Gen. nov. et Sp. nov. | Gerald Mayr | Early Eocene | MP 8; Messel pit, MP 11 | UK: England; Germany: Hessen | A Podargiformes, Fluvioviridavidae Mayr, 2005. | |
| Gallinula disneyi | Valid | Sp. nov. | Walter E. Boles | Oligocene-Miocene | Riversleigh | Australia: Queensland | A Rallidae, in 2011 this species becomes the type species of the new genus Australlus Worthy et Boles, 2011. | |
| Gallirallus vekamatolu | Valid | Sp. nov. | Jeremy J. Kirchman David W. Steadman | Holocene | ‘Eua | Tonga | A Rallidae. | |
| Hongshanornis longicresta | Valid | Gen. nov. et Sp. nov. | Zhou Zhonghe Zhang Fucheng | Early Cretaceous | Yixian Formation | China | An Ornithuromorphae Chiappe, Ji, Ji et Norell, 1999, Hongshanornithidae O’Connor, Gao et Chiappe, 2010. This is the type species of the genus. | |
| Limnofregata hasegawai | Valid | Sp. nov. | Storrs L. Olson Hiroshige Matsuoka | Late Early Eocene | Green River Formation | USA (Wyoming) | A Fregatidae, Limnofregatinae Olson, 1977. | |
| Lithoptila abdounensis | Valid | Gen. nov. et Sp. nov. | Estelle Bourdon Baâdi Bouya Mohamed Iarochène | Late Paleocene-Early Eocene | Thanetian | Morocco | A Prophaethontidae Harrison et Walker, 1976. | |
| Oxyura vantetsi | Valid | Sp. nov. | Trevor H. Worthy | Holocene | Lake Poukawa | New Zealand | An Anatidae, extinct since the 16th century. | |
| Parvigrus pohli | Valid | Gen. nov. et Sp. nov. | Gerald Mayr | Early Oligocene | Pichovet, Vachères, Southern France | France | A Parvigruidae Mayr, 2005. | |
| Perugyps diazi | Valid | Gen. nov. et Sp. nov. | Marcelo Stucchi Steven D. Emslie | Late Miocene-Early Pliocene | Pisco Formation | Peru | A Cathartidae. | |
| Protocypselomorphus manfredkelleri | Valid | Gen. nov. et Sp. nov. | Gerald Mayr | Early Middle Eocene | Messel pit, MP 11 | Germany: Hessen | A Cypselomorphae (Sensu Mayr, 2002). | |
| ?Primotrogon pumilio | Valid | Sp. nov. | Gerald Mayr | Early Middle Eocene | Messel pit, MP 11 | Germany: Hessen | A Trogonidae, In 2009 Mayr creates the new genus Masillatrogon for this species and makes ?Primotrogon pumilio its type species. | |
| Pseudoseisuropsis cuelloi | Valid | Gen. nov. et Sp. nov. | Santiago Claramunt Andrès Rinderknecht | Late Pleistocene | Coastal cliffs near Rio de la Plata estuary | Uruguay | A Furnariidae. | |
| Rallus eivissensis | Valid | Sp. nov. | Miquel McMinn M. Palmer Josep A. Alcover | Pleistocene, Holocene | Ibiza | Spain: Ibiza | A Rallidae. | |
| Rhodacanthis forfex | Valid | Sp. nov. | Helen F. James Storrs L. Olson | Holocene | Kauai | USA: Hawaii | A Fringillidae, Carduelinae, Drepanidini. | |
| Rhodacanthis litotes | Valid | Sp. nov. | Helen F. James Storrs L. Olson | Holocene | Oahu | USA: Hawaii | A Fringillidae, Carduelinae, Drepanidini. | |
| Rupelramphastoides knopfi | Valid | Gen. nov. et Sp. nov. | Gerald Mayr | Early Oligocene | Rupelian | Germany: Baden-Württemberg | A Pici (sensu Simpson and Cracraft, 1981), family incertae sedis (confer Ramphastidae Vigors, 1825) | |
| Struthio kakesiensis | Valid | Sp. nov. | Terry Harrison Charles P. Msuya | Pliocene | Lower Laetoli Beds | Tanzania | Known from eggshells | |
| Struthio linxiaensis | Valid | Sp. nov. | Hou Lianhai Zhou Zhonghe Zhang Fu-Cheng Wang Zhao | Late Miocene | Liushu Formation | China | Transferred to, and made the type species of a new genus Orientornis Wang, 2008. | |
| Vegavis iaai | Valid | Gen. nov. et Sp. nov. | Julia A. Clarke Claudia P. Tambussi Jorge L. Noriega Gregory M. Erickson Richard A. Ketcham | Late Cretaceous | Middle to Late Maastrichtian | Antarctica | An ?Anseriformes. This is the type species of the genus. | |

=== Newly named pterosaurs ===
| Name | Status | Authors | Age | Unit | Location | Notes | Images |
|---|---|---|---|---|---|---|---|
| Bakonydraco | Valid | Weishampel; Jianu | Upper Cretaceous | Csehbánya Formation | Hungary | The type species is Bakonydraco galaczi. | |
| Boreopterus | Valid | Lü; Ji | Lower Cretaceous | Yixian Formation | China | The type species is Boreopterus cuiae. | |
| Caulkicephalus | Valid | Steel; Martill; Unwin; Winch | Early Cretaceous | Wessex Formation | England | The type species is Caulkicephalus trimicrodon. | |
| Eoazhdarcho | Valid | Lü; Ji | Early Cretaceous | Jiufotang Formation | China | The type species is Eoazhdarcho liaoxiensis. | |
| Eopteranodon | Valid | Lü; Zhang | Early Cretaceous | Yixian Formation | China | The type species is Eopteranodon lii. | |
| Feilongus | Valid | Wang; Kellner; Zhou; Campos | Early Cretaceous | Yixian Formation | China | The type species is Feilongus youngi. | |
| Huaxiapterus | Synonym | Lü; Yuan | Early Cretaceous | Jiufotang Formation | China | The type species is Huaxiapterus jii. Huaxiapterus is a junior synonym of Sinopterus | |
| Liaoxipterus | Valid | Dong; Lü | Early Cretaceous | Jiufotang Formation | China | The type species is Liaoxipterus brachyognathus. | |
| Nurhachius | Valid | Wang; Kellner; Zhou; Campos | Early Cretaceous | Jiufotang Formation | China | The type species is Nurhachius ignaciobritoi. | |
| Paranurognathus | Synonym | Peters | | | | The type species is Paranurognathus tischlingeri. Paranurognathus is a junior synonym of Anurognathus. | |

== Synapsids ==
=== Non-mammalian ===
| Name | Status | Authors | Age | Unit | Location | Notes | Images |
|---|---|---|---|---|---|---|---|
| Irajatherium | Valid | Martinelli; Bonaparte; Schultz; Rubert | Upper Triassic | Caturrita Formation | Brazil | The type species is Irajatherium hernadezi. | |
| Madysaurus | Valid | Tatarinov | Triassic | Magygen Formation | Kyrgyzstan | The type species is Madysaurus sharovi. | |
| Putillosaurus | Valid | Surkov | Lower Triassic | | Russia | The type species is Putillosaurus sennikovi. | |

=== Mammals ===
==== New taxa ====
| Name | Novelty | Status | Authors | Age | Type locality | Country | Notes | Images |
|---|---|---|---|---|---|---|---|---|
| Amphicticeps dorog | Sp. nov | Valid | Wang et al. | Early Oligocene | Hsanda Gol Formation | Mongolia | An amphicynodontid. | |
| Amphicticeps makhchinus | Sp. nov | Valid | Wang et al. | Early Oligocene | Hsanda Gol Formation | Mongolia | An amphicynodontid. | |
| Indodelphis | Gen. nov. et Sp. nov. | Valid | Bajpai; Kapur; Thewissen; Tiwari; Das | Eocene | Cambay Shale Formation | India | A marsupial. | |

== Footnotes ==
=== Complete author list ===
As science becomes more collaborative, papers with large numbers of authors are becoming more common. To prevent the deformation of the tables, these footnotes list the contributors to papers that erect new genera and have many authors.
