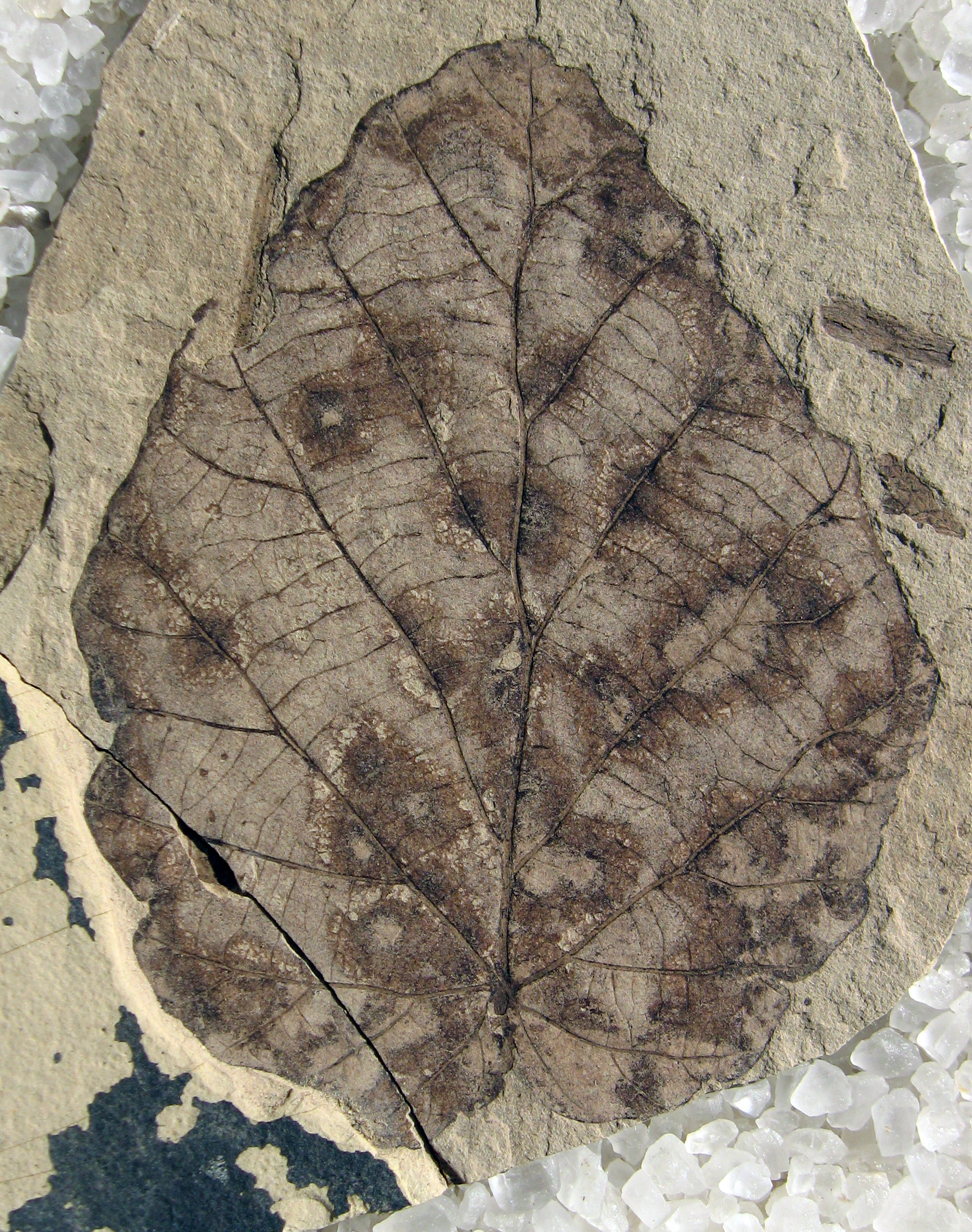
- Fothergilla malloryi specimen

Scientific classification
- Kingdom: Plantae
- Clade: Tracheophytes
- Clade: Angiosperms
- Clade: Eudicots
- Order: Saxifragales
- Family: Hamamelidaceae
- Genus: Fothergilla
- Species: F. malloryi

Binomial name
- Fothergilla malloryi Radtke, Pigg, & Wehr, 2005

= Fothergilla malloryi =

Fothergilla malloryi Temporal range: Ypresian 49.5 Ma

Extinct species of flowering plant

Fothergilla malloryi is an extinct species of flowering plant in the family Hamamelidaceae known from fossil leaves found in the early Eocene Klondike Mountain Formation deposits of northern Washington state. The F. malloryi leaves are the earliest appearance in the fossil record of a member of the witchalder genus Fothergilla, which includes the living species F. gardenii, and F. major, both of which are native to the southeastern United States. The genus also includes three or four other fossil species with two Asian Miocene species, F. viburnifolia from China, F. ryozenensis from Japan along with one Miocene North American species, F. praeolata of Oregon. Fothergilla durhamensis described from Eocene sediments in King County, Washington is considered dubious in placement, and it was transferred to the genus Platimeliphyllum by Huegele et al. (2021).

== History and classification ==
Fothergilla malloryi is represented by a single counterpart compression fossil specimen from the Ypresian aged Klondike Mountain Formation which outcrops in Republic, Ferry County, Washington. The age of the formation is based on Argon–argon dating, which has returned a date of 49.4 ±0.5 million years old. The fossil was recovered from "Boot Hill", University of Washington site UWBM B4131 located within the city limits of Republic.

The holotype specimen for Fothergilla malloryi is numbered UWBM 56625 and currently preserved in the paleobotanical collections of University of Washington in Seattle, Washington. The specimen was studied by paleobotanists Meghan G. Radtke and Kathleen B. Pigg of the School of Life Sciences, Arizona State University and Wesley C. Wehr of the Burke Museum of Natural History and Culture in Seattle. Radtke, Pigg and Wehr published their 2005 type description for F. malloryi in the International Journal of Plant Sciences. The etymology of the specific name malloryi was derived from V. Standish Mallory, University of Washington professor of geology and paleontology, in honor of his contributions to the Tertiary paleontology of Washington State.

== Description ==
The specimen used for the description of F. malloryi is a simple, ovate leaf having a slightly asymmetric base. The overall length of the leaf is 4.4 centimetres (1.7 in) and is 3.5 centimetres (1.4 in) at the widest point near the base. The pinnate secondary veins diverge from the primary vein at an angle of 53° and form a craspedodromous patterning. The leaf margin has large rounded, possibly glandular teeth each with a single major vein. F. malloryi is similar in size range to the extant F gardenii and the Miocene F. viburnifolia, but differs in the structuring of the leaf base. F. malloryi is generally shorter and less elongated then the Miocene species F. ryozenensis while the Oregon species F. praeolata has a notably different overall shape and petiole structure.
