= Fothergilla milleri =

Scientific classification
- Kingdom: Plantae
- Clade: Tracheophytes
- Clade: Angiosperms
- Clade: Eudicots
- Order: Saxifragales
- Family: Hamamelidaceae
- Genus: Fothergilla
- Species: F. milleri

Binomial name
- Fothergilla milleri W.D.Phillips & J.E.Haynes

Species of plant

Fothergilla milleri is a species of flowering plant in the family Hamamelidaceae. It is native to the Southeastern United States.
