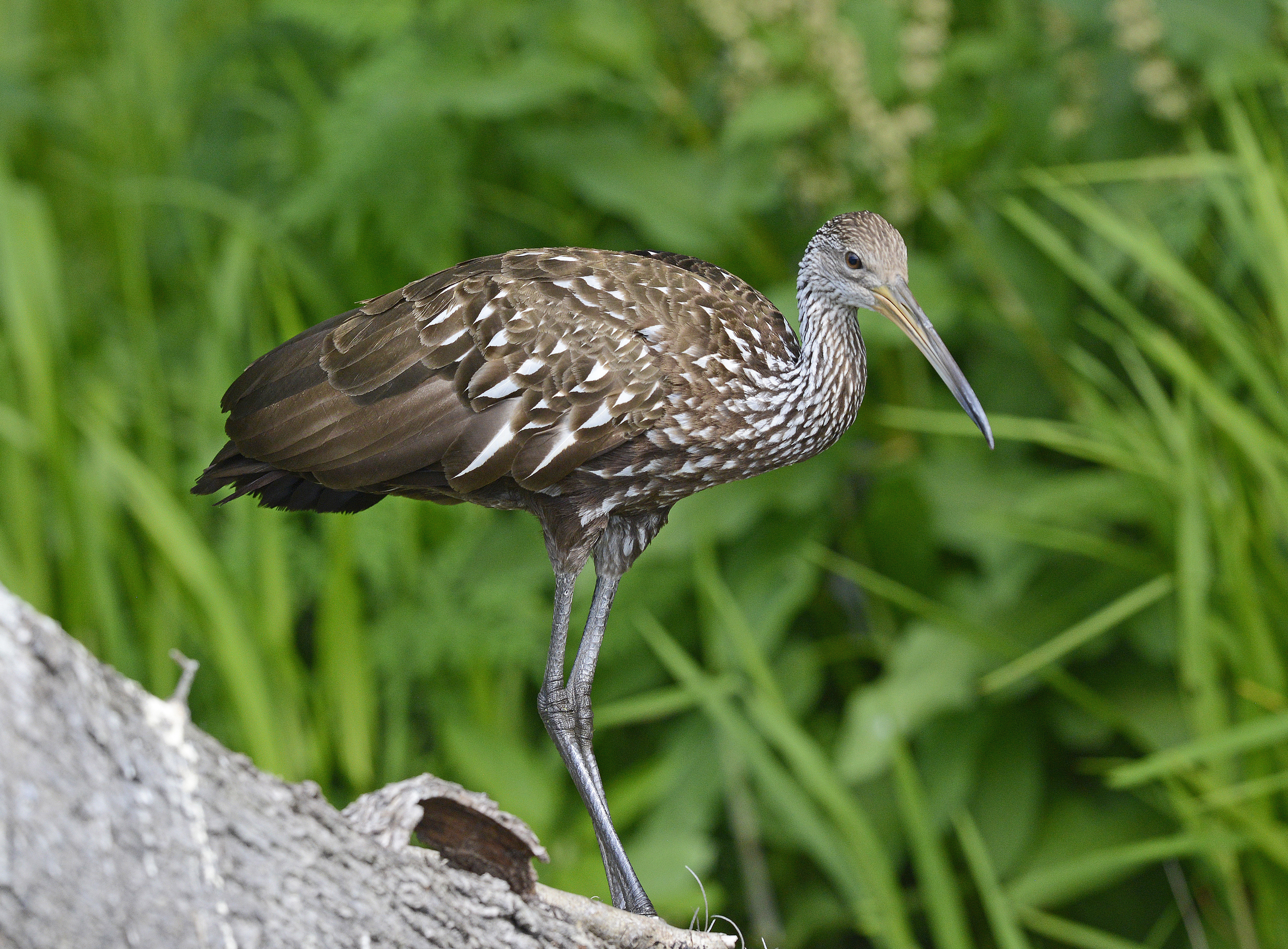
- At St. John's River, Florida

Conservation status
- Least Concern (IUCN 3.1)

- Secure (NatureServe)

Scientific classification
- Kingdom: Animalia
- Phylum: Chordata
- Class: Aves
- Order: Gruiformes
- Family: Aramidae
- Genus: Aramus
- Species: A. guarauna

Binomial name
- Aramus guarauna (Linnaeus, 1766)
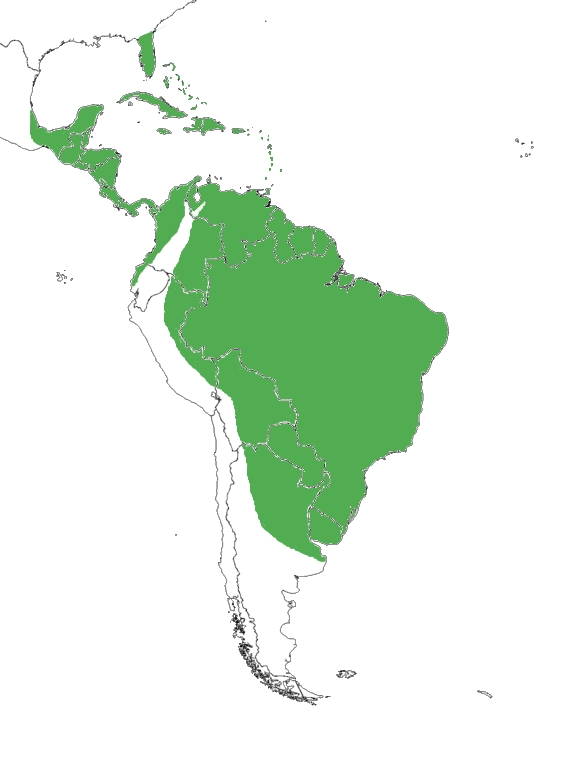
- Range of A. guarauna

Synonyms
- Scolopax guarauna Linnaeus, 1766

= Limpkin =

Species of bird

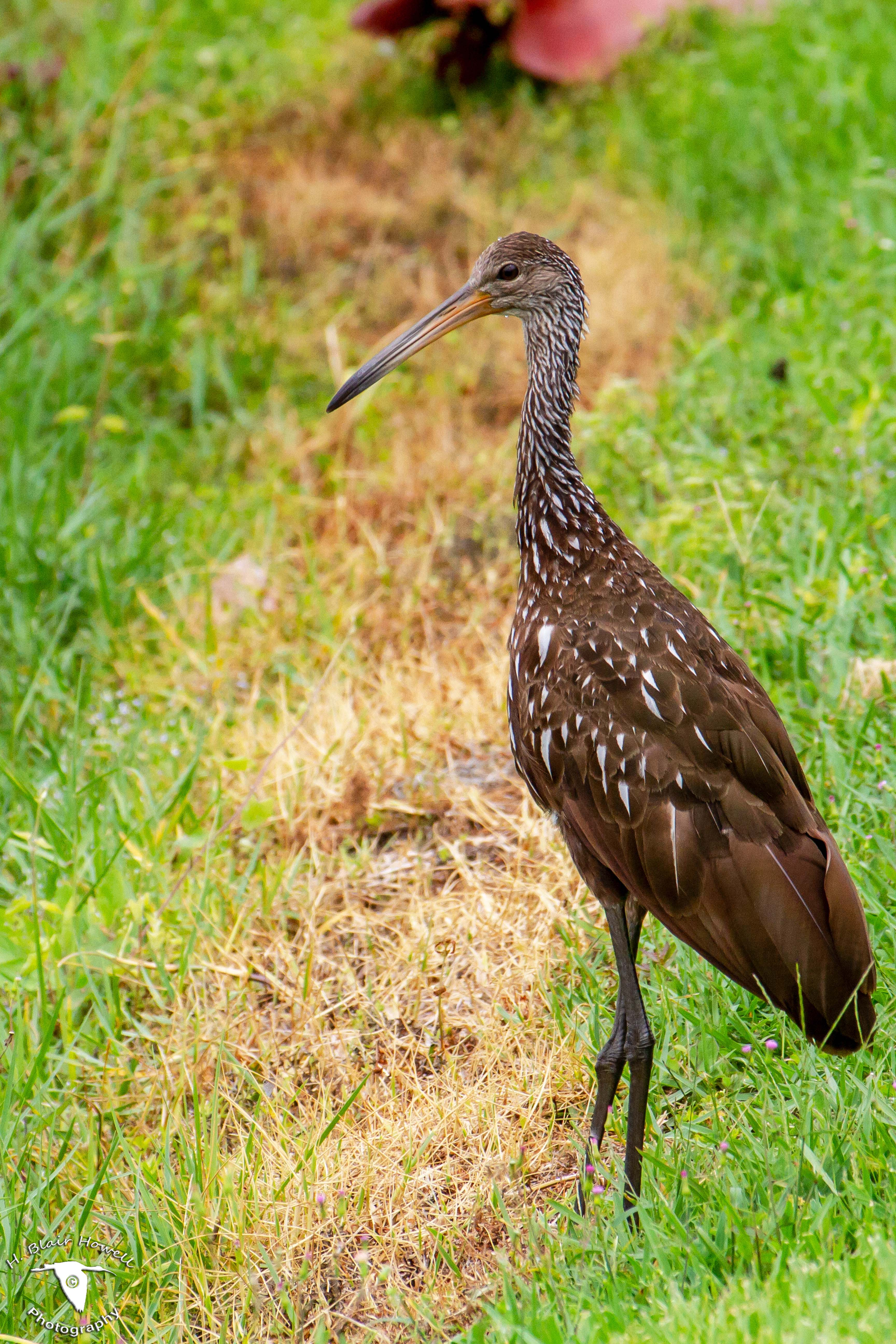
An adult Limpkin walks down the bank of Lake Cecile near Kissimmee, FL

The limpkin (Aramus guarauna) is a large wading bird related to rails and cranes, and the only extant species in the family Aramidae. It is found mostly in wetlands in warm parts of the Americas, from Florida to northern Argentina, but individuals have been reported as far north as Wisconsin, and Southern Ontario. It feeds on molluscs, with the diet dominated by apple snails of the genus Pomacea. Its name derives from its seeming limp when it walks. It has also been called "carrao", "courlan", and "crying bird".

== Taxonomy and systematics ==
The limpkin is placed in the family Aramidae, which is in turn placed within the crane and rail order Gruiformes. The limpkin had been suggested to be close to the ibis and spoonbill family Threskiornithidae, based upon shared bird lice. The Sibley–Ahlquist taxonomy of birds, based upon DNA–DNA hybridization, suggested that the limpkin's closest relatives were the Heliornithidae finfoots, and Sibley and Monroe even placed the species in that family in 1990. More recent studies have found little support for this relationship. More recent DNA studies have confirmed a close relationship with particularly the cranes, with the limpkin remaining as a family close to the cranes, and the two being sister taxa to the trumpeters.

Although the limpkin is the only extant species in the family today, several fossils of extinct Aramidae are known from across the Americas. The earliest known species, Aramus paludigrus, is dated to the middle Miocene of Colombia. An Oligocene fossil from Europe, Parvigrus pohli (family Parvigruidae), has been described as a mosaic of the features shared by the limpkins and the cranes. It shares many morphological features with the cranes and limpkins, but also was much smaller than either group, and was more rail-like in its proportions. In the paper describing the fossil, Gerald Mayr suggested that it was similar to the stem species of the grues (the cranes and limpkins), and that the limpkins evolved especially long bills as a result of the specialisation to feeding on snails. In contrast, the cranes evolved into long-legged forms to walk and probe on open grasslands.

=== Subspecies ===
Between 1856 and 1934, the limpkin was treated as two species, one in South America (Aramus guarauna) and the other found in Central America, the Caribbean, and Florida (Aramus pictus). Today, it is treated as a single species with four subspecies. Along with the nominate subspecies A. g. guarauna, A. g. dolosus, A. g. elucus (both J. L. Peters, 1925), and A. g. pictus (F. A. A. Meyer, 1794) are recognized. The difference between the subspecies are related to slight differences in size and plumage.

- Aramus guarauna guarauna - South America (except the arid west coast, the Andes and extreme south)
- Aramus guarauna pictus - Florida, Georgia, The Bahamas, Cuba and Jamaica
- Aramus guarauna elucus - Hispaniola and (formerly) Puerto Rico
- Aramus guarauna dolosus - Southwestern Mexico to Panama

== Description ==
The limpkin is a moderately large bird, 64–73 cm (25–29 in) long, with a wingspan of 101–107 cm (40–42 in). Body mass ranges from 900 to 1,300 g (2.0 to 2.9 lb), averaging 1,080 g (2.38 lb). The males are slightly larger than the females in size, but no difference in plumage is seen. Its plumage is drab—dark brown with an olive luster above. The feathers of the head, neck, wing coverts, and much of the back and underparts (except the rear) are marked with white, making the body look streaked and the head and neck light gray. It has long, dark-gray legs and a long neck. Its bill is long, heavy, and downcurved, yellowish bill with a darker tip. The bill is slightly open near but not at the end to give it a tweezers-like action in removing snails from their shells, and in many individuals the tip curves slightly to the right, like the apple snails' shells. The white markings are slightly less conspicuous in first-year birds. Its wings are broad and rounded and its tail is short. It is often confused with the immature American white ibis.

This bird is easier to hear than see. Its common vocalization is a loud wild wail or scream with some rattling quality, represented as "kwEEEeeer or klAAAar." This call is most often given at night and at dawn and dusk. Other calls include "wooden clicking", clucks, and in alarm, a "piercing bihk, bihk...".

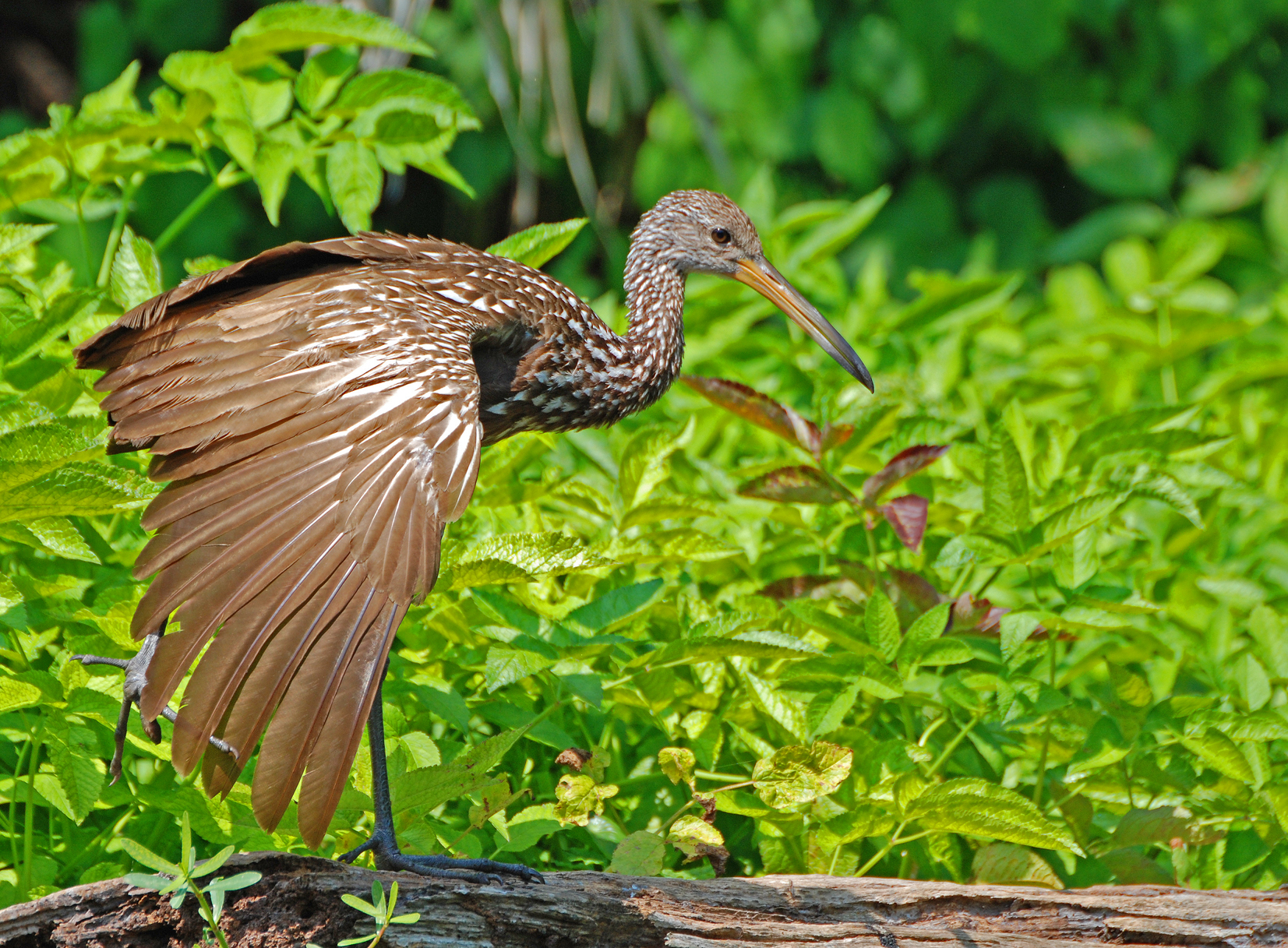
Limpkin performing a wing-stretch

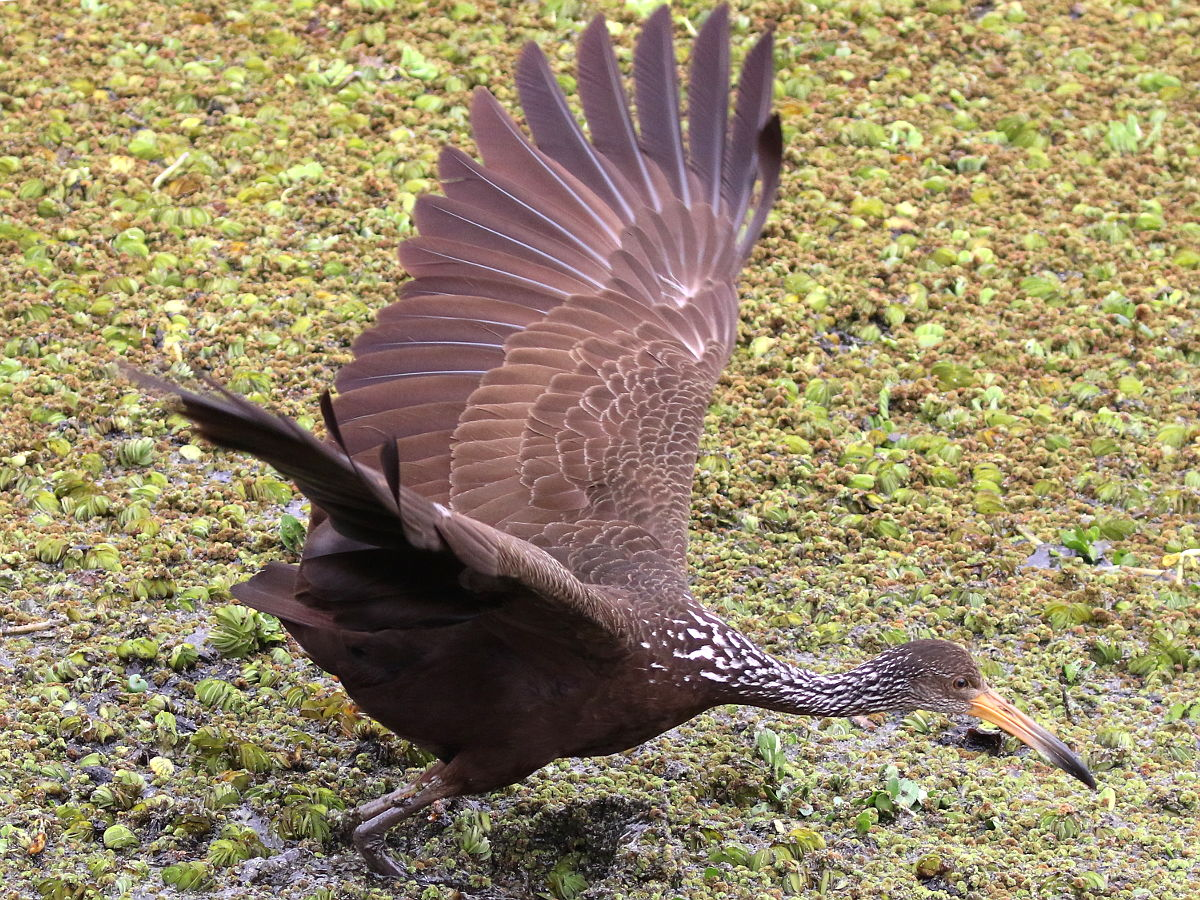
Taking off

== Distribution and habitat ==
The limpkin occurs from peninsular Florida (and the Okefenokee Swamp in southern Georgia) and southern Mexico through the Caribbean and Central America to northern Argentina. In South America, it occurs widely east of the Andes; west of them its range extends only to the Equator.

It inhabits freshwater marshes and swamps, often with tall reeds, as well as mangroves. In the Caribbean, it also inhabits dry brushland. In Mexico and northern Central America, it occurs at altitudes up to 1,500 m (4,900 ft). In Florida, the distribution of apple snails is the best predictor of where limpkins can be found.

The limpkin undertakes some localized migrations, although the extent of these is not fully understood. In some parts in the northern part of the range, females (and a few males) leave the breeding areas at the end of summer, returning at the end of winter. In Brazil, birds breeding in some seasonal marshes leave during the dry season and return again with the rains. Birds may also migrate between Florida and Cuba, as several limpkins have been reported on the Florida Keys and Dry Tortugas, but these records may also represent vagrants or postbreeding dispersal. One study in Florida using wing tags found limpkins dispersed up to 325 km (202 mi) away from the breeding site. This tendency may explain vagrant limpkins seen in other parts of the United States and at sea near the Bahamas. Reports of limpkins across the United States have been increasing since 2014 and have been accelerating since 2022, including the establishment of new populations outside of Florida and southern Georgia. The reasons for this are unclear, although climate change is suggested as a likely cause.

== Behavior and ecology ==
Limpkins are active during the day, but also forage at night. Where they are not persecuted, they are also very tame and approachable. Even so, they are usually found near cover. They are not aggressive for the most part, being unconcerned by other species and rarely fighting with members of their own species.

Because of their long toes, they can stand on floating water plants. They also swim well, both as adults or as newly hatched chicks, but they seldom do so. They fly strongly, the neck projecting forward and the legs backward, the wings beating shallowly and stiffly, with a jerky upstroke, above the horizontal most of the time.

=== Feeding ===
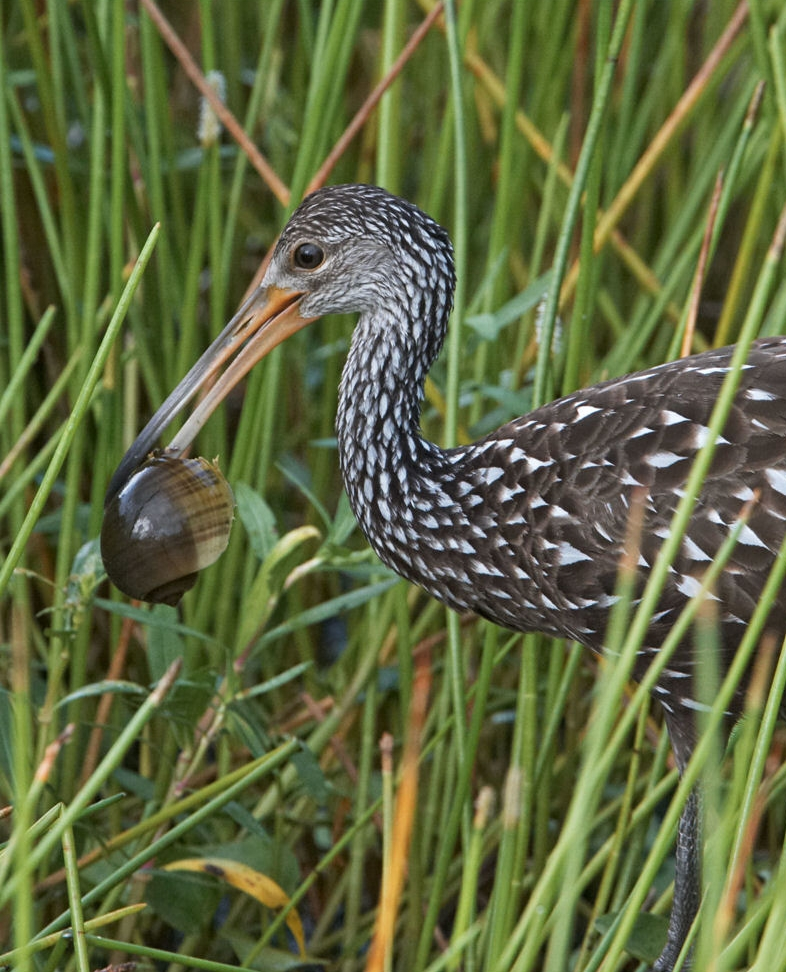
Limpkin with an apple snail (Pomacea)

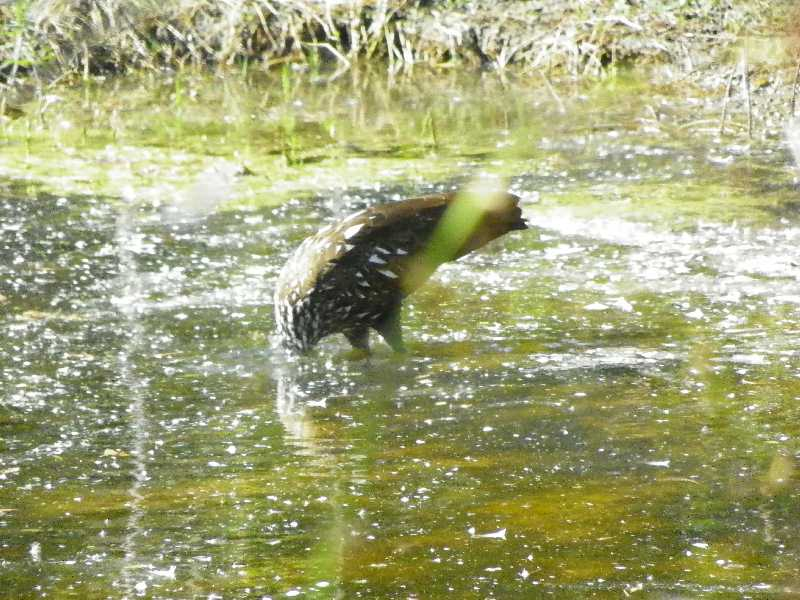
Limpkin searching underwater for food

Limpkins forage primarily in shallow water and on floating vegetation such as water hyacinth and water lettuce. When wading, they seldom go deeper than having half the body underwater, and never are submerged up to the back. They walk slowly with a gait described as "slightly undulating" and "giving the impression of lameness or limping", "high-stepping", or "strolling", looking for food if the water is clear or probing with the bill. They do not associate with other birds in mixed-species feeding flocks, as do some other wading birds, but may forage in small groups with others of their species.

The diet of the limpkin is dominated by apple snails (Ampullariidae) of the genus Pomacea. The availability of this one mollusk has a significant effect on the local distribution of the limpkin. Freshwater mussels, including Anodonta cowperiana, Villosa vibex, Elliptio strigosus, E. jayensis, and Uniomerus obesus, as well as other kinds of snails, are a secondary food sources. Less important prey items are insects, frogs, lizards, crustaceans (such as crayfish) and worms, as well as seeds. These prey items may be important in periods of drought or flooding when birds may be pushed into less than optimal foraging areas. In one site in Florida, moon snails and mussels were the most important prey items. Two studies, both in Florida, have looked at the percentage composition of the diet of limpkins. One, looking at stomach contents, found 70% Pomacea apple snails, 3% Campeloma, and 27% unidentified mollusc, probably Pomacea.

When a limpkin finds an apple snail, it carries it to land or very shallow water and places it in mud, the opening facing up. It deftly removes the operculum or "lid" and extracts the snail, seldom breaking the shell. The extraction takes 10 to 20 seconds. The orange-yellow yolk gland of female snails is usually shaken loose and not eaten. It often leaves piles of empty shells at favored spots.

=== Reproduction and breeding ===
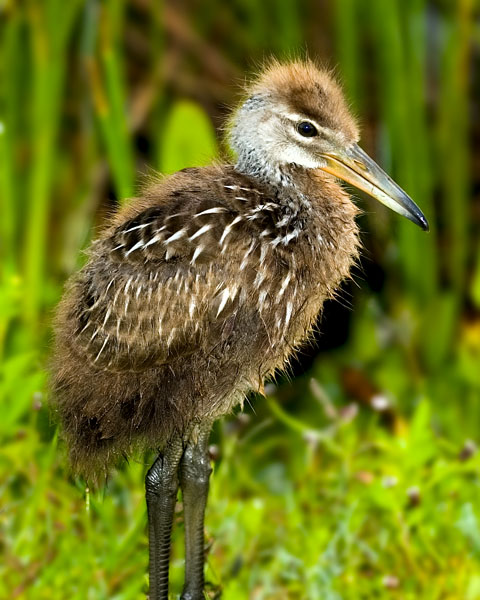
Juvenile limpkin

Males have exclusive territories, which can vary in size from 0.15 to 4.0 ha (0.37 to 9.88 acres). In large, uniform swamps, nesting territories can often be clumped together, in the form of large colonies. These are vigorously defended, with males flying to the territory edges to challenge intruders and passing limpkins being chased out of the territory. Territorial displays between males at boundaries include ritualized charging and wing-flapping. Females may also participate in territorial defense, but usually only against other females or juveniles. Territories may be maintained year-round or abandoned temporarily during the nonbreeding season, usually due to lack of food.

Limpkins may be either monogamous, with females joining a male's territory, or serially polyandrous, with two or more females joining a male. With the monogamous pairs, banding studies have shown that a small number of pairs reform the following year (four out of 18 pairs).

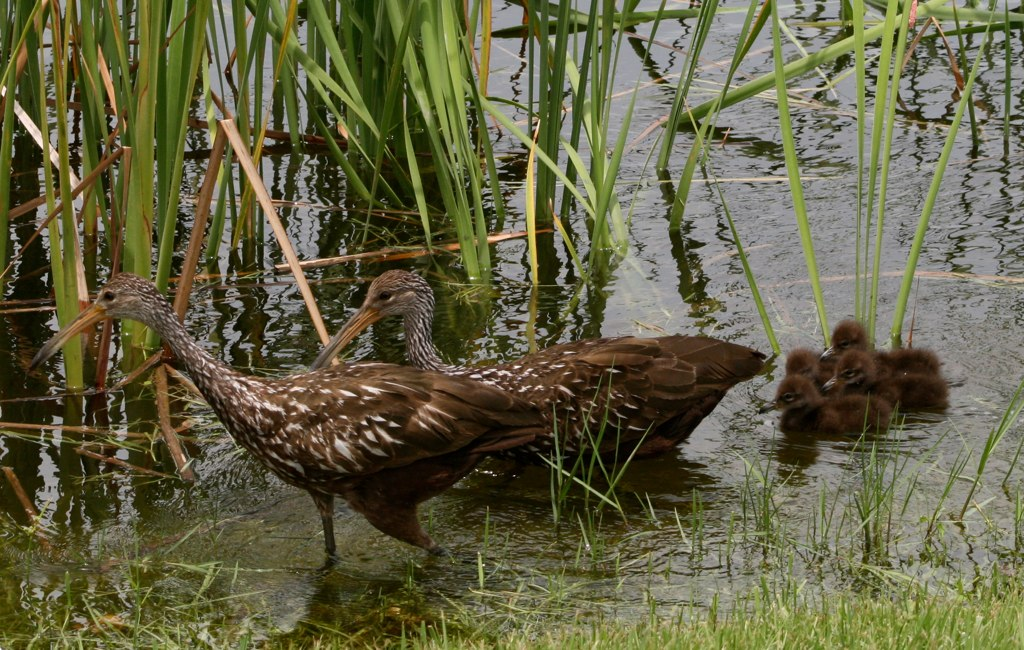
Limpkin chicks with parents

Nests may be built in a wide variety of places – on the ground, in dense floating vegetation, in bushes, or at any height in trees. They are bulky structures of rushes, sticks, or other materials. Nest building is undertaken by the male initially, which constructs the nest in his territory prior to pair-bond formation. Unpaired females visit a number of territories before settling on a male with which to breed. Males may initially challenge and fight off prospective mates, and may not accept first-year females as mates. Pair-bond formation may take a few weeks. Courtship feeding is part of the bonding process, where males catch and process a snail and then feed it to the female.

The clutch consists of three to eight eggs, with five to seven being typical and averaging 5.5, which measure 6.0 cm × 4.4 cm (2.4 in × 1.7 in). The egg color is highly variable. Their background color ranges from gray-white through buff to deep olive, and they are marked with light-brown and sometimes purplish-gray blotches and speckles. The eggs are laid daily until the clutch is complete, and incubation is usually delayed until the clutch is completed. Both parents incubate the eggs during the day, but only the female incubates at night. The shift length is variable, but the male incubates for longer during the day. The male remains territorial during incubation, and leaves the clutch to chase off intruders; if this happens, the female returns quickly to the eggs. The incubation period is about 27 days, and all the eggs hatch within 24 hours of each other.

The young hatch covered with down, capable of walking, running, and swimming. They follow their parents to a platform of aquatic vegetation, where they are brooded. They are fed by both parents; they reach adult size at 7 weeks and leave their parents at about 16 weeks.

=== Ecology ===
Limpkins are reported to be attacked and eaten by American alligators. Also, adults with serious foot and leg injuries have been reported, suggesting they may have been attacked by turtles while standing on floating vegetation. Their nests are apparently preyed upon by snakes, raccoons, crows, and muskrats. Foraging adults may be victims of kleptoparasitism by snail kites in times of drought, and the attempted theft of apple snails caught by limpkins has also been observed in boat-tailed grackles.

Limpkins in Florida were examined for parasites, which included trematodes, nematodes, and biting lice. Two biting lice species were found, Laemobothrion cubense and Rallicola funebris. The trematode Prionosoma serratum was found in the intestines of some birds; this species may enter the bird after first infecting apple snails (this has been shown to be the route of infection for a closely related trematode to infect snail kites). Nematodes Amidostomum acutum and Strongyloides spp. are also ingested and live in the gut.

== Relationship with humans ==
Many of the limpkin's names across its range are onomatopoeic and reflect the bird's call; for example, carau in Argentina, carrao in Venezuela, guareáo in Cuba and carão in Brazil. The species also has a range of common names that refer to its call, for example lamenting bird, or to its supposed gait, crippled bird. The limpkin does not feature much in folklore, although in the Amazon people believe that when the limpkin starts to call, the river will not rise any more. Its call has been used for jungle sound effects in Tarzan films and for the hippogriff in the film Harry Potter and the Prisoner of Azkaban.
