= Teixeiraea =

Teixeiraea Temporal range: early Cretaceous

Scientific classification
- Kingdom: Plantae
- (unranked): Angiosperms
- (unranked): Eudicots
- Order: Ranunculales
- Genus: Teixeiraea M. von Balthazar et al. 2005

Species
- T. lusitanica M. von Balthazar et al. 2005

Extinct genus of eudicot plants

Teixeiraea is an extinct genus of eudicot plants which was found in Vale de Agua 320, Portugal during the Cretaceous period. It was first named by M. von Balthazar, K. Raunsgaard Pedersen and E. M. Friis in 2005 and the type species is Teixeiraea lusitanica.
