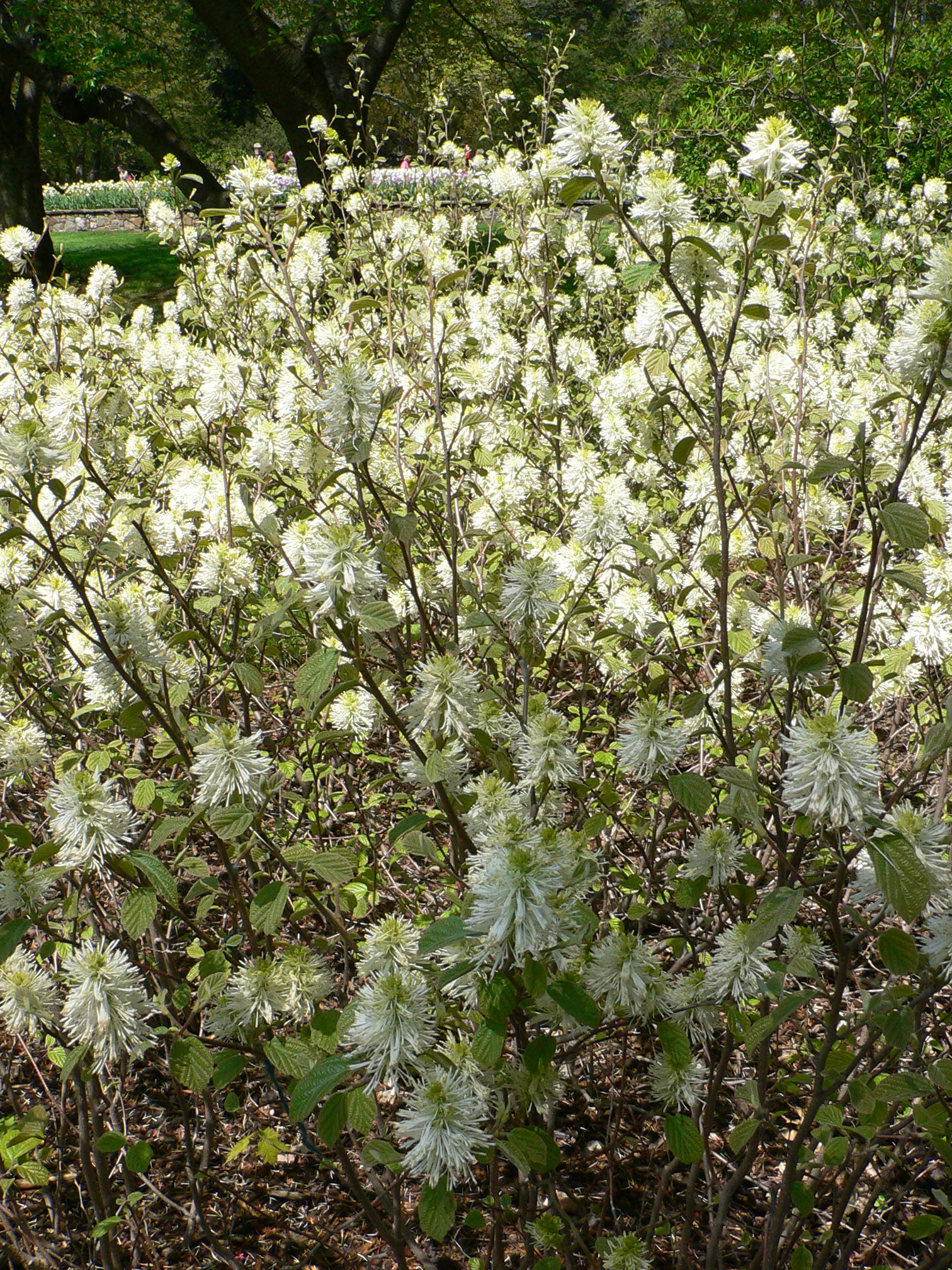
- Fothergilla gardenii

Scientific classification
- Kingdom: Plantae
- Clade: Tracheophytes
- Clade: Angiosperms
- Clade: Eudicots
- Order: Saxifragales
- Family: Hamamelidaceae
- Subfamily: Hamamelidoideae
- Tribe: Fothergilleae
- Genus: Fothergilla; Murr.

Species
- Fothergilla gardenii L.; †Fothergilla malloryi; Fothergilla latifolia J.F.Mill.; Fothergilla milleri W.D.Phillips & J.E.Haynes; Fothergilla parvifolia Kearney

Synonyms
- Anamelis Garden

= Fothergilla =

Genus of flowering plants

Fothergilla (witch alder) is a genus of two to four species of flowering plants in the family Hamamelidaceae, native to woodland and swamps of the southeastern United States.

They are low-growing deciduous shrubs growing to 1–3 m (3–10 ft) tall with downy twigs. The brush-like flowers are produced before the leaves in spring on terminal spikes; they do not have any petals, but a conspicuous cluster of white stamens 2–3 cm long. The leaves are alternate, broad ovoid, 4–10 cm long and 3–8 cm broad, with a coarsely toothed margin; they are noted for their brilliant orange or red fall colors.

== Species ==
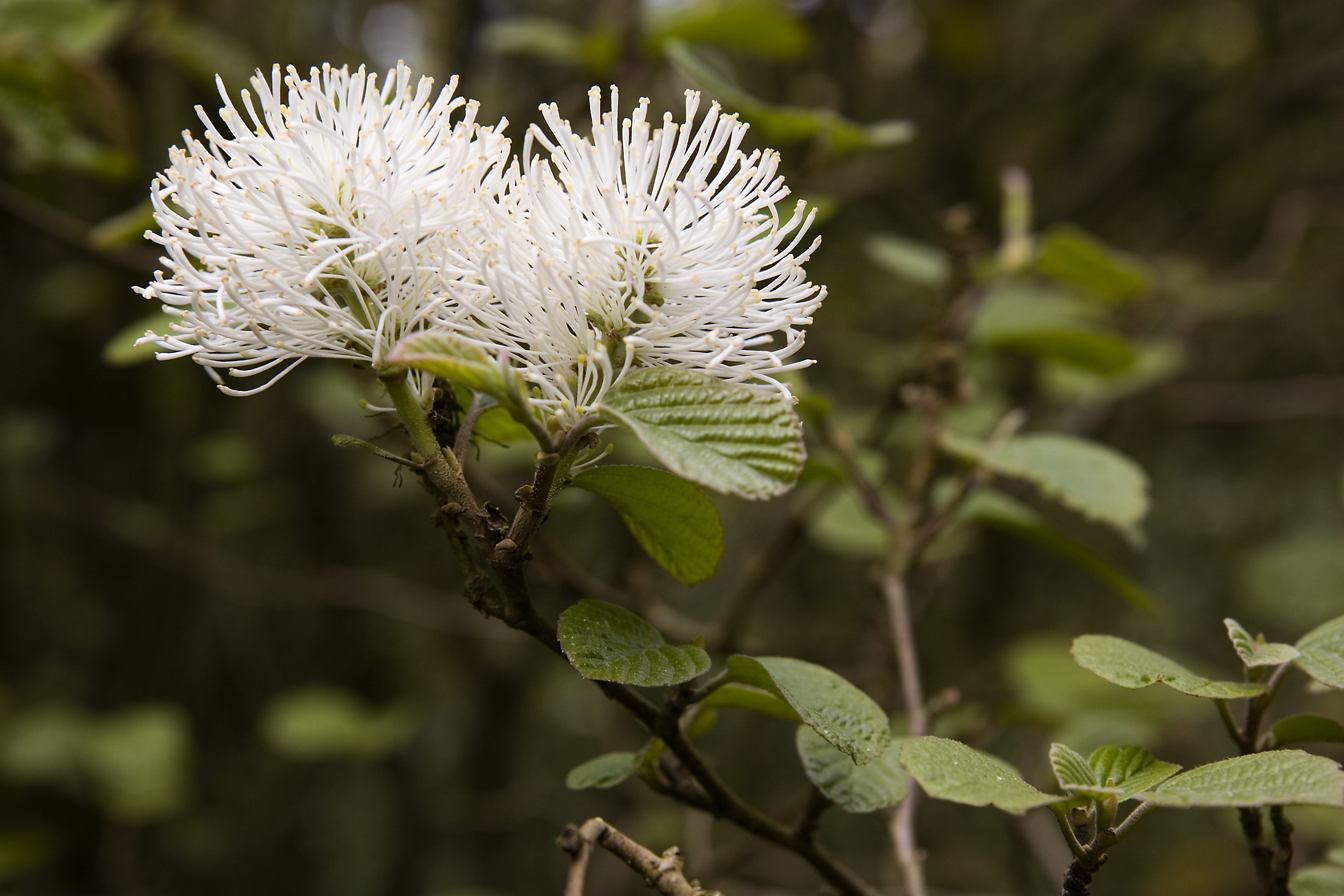
Flowers of F. major

Four species are accepted.

- Fothergilla gardenii L. – dwarf witch alder
- †Fothergilla malloryi (Extinct, Ypresian, Klondike Mountain Formation)
- Fothergilla latifolia J.F.Mill. (synonyms F. major (Sims) Sweet and F. monticola Ashe) – large witch alder
- Fothergilla milleri W.D.Phillips & J.E.Haynes
- Fothergilla parvifolia Kearney

== Etymology ==
The genus was named in honor of the English physician and plant collector Dr. John Fothergill (1712-1780) of Stratford, Essex, who was known for introducing American plants to Britain.

== Cultivation and uses ==
Fothergillas are grown as ornamental plants for their spring flowers and fall foliage color. They are slow-growing, rarely exceeding 1–2 m tall in cultivation. The hybrid cultivar Fothergilla × intermedia 'Mount Airy' has gained the Royal Horticultural Society's Award of Garden Merit.

Fothergilla 'Mount Airy'

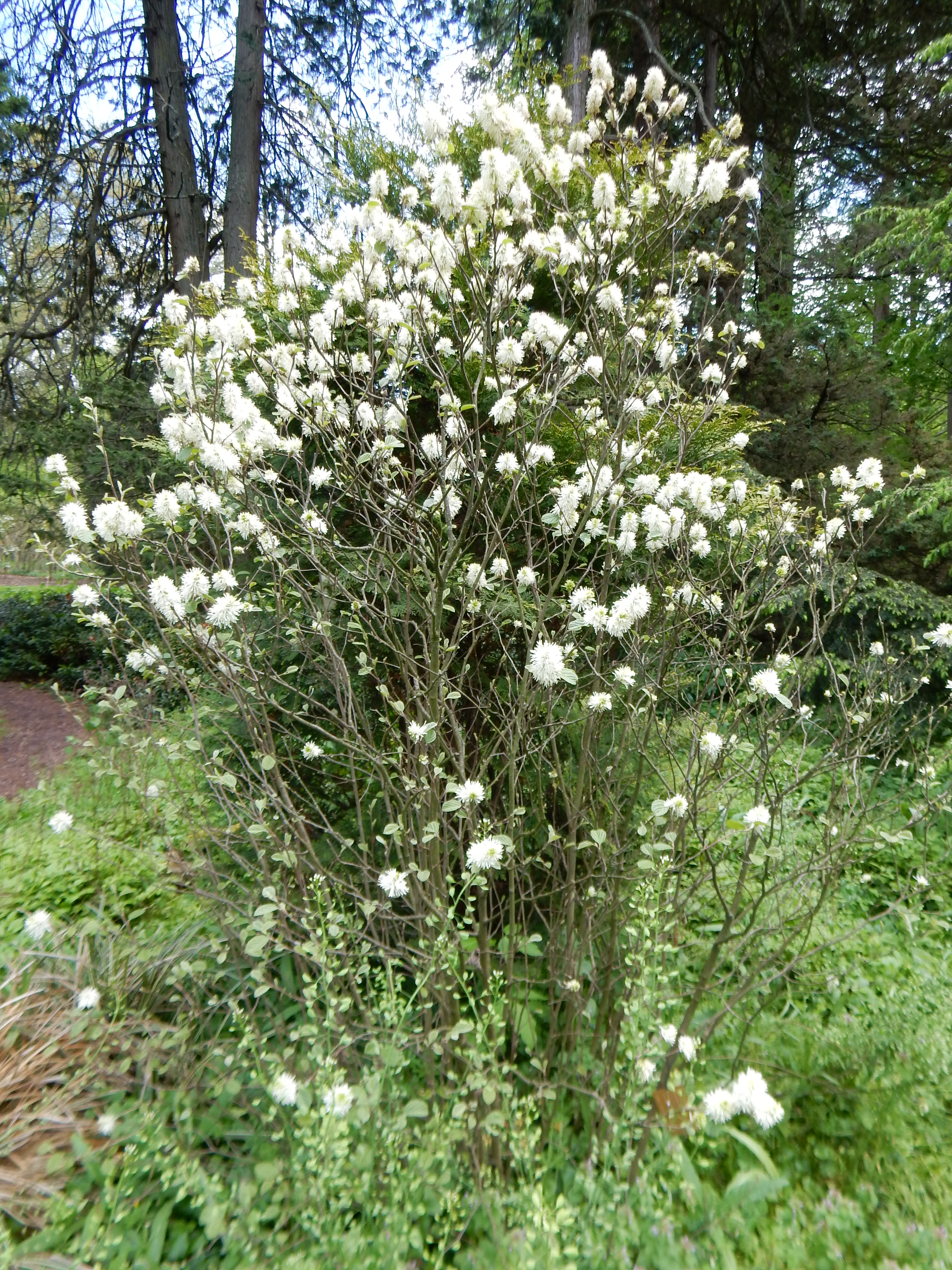

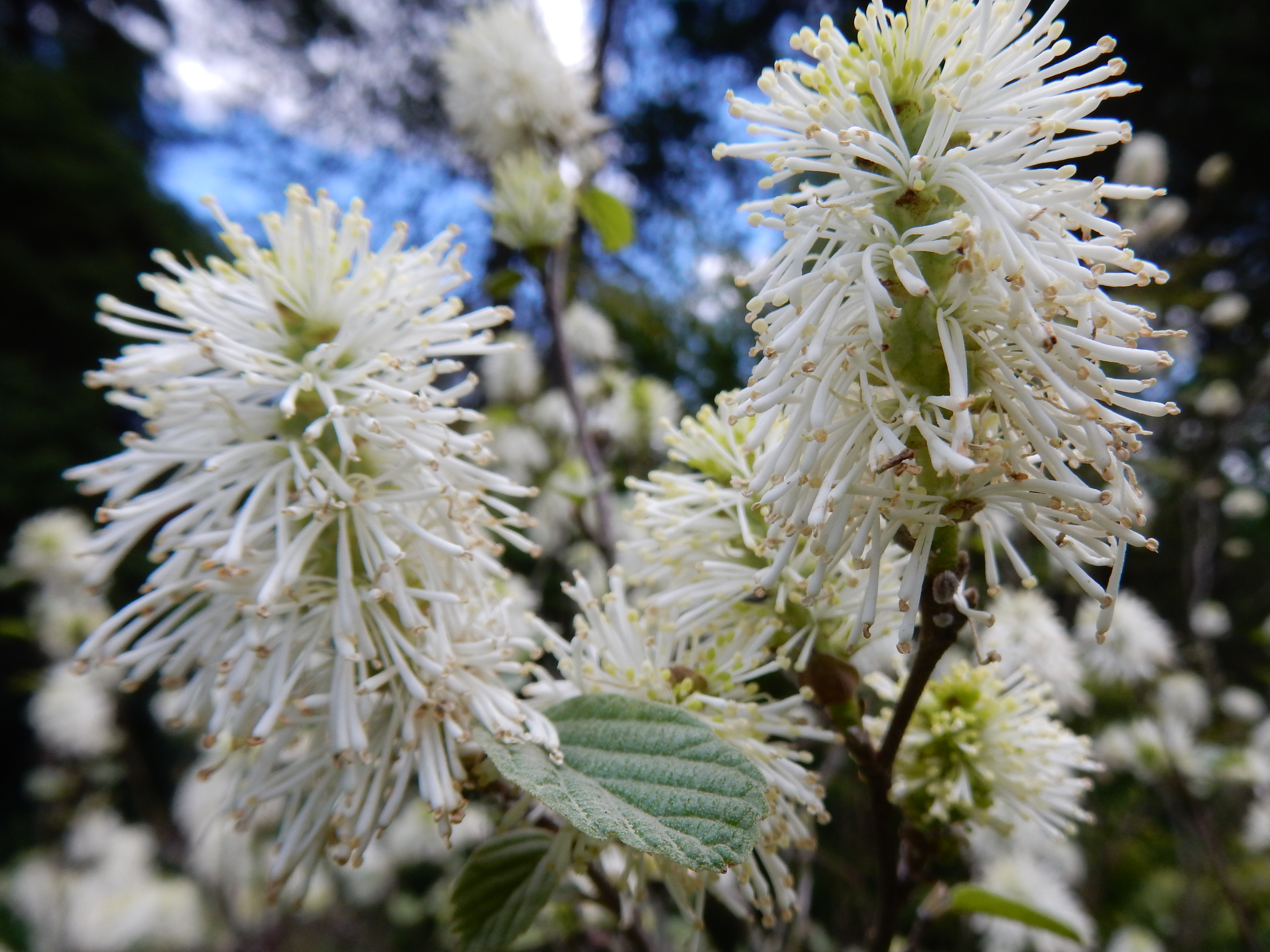

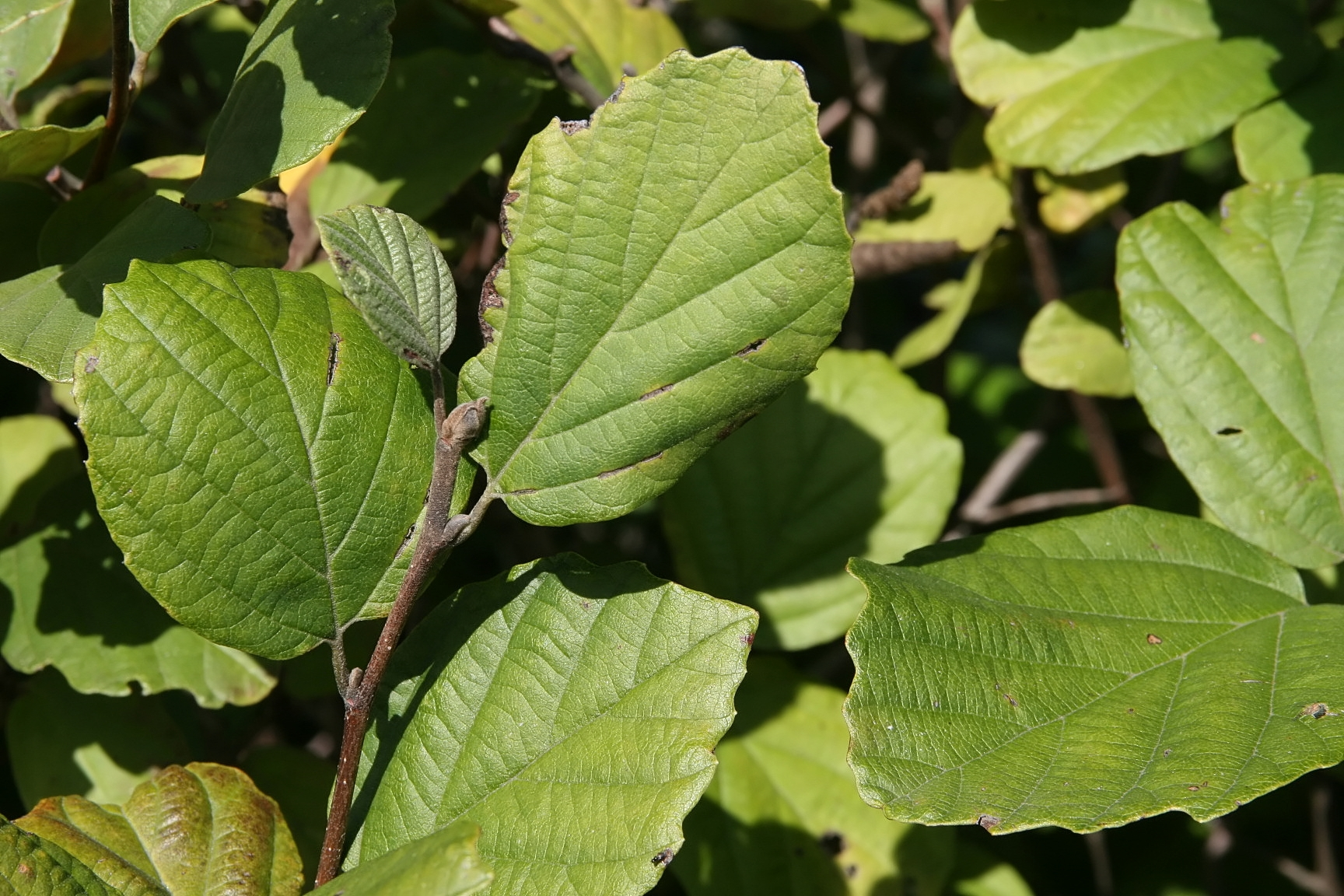
