= Carau =

Argentine myth

The carau is a myth, commonly known in northeastern Argentine fables.

== Myth ==
The carau is further referred to an old and sorrowful legend from the northeast of Argentina, fable about a young man whose mother suffers from a deadly disease. He is sent to go for medicine. Her son, an innocent young boy, while on the way to the village, heard an accordion in the distance. He followed its sound, ran into a concurrence he forgot his mission.

He began dancing with the prettiest girl of the zone. Later, amidst dancing, a carau's comrade hindered him about a notice, telling: "I beg your pardon Carau, my friend, my condolences... your mother just died..."

Carau responded "It doesn't matter my friend, mum already died, I'll have time to cry later..."

Later in the night when the dawn was coming, he asked the lady to go with her to her house, and she coldly responded: "My house is far away from here, and I won't be visited by one who doesn't care for his own mother…"

Afterwards, saying goodbye, with his heart utterly broke, moving to home imbibed in tears, the young carau was transformed into a bird and tupa (god) condemned him to bear mourning black feathers and cry forever, just like the bird lament: caráu.

== Song ==
This legend was embedded in a song which was written by Emilio Chamorro, a regional folk writer, and had commonly been sung in chamamé style; it gathered widespread through greater northeastern folk singers as Zitto Zegovia and Mario Boffil in their versions of "El Caráu".

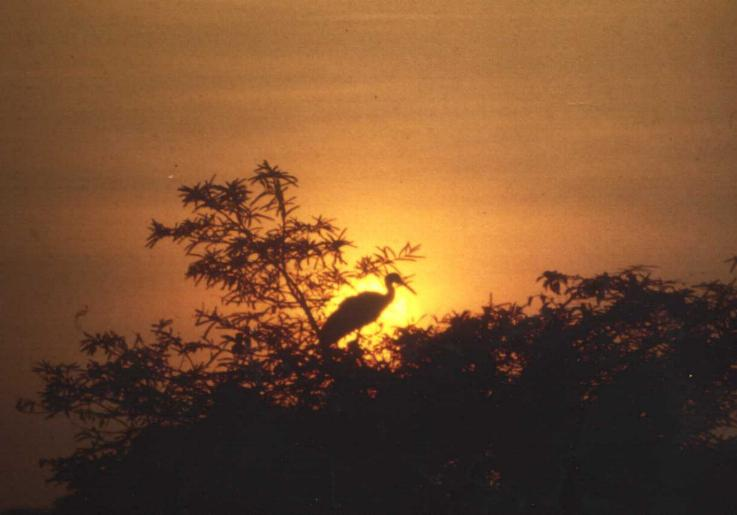
The carau, singing above a tree, or alike the fable, crying and waiting to recover his soul and get the pardon of tupa.

== See also ==
- Argentine culture
- Limpkin
