= Parvigrus =

Parvigrus Temporal range: Lower Oligocene

Scientific classification
- Kingdom: Animalia
- Phylum: Chordata
- Class: Aves
- Order: Gruiformes
- Family: †Parvigruidae
- Genus: †Parvigrus; Mayr, 2005
- Species: †P. pohli

Binomial name
- †Parvigrus pohli Mayr, 2005

Extinct genus of birds

Parvigrus is an extinct bird genus, with the single species Parvigrus pohli. It is considered a family, the Parvigruidae. The remains of Parvigrus pohli have been described from fossils found in Vachères in France, from rocks from the Lower Oligocene. The name Parvigrus is derived from the Latin parvus for small and grus for crane, the specific epithet refers to Burkhard Pohl who obtained the specimen for the Wyoming Dinosaur Center. Parvigrus pohli was a chicken sized relative of the cranes and the limpkin.
