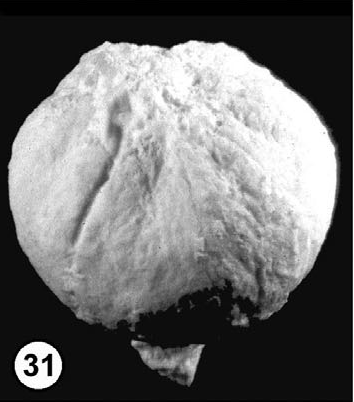
- Shirleya grahamae fruit

Scientific classification
- Kingdom: Plantae
- Clade: Tracheophytes
- Clade: Angiosperms
- Clade: Eudicots
- Clade: Rosids
- Order: Myrtales
- Family: Lythraceae
- Genus: †Shirleya; Pigg & DeVore
- Species: †S. grahamae

Binomial name
- †Shirleya grahamae Pigg & DeVore

= Shirleya =

Shirleya Temporal range: Middle Miocene

Extinct genus of plants

Shirleya is an extinct genus in the crape myrtle family, Lythraceae, which contains a single species, Shirleya grahamae. The genus and species are known from Middle Miocene fossils found in Central Washington.

== History and classification ==
The species was first described from specimens of silicified fruits preserved in chert of the "Yakima Canyon Flora". The chert was recovered from the type locality "Hi hole" site, one of the "county line hole" fossil localities of the "Yakima Canyon Flora" located north of Interstate 82 in Yakima County, Washington. The "Hi hole" site works strata was formerly thought to be part of the Museum Flow Package within the interbeds of the Sentinel Bluffs Unit of the central Columbia Plateau N_{2} Grande Ronde Basalt, Columbia River Basalt Group. The Museum Flow Package interbeds are dated to the middle Miocene and are approximately 15.6 million years old. Later re-evaluation of the "Hi hole" site indicated that the site is included into a basalt flow, having deposited into pockets and crevasses on the surface of the flow, rather than being part of the interbedded Museum flow package. The evaluation suggested the basalt is part of the Wanapum Basalt and that the fossils are possibly a little younger than formerly reported. Dating reported in 2007 of a related site near Ellensburg, Washington confirmed that the deposits worked are pockets within the basalt flows, and the 15.6 million year old date was accurate.

At the time of study, the holotype fruit, specimen UWBM 55134, and a series of paratype specimens were preserved in the Burke Museum of Natural History and Culture while additional paratypes, and examined fossils that were not part of the type series, were part of the paleobotanical collections at Arizona State University. The specimens represent a range of preservation conditions, ranging from exposed on weathered surfaces of the chert, totally weathered out of the chert, and as fully enclosed fruits in chert. A total of over 24 specimens in or preserved by chert were studied by paleobotanists Kathleen Pigg and Melanie DeVore, with their 2005 type description being published in the American Journal of Botany. Pigg and DeVore coined the genus name Shirleya and the specific epithet grahamae as a matronym honoring Shirley A. Graham, then of the Missouri Botanical Garden in St. Louis, Missouri for her work and "significant contributions" to the family Lythraceae.

Based on similarities to the living genus Lagerstroemia, Pigg and DeVore placed Shirleya into Lythraceae, with no indication of a subfamily assignment. While Shirleya has a number of features that are similar to Lagerstroemia, there are also several distinct features. The fruits have a thicker pericarp that is similar to the genera Duabanga and Sonneratia which have berry-like fruits, but Shirleya fruits were dehiscent, unlike the berry-like fruits, as indicated by several isolated silicified fruit valves. The seeds in Shirleya fruits develop near the tops of the fruit gynoecium with wings extending down towards the gynoecium base, while in Lagerstroemia the seeds develop in reverse position, with the wing extending from the seed towards the top of the gynoecium. These differences lead Pigg and DeVore to place the fossils in a new genus.

== Description ==
The fruits of Shirleya range up to 10.0 mm (0.39 in) long and have a diameter of up to 12.5 mm (0.49 in) giving a subglobose outline. The central axis of the fruit is mostly a parenchymatous pith that forms a star shape. The fruits have between five and seven wedge shaped locules or minute chambers surrounding the central axis and narrow dehiscence slits which split on maturity, breaking the fruit into sections of two locule halves and the joining septum. Each locule contains between five and seven mature seeds plus occasional smaller seeds. The seeds are tightly packed into each locule and hang down from the apical area of the locule with wings curving out from the axis. The seeds are up to 4.6 mm (0.18 in) in length with a tail or hook on both the proximal and distal ends, and a wing that make up approximately two-thirds of the seed length. The seed wings each have a central bilobed parenchymatous mass that surrounds a central cavity.
