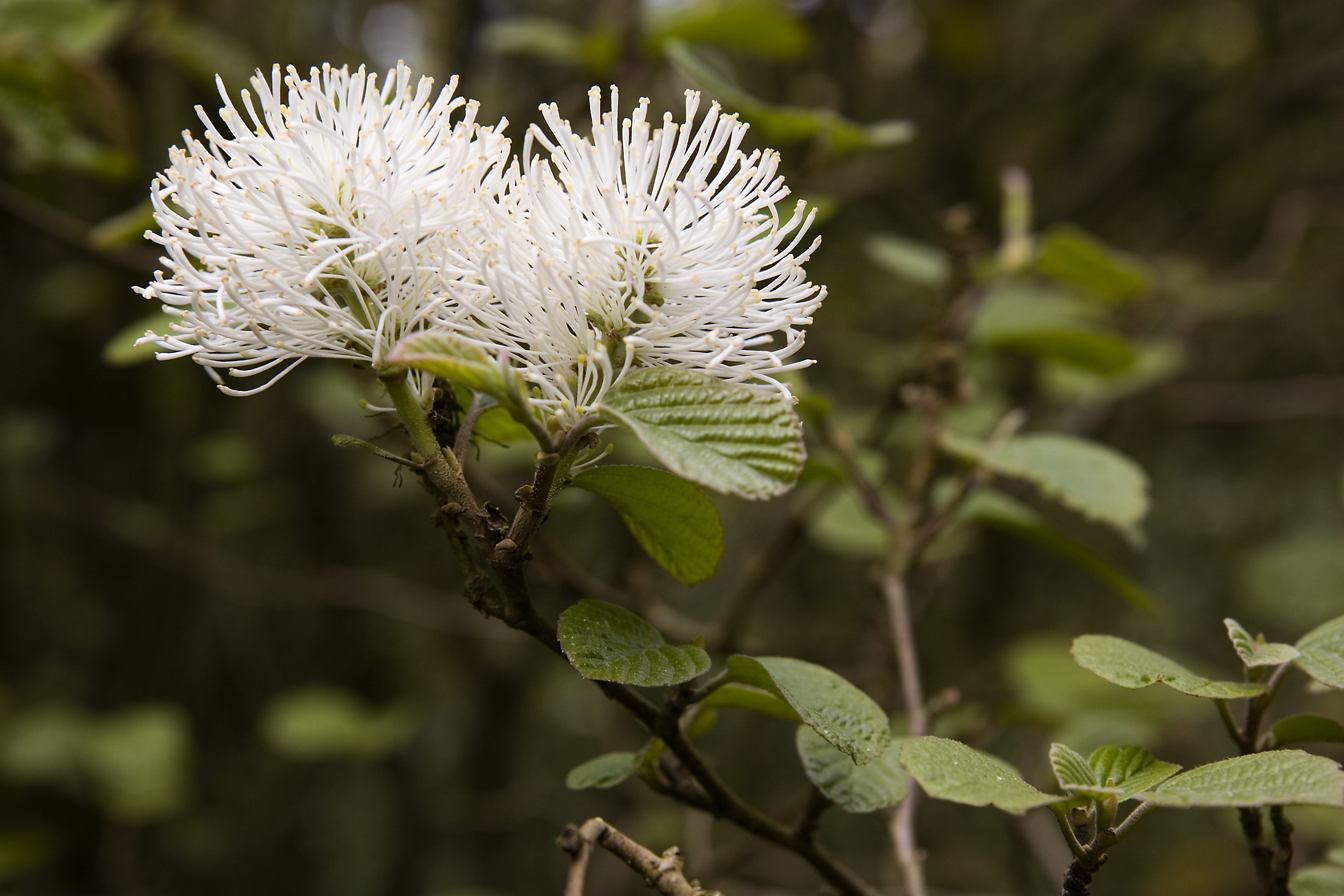

Conservation status
- Vulnerable (NatureServe)

Scientific classification
- Kingdom: Plantae
- Clade: Tracheophytes
- Clade: Angiosperms
- Clade: Eudicots
- Order: Saxifragales
- Family: Hamamelidaceae
- Genus: Fothergilla
- Species: F. latifolia

Binomial name
- Fothergilla latifolia J.F.Mill.

Synonyms
- Fothergilla alnifolia var. major Sims; Fothergilla major (Sims) Sweet; Fothergilla monticola Ashe

= Fothergilla latifolia =

Species of flowering plant

Fothergilla latifolia, the large witch alder or mountain witch alder, is a species of flowering plant in the genus Fothergilla, family Hamamelidaceae, that is native to woodland and swamps in the Allegheny Mountains and southern Appalachian Mountains of the southeastern United States. It is a deciduous shrub growing to 2.5 m (8 ft 2 in) with fragrant white bottlebrush flowers appearing along with, or before, the glossy leaves. The leaves often turn brilliant shades of red and orange in autumn.

Fothergilla latifolia prefers full sun to part shade and is disease and insect resistant. It thrives in moist, acidic soils, but is fairly drought tolerant. It is hardy in USDA hardiness zones 4–8.

This genus is named for the English physician and plant collector John Fothergill (1712-1780). The Latin specific epithet for the synonym major means "larger". It has gained the Royal Horticultural Society's Award of Garden Merit.

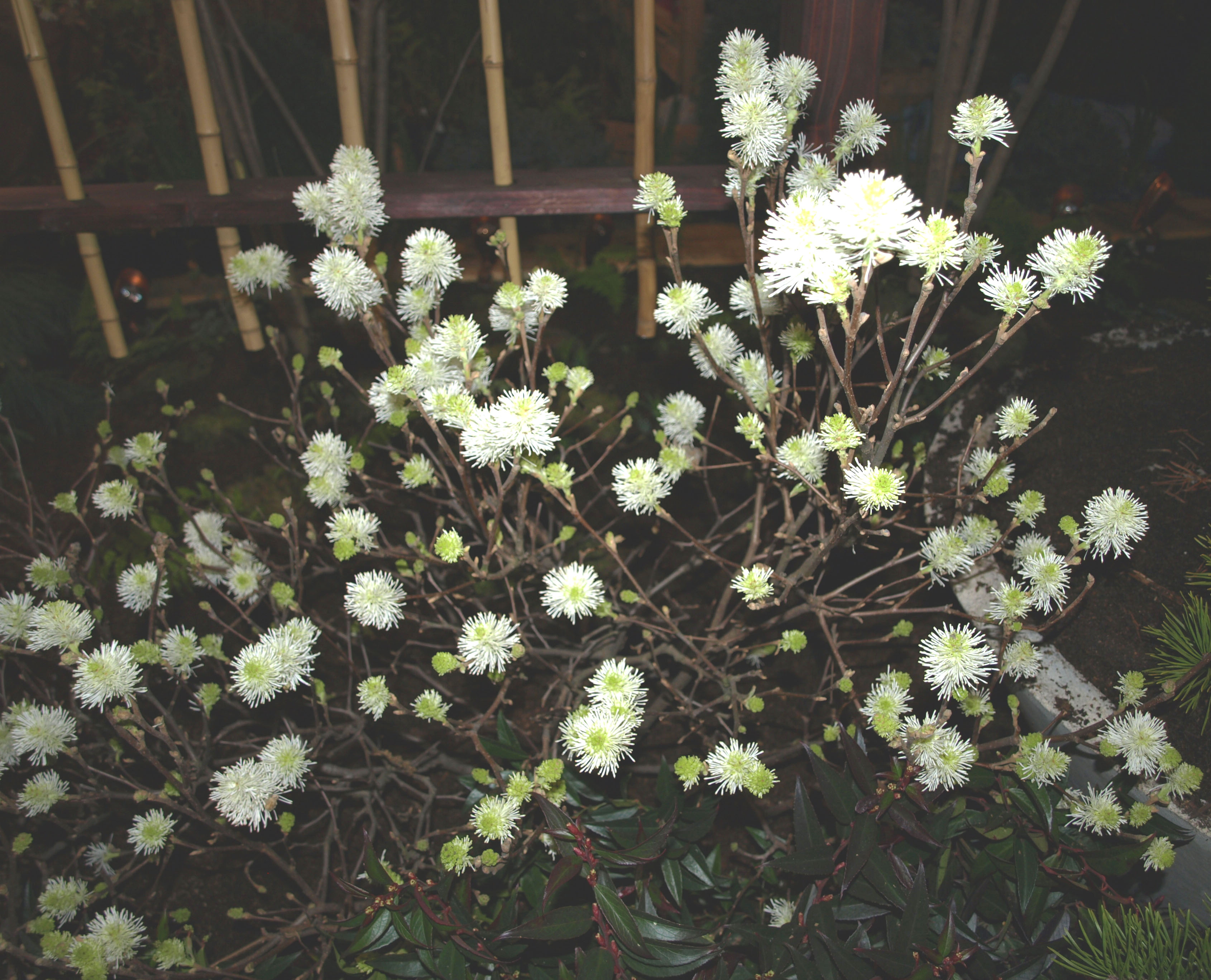

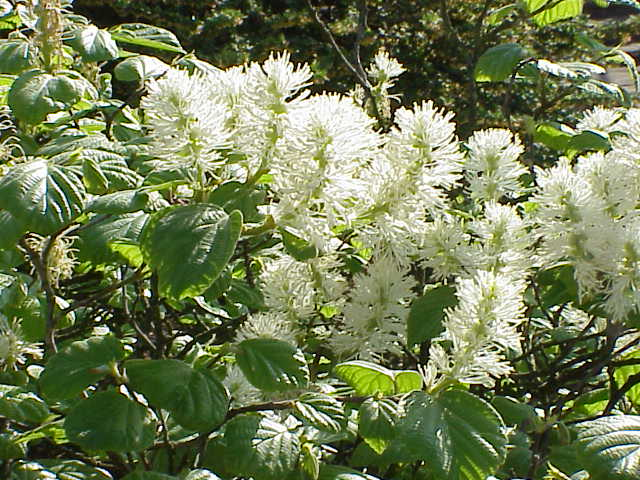
