= Rupelramphastoides =

Rupelramphastoides Temporal range: Lower Oligocene

Scientific classification
- Kingdom: Animalia
- Phylum: Chordata
- Class: Aves
- Order: Piciformes
- Genus: †Rupelramphastoides; Mayr, 2005
- Species: †R. knopfi

Binomial name
- †Rupelramphastoides knopfi Mayr, 2005

Extinct genus of birds

Rupelramphastoides is an extinct piciform from the Lower Oligocene of Central Europe (Germany). Only one species are recorded for genus, Rupelramphastoides knopfi, and it is classified "family incertae sedis", pending discovery of additional specimens.
