= Putillosaurus =

Scientific classification
- Kingdom: Animalia
- Phylum: Chordata
- Family: Dicynodontidae
- Genus: Putillosaurus Surkov, 2005
- Species: P. sennikovi

Binomial name
- 'Putillosaurus sennikovi Surkov, 2005

Extinct genus of dicynodonts

Putillosaurus sennikovi is an extinct species of synapsids which existed in Russia during the Lower Triassic, but the description was based solely on a premaxilla, and is considered a nomen dubium.
