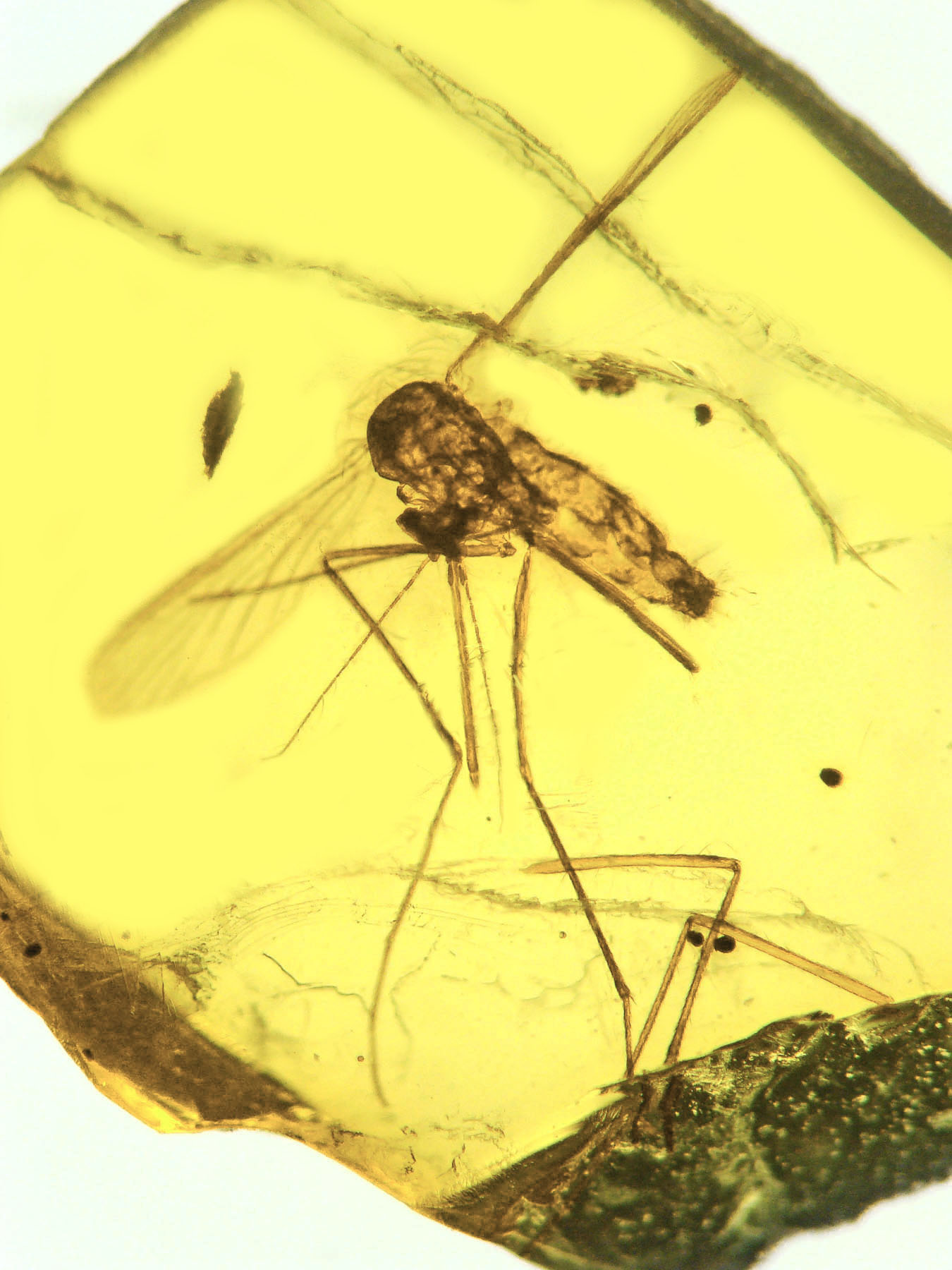
- Culex malariager in Dominican amber

Scientific classification
- Kingdom: Animalia
- Phylum: Arthropoda
- Class: Insecta
- Order: Diptera
- Family: Culicidae
- Genus: Culex
- Species: †C. malariager

Binomial name
- †Culex malariager Poinar, 2005

= Culex malariager =

Extinct species of mosquito

Culex malariager is an extinct species of mosquito in the genus Culex. It is the first recorded appearance of a mosquito infected by malarial parasites.

The female mosquito was found embedded in amber from the La Toca amber mine in the Dominican Republic, between Puerto Plata and Santiago. The amber, which is trapezoidal and weighs 2 grams, dates back to the Cenozoic era. It was identified as a vector of the parasite Plasmodium dominicana. The vertebrate host of P. dominicana is assumed to be avian.

== Description ==
The holotype female specimen is mostly complete, but many scales and bristles are detached. Only three of the legs—both forelegs and one of the midlegs—are attached to the body.

Culex malariager is a small mosquito, measuring 4.1 mm in length. The head itself is 0.59 mm by 0.66 mm. Thorax and abdomen are 1.2 mm and 2.3 mm respectively.
