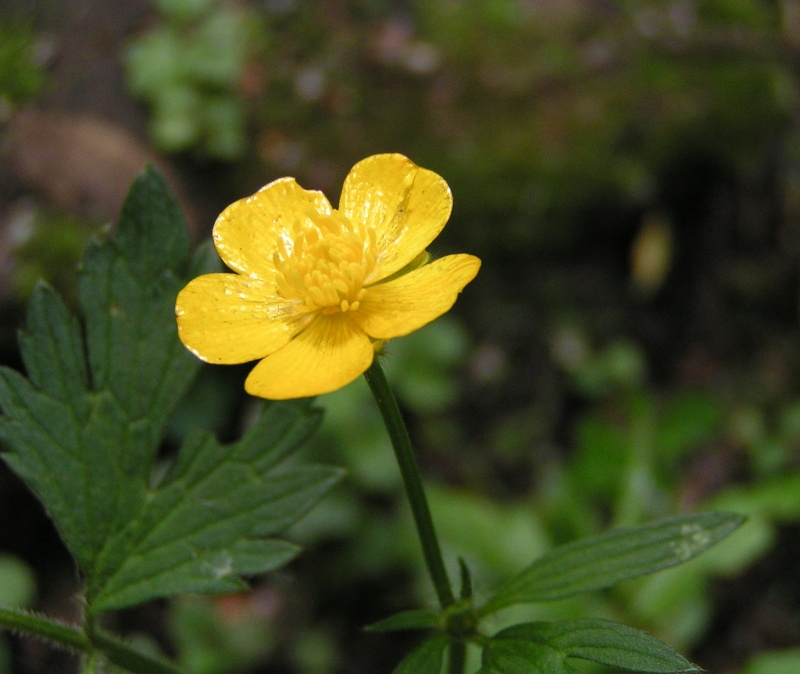
- Ranunculus repens

Scientific classification
- Kingdom: Plantae
- Clade: Tracheophytes
- Clade: Angiosperms
- Clade: Eudicots
- Order: Ranunculales; Juss. ex Bercht. & J.Presl

Families
- See text

= Ranunculales =

Ranunculales Temporal range: 124–0 Ma Early Cretaceous–Recent

Basal order of flowering plants in the eudicots

Ranunculales is an order of flowering plants. Of necessity it contains the family Ranunculaceae, the buttercup family, because the name of the order is based on the name of a genus in that family. Ranunculales belongs to a paraphyletic group known as the basal eudicots. It is sister to the remaining members of this group; in other words, it is sister to the remaining eudicots. Widely known members include poppies, barberries, hellebores, and buttercups.

== Taxonomy ==
The Angiosperm Phylogeny Group recognized seven families in Ranunculales in their APG III system, published in 2009. In the preceding APG II system, they offered the option of three segregate families as shown below.

- Order Ranunculales
  Family Berberidaceae
  Family Circaeasteraceae
  [+ Family Kingdoniaceae ]
  Family Eupteleaceae
  Family Lardizabalaceae
  Family Menispermaceae
  Family Papaveraceae
  [+ Family Fumariaceae ]
  [+ Family Pteridophyllaceae ]
  Family Ranunculaceae

Note: "+ ..." = optionally separate family (that may be split off from the preceding family).

Under this definition, well-known members of Ranunculales include buttercups, clematis, columbines, delphiniums, and poppies.

A phylogeny of Ranunculales was published in 2009, based on molecular phylogenetic analysis of DNA sequences. The authors of this paper revised the subfamilies and tribes of the order. This is reflected in the subsequent revision of the APG, APG IV (2016).

The analysis revealed that the order consisted of three clades, Eupteleaceae, Papaveraceae and a third clade, considered to be the "core" Ranuculales, consisting of the remaining five families. The phylogeny of the families is shown in the cladogram.

Cladogram of Ranunculales families

- Ranunculales
  - - Eupteleaceae
    - - Papaveraceae
      - - - Circaeasteraceae
          - Lardizabalaceae
        - - Menispermaceae
          - - Berberidaceae
            - Ranunculaceae

=== Evolution ===
The fossil form Leefructus, described in 2011, has been recognized as a member of this order. Leefructus mirus shows fully developed leaves; stem and flower that are very similar in structure to those of the modern buttercups. The fossil is dated to 125 Mya (million years old) and it not only proves that Ranunculales is an ancient group of eudicots but demonstrates that the whole angiosperm clade may be older than expected. The structure of the plant and its age may lead to a new approach regarding the field that studies the evolution of flowering plants. The fact that Leefructus shows a well-developed structure similar to modern ranunculids suggests that this group of eudicots may have developed earlier than the age of the fossil.

Another fossil has been described with the name Teixeiraea, also from the Cretaceous of Portugal. The genus Atli from the Late Cretaceous of Canada appears to have had a liana-like growth habit.

According to molecular clock calculations, the lineage that led to Ranunculales split from other plants about 132 Mya or 140 Mya.

== History ==
Historically the term Ranales was used to include the Ranunculaceae and related families, as described by Bentham and Hooker. This became replaced with Ranunculales by Melchior in 1964.

The Cronquist system (1981) also recognised the order, but placed it in the subclass Magnoliidae, in class Magnoliopsida [= dicotyledons]. It used this circumscription:

- order Ranunculales
  family Ranunculaceae
  family Circaeasteraceae
  family Berberidaceae
  family Sargentodoxaceae
  family Lardizabalaceae
  family Menispermaceae
  family Coriariaceae
  family Sabiaceae

In the Cronquist system, the Papaveraceae and Fumariaceae (including the plants in the optional family Pteridophyllaceae) were treated as a separate order Papaverales, placed in this same subclass Magnoliidae. The Cronquist circumscription of Ranunculales is now known to be polyphyletic. Sabiaceae is in a clade of eudicots separate from Ranunculales. Coriariaceae is now placed in the order Cucurbitales.

== Bibliography ==
- Angiosperm Phylogeny Group (2009). "An update of the Angiosperm Phylogeny Group classification for the orders and families of flowering plants: APG III". Botanical Journal of the Linnean Society. 161 (2): 105–121. doi:10.1111/j.1095-8339.2009.00996.x. hdl:10654/18083.
- Angiosperm Phylogeny Group (2016). "An update of the Angiosperm Phylogeny Group classification for the orders and families of flowering plants: APG IV". Botanical Journal of the Linnean Society. 181 (1): 1–20. doi:10.1111/boj.12385.
- Wang, Wei; Lu, An-Ming; Ren, Yi; Endress, Mary E.; Chen, Zhi-Duan (January 2009). "Phylogeny and classification of Ranunculales: Evidence from four molecular loci and morphological data". Perspectives in Plant Ecology, Evolution and Systematics. 11 (2): 81–110. Bibcode:2009PPEES..11...81W. doi:10.1016/j.ppees.2009.01.001.
