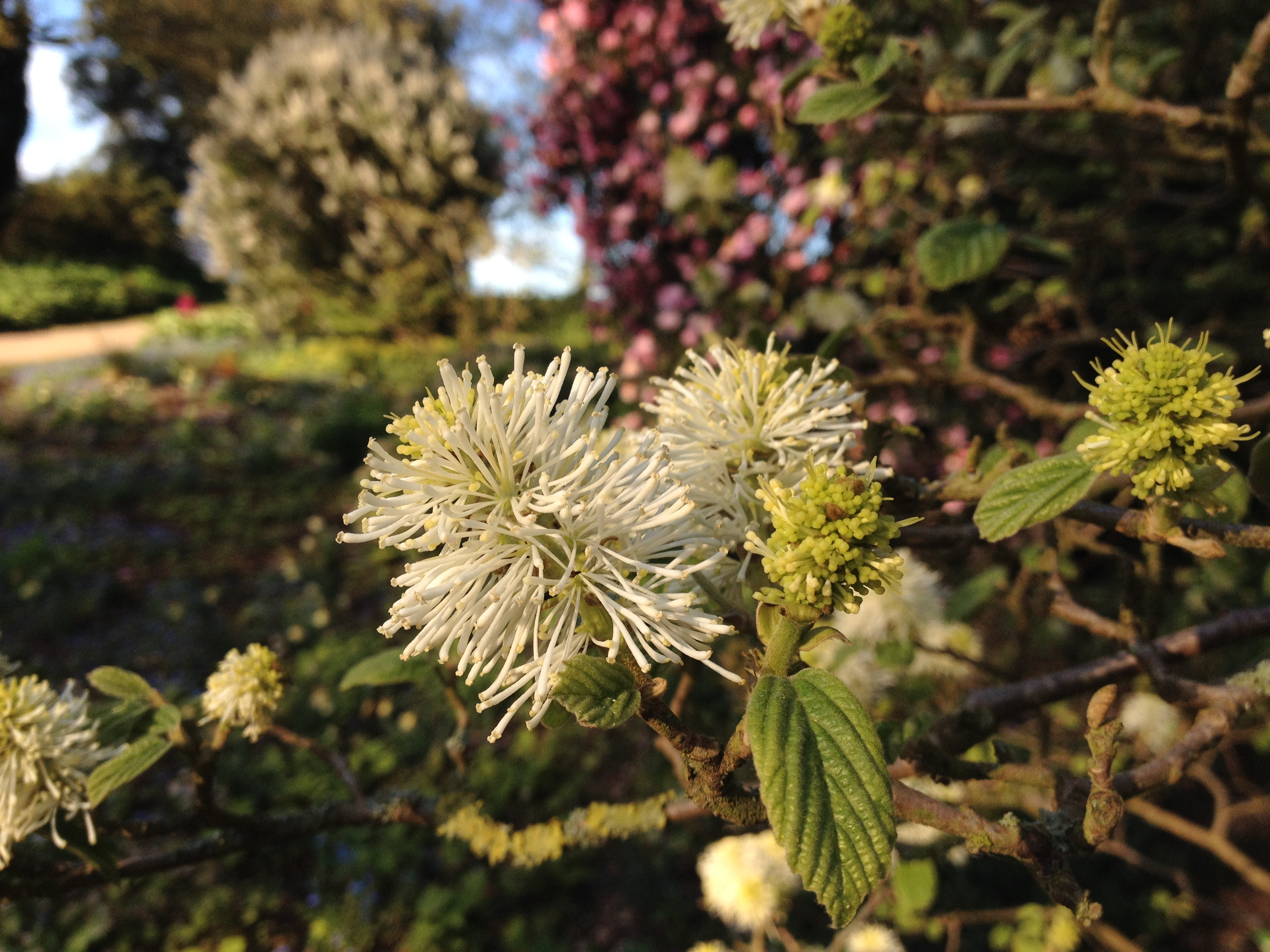

Scientific classification
- Kingdom: Plantae
- Clade: Tracheophytes
- Clade: Angiosperms
- Clade: Eudicots
- Order: Saxifragales
- Family: Hamamelidaceae
- Genus: Fothergilla
- Species: F. gardenii

Binomial name
- Fothergilla gardenii L.

= Fothergilla gardenii =

Species of flowering plant

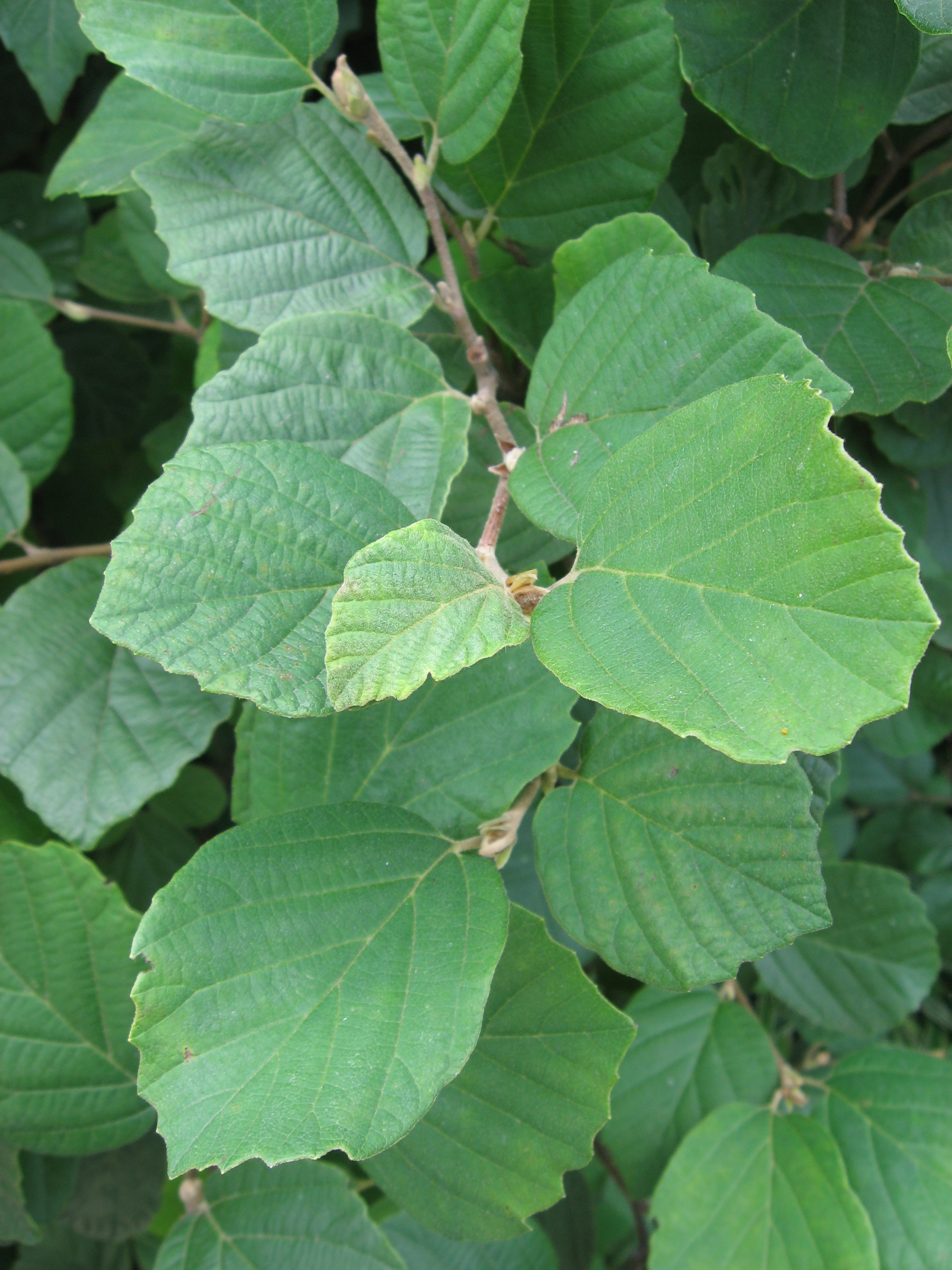
Fothergilla gardenii foliage

Fothergilla gardenii, also known by the common names witch alder, dwarf fothergilla, American wych hazel, pocosin witchalder, and dwarf witchalder is a deciduous shrub in the Hamamelidaceae family. It is one of two species in the genus Fothergilla.

== Description ==
- Type: Slow-growing deciduous shrub.
- Height/spread: Max height and spread is 0.9 m (3 ft) to 1 m (3 ft).
- Leaves: Dark green, alternate leaves emerge in spring and range in shape from oval to obovate. Sizes up to 6 cm (2.5 in) in length, with irregularly toothed margins. Striking autumn colors, including bright red, crimson, orange, and yellow.
- Inflorescences: Terminal cylindrical spikes to 4 cm (1.5 in) are borne in spring, before the leaves emerge.
  - Flowers: Small, white, petal-less, highly fragrant. Conspicuous filaments are 2.5 cm (1 in) long.

== Distribution ==
Native to the southeastern USA, from North Carolina to Alabama.

== Cultivation ==
- Hardiness: Fully hardy, to -29 °C (-20 °F). USDA zones 5-9.
- Cultivation: Prefers full sun or partial shade and humus-rich, well-drained soil which is kept moist. Full sun gives the best autumn color. Does well in woodland gardens or shrub borders.
- Propagation:
  - Seed Sow seed outdoors in a cold frame or seedbed in autumn or winter. Seed typically germinates the second spring after sowing. Fresh seed works best.
  - Cuttings Take softwood cuttings in summer and root them in a mist unit.
  - Layering:
    - Air Layering Air layering in summer.
    - Simple Layering Can be propagated by layering.
- Pests and Diseases: Trouble free.

== Cultivars ==
The cultivar 'Blue Mist' is grown for its glaucous blue-green foliage.

== Etymology ==
Fothergilla is named for Dr. John Fothergill (1712-1780) of Stratford, Essex, a physician and introducer of American plants.

Gardenii is named for Dr. Alexander Garden (1730-1791), an Anglo-American botanist and correspondent with Carl Linnaeus.
