= Plasmodium dominicana =

Scientific classification
- Domain: Eukaryota
- Clade: Sar
- Clade: Alveolata
- Phylum: Apicomplexa
- Class: Aconoidasida
- Order: Haemospororida
- Family: Plasmodiidae
- Genus: Plasmodium
- Species: P. dominicana

Binomial name
- Plasmodium dominicana Poinar, 2005

Species of single-celled organism

Plasmodium dominicana is an extinct parasite of the genus Plasmodium.

The species is only known from a mosquito fossil, dating from the Cenozoic era, that was found embedded in amber. The mosquito vector was identified as Culex malariager. The fossil was found in what is now the Dominican Republic.

The vertebrate host of this species is unknown but it seems likely that it may have been a bird.

== Description ==
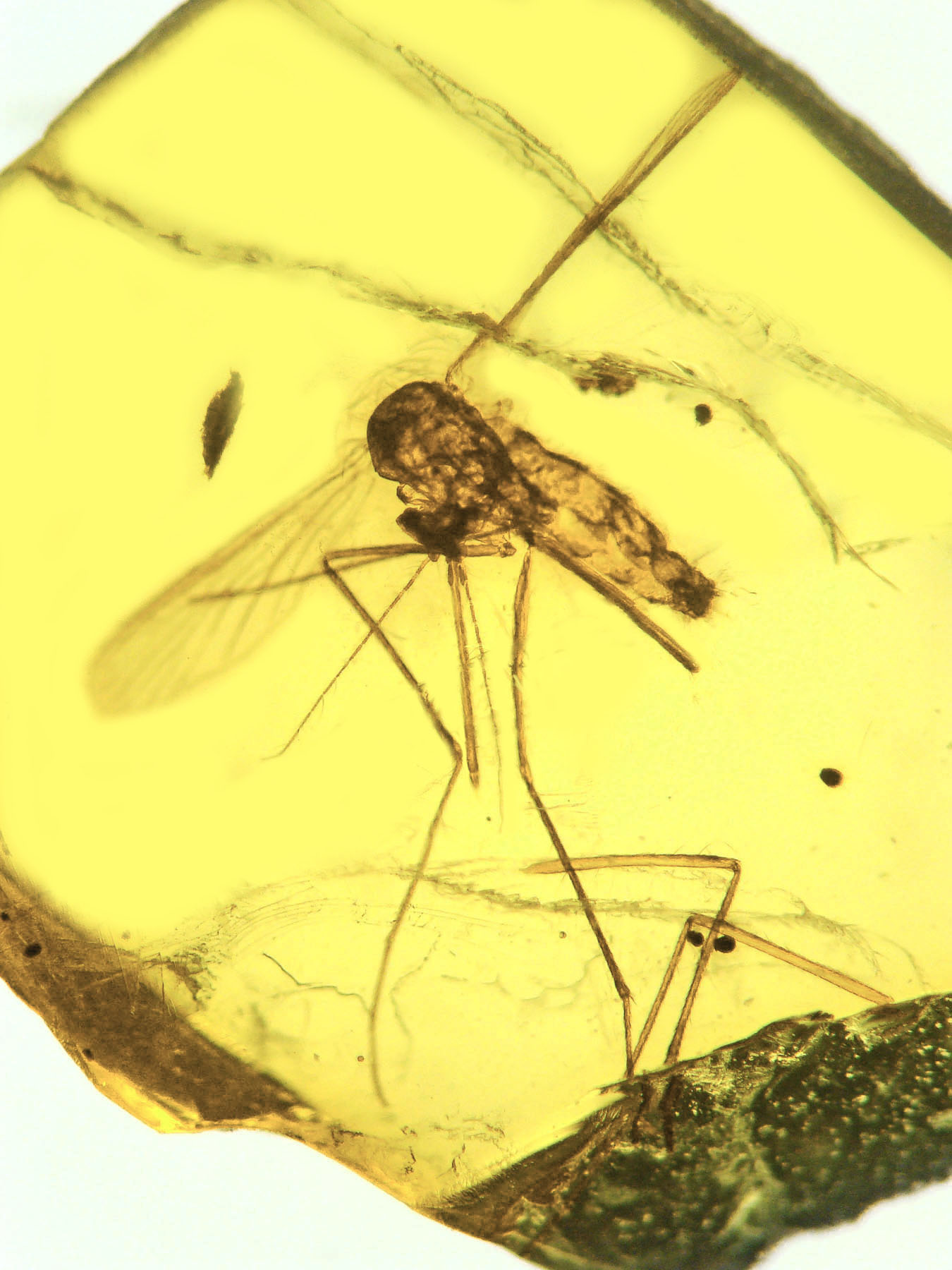
Oldest mosquito fossil with Plasmodium dominicana, 15–20 million years old

The parasite was first described by Poinar in 2005. It appears that it may have been a relation of Plasmodium juxtanucleare which would place it in the subgenus Bennettinia.

Four oocysts were present in the mosquito, two ruptured and two entire. They were large, measuring between 75 and 105 μm in diameter. Sporozoites were found around the ruptured oocysts as well as in the salivary glands. A possible ookinete was observed.

== Geographical occurrence ==
The fossil was found in the La Toca amber mine, Dominican Republic.

== Clinical features and host pathology ==
The host seems likely to have been a member of the order Galliformes but this cannot be confirmed.
