= Winter hazel =

Winter hazel is a common name for several plants and may refer to:

- Corylopsis
  - Corylopsis pauciflora, native to eastern Asia and the Himalayas
- Distylium
