= Witch hazel (disambiguation) =

Witch hazel (Hamamelis) is a genus of flowering shrubs.

Witch hazel may also refer to:

- Witch hazel (astringent), an astringent topical medicine derived from the Hamamelis plant
- Witch Hazel (Disney), a Disney cartoon and comics character
- Witch Hazel (Looney Tunes), a Looney Tunes cartoon character
- Witch Hazel, Oregon, United States, an unincorporated community
- Buttercup witch hazel, Corylopsis pauciflora, a spring-flowering shrub

== See also ==
- Witchazel, an album by Matt Berry
