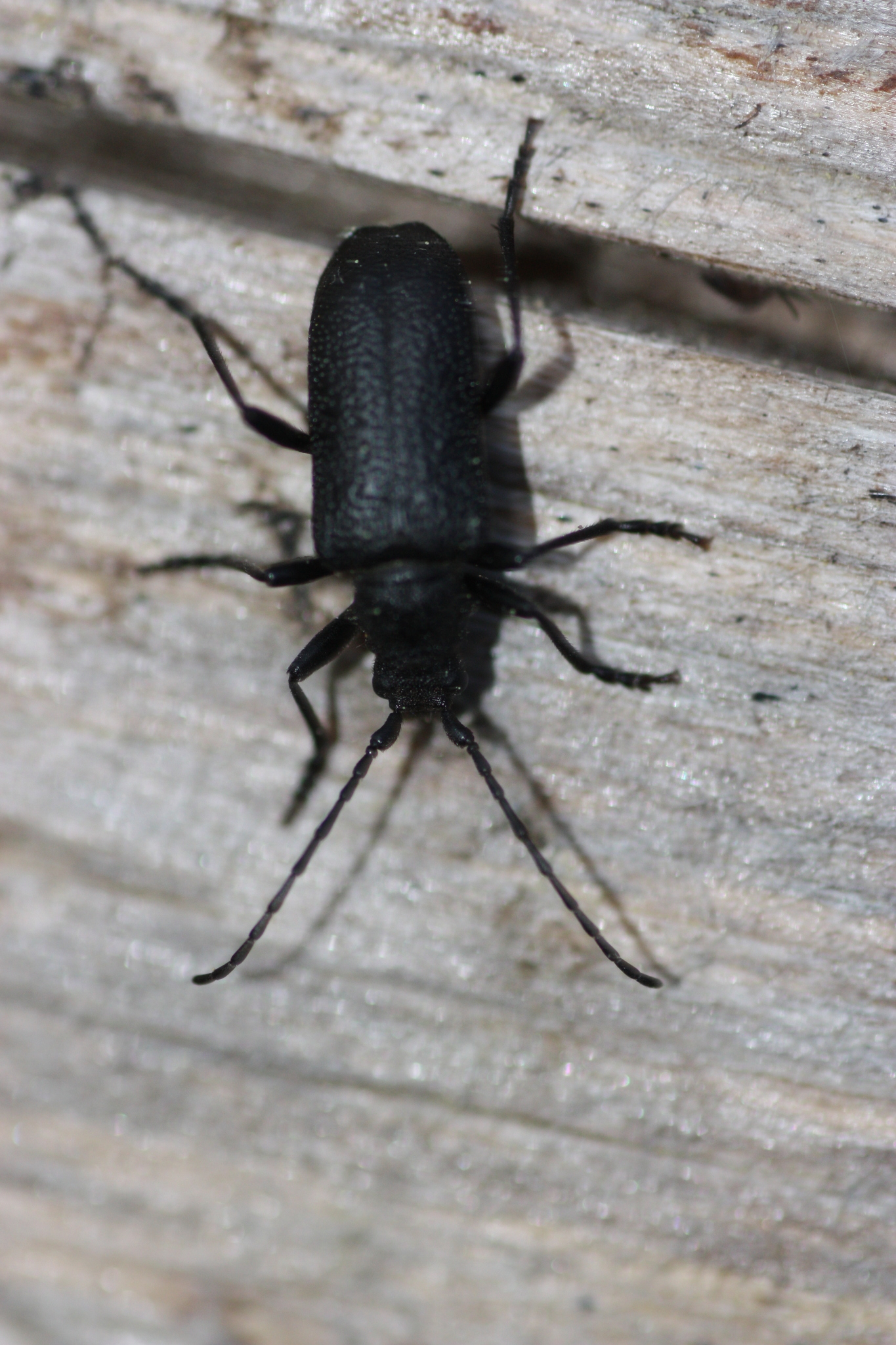
- Neanthophylax tenebrosus, Washington

Scientific classification
- Kingdom: Animalia
- Phylum: Arthropoda
- Class: Insecta
- Order: Coleoptera
- Suborder: Polyphaga
- Infraorder: Cucujiformia
- Family: Cerambycidae
- Subfamily: Lepturinae
- Tribe: Oxymirini
- Genus: Neanthophylax
- Species: N. tenebrosus

Binomial name
- Neanthophylax tenebrosus (LeConte, 1873)

Synonyms
- Anthophilax tenebrosus Nicolay, 1917; Anthophylax tenebrosus Boppe, 1921; Neanthophylax tenebrosus tenebrosus Linsley & Chemsak, 1972

= Neanthophylax tenebrosus =

Species of beetle

Neanthophylax tenebrosus is a species in the longhorn beetle family Cerambycidae, found in United States. The adult beetles feed on mountain hemlock and red fir.

== Subspecies ==
These subspecies belong to the species Neanthophylax tenebrosus:

- Neanthophylax tenebrosus nigrolineatus (Van Dyke, 1917) (Canada and United States)
- Neanthophylax tenebrosus orientalis Linsley & Chemsak, 1972 (United States)
