= Rutgers Gardens =

Botanical garden in North Brunswick, New Jersey

Coordinates: 40.4743°N 74.4226°W

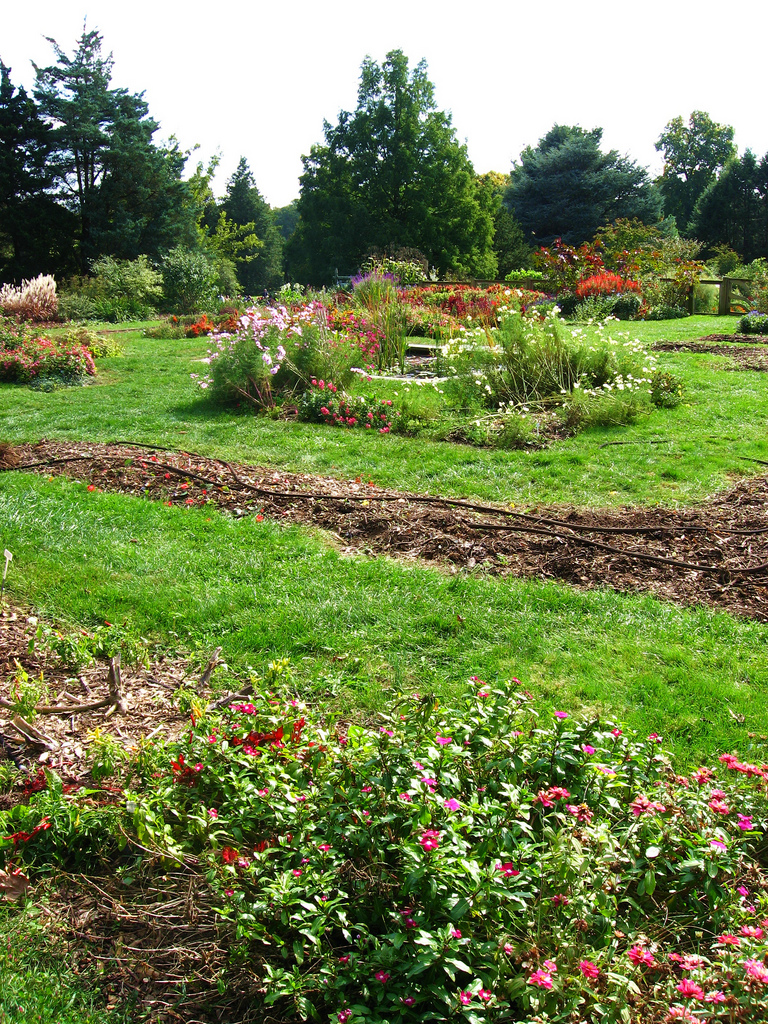
- One section of the gardens.
- Interactive map of Rutgers Gardens
- Website: Official website

Rutgers Gardens is a 180-acre public botanical garden of Rutgers University, located adjacent to Rutgers School of Environmental and Biological Sciences at 112 Log Cabin Road, North Brunswick, New Jersey, 08902 on Rutgers - New Brunswick campus. The grounds include 60 acres of designed beds, specialty gardens, tree and shrub collections, lawns, and walking paths, and the adjoining nearly 60-acre Frank G. Helyar Woods. The gardens are open year-round, without fee, and feature horticultural collections arranged in garden settings. In 2017 it was granted landmark status by the American Society for Horticultural Science.

== History ==
Wolpert Farm was originally purchased on May 17, 1916, from Jacob and Celia Lipman. Rutgers Gardens—then called Horticultural Farm No. 1, housed the Experiment Station's peach-breeding program, although ornamental displays were also established in the early 1920s in conjunction with ongoing ornamental research. In 1930, the farm featured more than 600 varieties of dahlias and iris, including test gardens developed in coordination with the Dahlia Society of New Jersey and the American Iris Society. Trials of gladiolus were also established, in cooperation with the New Jersey Gladiolus Society. These and other displays showcase selected and developed varieties in cooperation with community organizations. Around this time, a shrub display garden containing over 200 species and numerous varieties was established, which remains one of the oldest surviving sections of the existing collection (which was expanded between 1930 and 1950).

Some of the oldest hollies at Rutgers Gardens were planted in the late 1930s, and expanded through the 40s, 50s, and into the 60s, as part of an active breeding program. Many of these make up the foundation of what is now a significant collection. A 1936 photo of Horticultural Farm No. 1 shows a series of nine display gardens, of which the bearded iris display was the precursor to the current Donald B. Lacey Display Garden, originally constructed in 1964. Later additions and removals of plants, as well the establishment of various new ornamental and tribute gardens, have shaped Rutgers Gardens into its current form. The name of Rutgers Gardens is strongly associated with that of Bruce "Doc" Hamilton. In the 1990s, despite strong opposition, Rutgers University planned to sell Rutgers Gardens for urban development. In 1993, Dr. Bruce Hamilton, Rutgers professor, accepted responsibility for directing the Gardens' management and funding. Thanks to his dedication, to generous supporters, and to the work of many volunteers, the Gardens survived for everybody's enjoyment.

Rutgers Gardens is directed by Lauren Errickson, Director of Rutgers Gardens and Campus Stewardship, who leads its development, programming, and operations. Still a self-supporting entity, the funds necessary for maintaining the gardens, purchasing equipment and materials, supporting salaries, and providing public programs are raised through facility rentals, special events, membership dues and donations.

Rutgers Gardens hosts a seasonal Rutgers Community Farmers Market as part of its community programming.

== Collections and features ==
Current collections and features include:

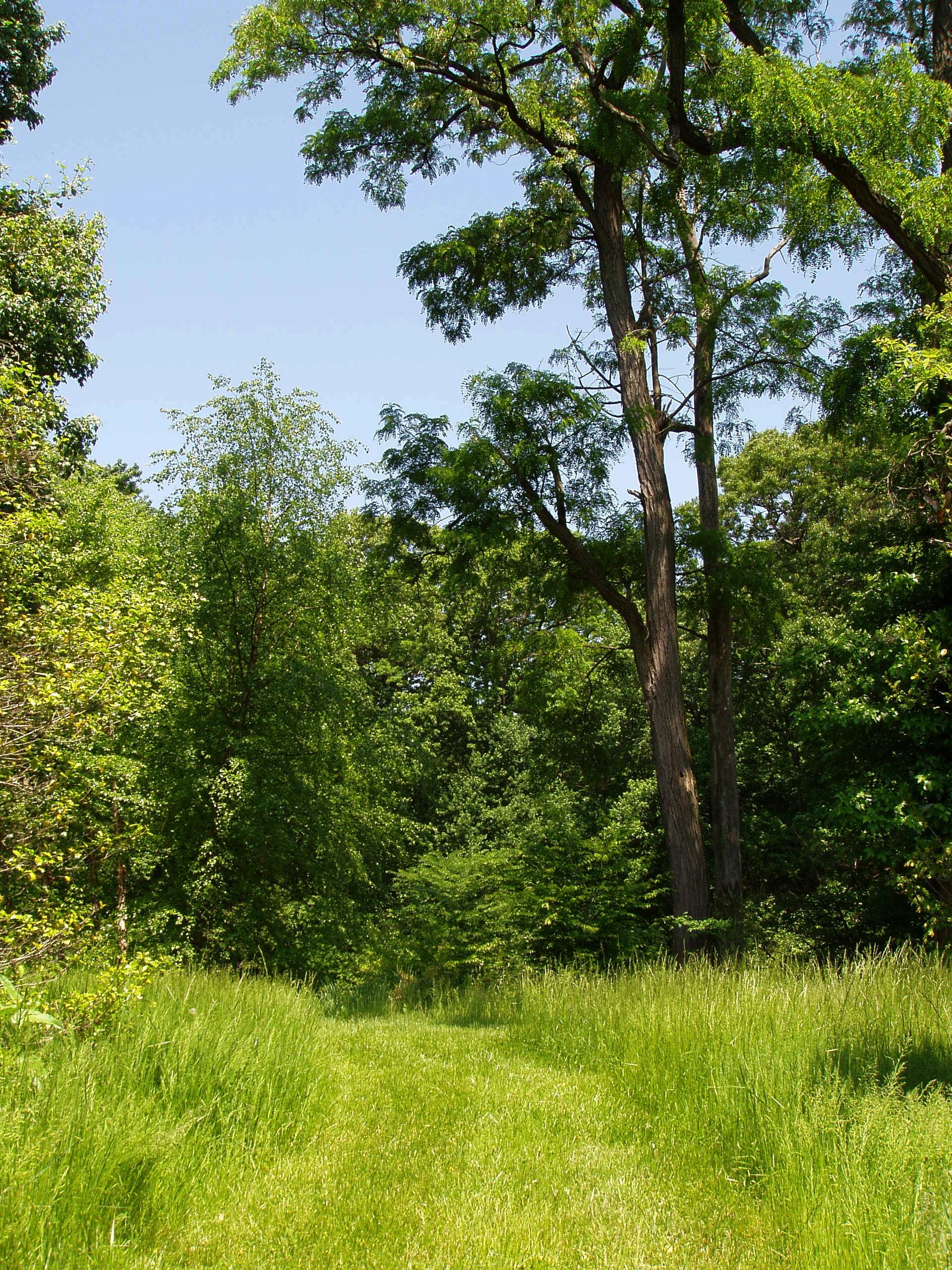
Helyar Woods in Rutgers Gardens at Rutgers School of Environmental and Biological Sciences

- American Hollies - one of the largest collection of American Hollies in the United States, including selections from Dr. Elwin Orton's Ilex opaca breeding program.
- Bamboo Forest - a large grove of bamboo (Phyllostachys nuda), originally planted in the 1950s, with a winding path by a small stream.
- Donald B. Lacey Display Garden - unusual and colorful annuals, tropicals, herbs, and vegetables.
- Ella Quimby Water Conservation Terrace - demonstration of drought-tolerant plants, including Amorpha canescens, Berberis, Ceanothus americanus, Hypericum 'Hidcote', Juniperus, and Hylotelephium telephium (formerly Sedum) 'Autumn Joy'.
- Ornamental Tree Collection - unusual small trees, including India Quassiawood (Picrasma ailanthoides), the state's largest Paperbark Maple (Acer griseum), a very large Persian Ironwood (Parrotia persica), and a fine Cornus kousa var. chinensis.
- Rhododendron and Azalea Garden - small trees and groundcovers, with a variety of shrubs focusing on rhododendrons. The collection started in the 1930s and now includes Cornus kousa, Davidia involucrata, Metasequoia glyptostroboides, and Rhododendron mucronulatum.
- Rain Garden - The intent was to develop a garden with positive environmental aspects, yet that remained attractive throughout the year with minimal maintenance. It contains a water feature with a 750-gallon cistern that is recharged via the rain water from the roof of a shed located 30 feet uphill of the garden. The water is circulated through the water feature via a pump at the bottom of the cistern through a series of bogs, over a waterfall and back into the cistern. The waterfall above the cistern is essential for permitting aeration of the water. Two layers of 2" thick filter material lie above the cistern to capture any sediment and debris that would otherwise accumulate in the cistern.
- Roy H. De Boer Evergreen Garden (1958) - fine specimens of Pinus strobus 'Pendula', Tsuga canadensis 'Sargentii', and many other cedars, pines, spruces, and firs.
- Shade Tree Collection - many mature shade trees, including Aesculus, Toona sinensis, Tetradium hupehensis, Fagus, Quercus dentata, Tilia, and Ulmus specimens.
- Shrub Collection - hybrid and species lilacs (dating from 1927) and other shrubs, including Buddleia alternifolia, Corylopsis spicata, Diervilla lonicera, and Hamamelis vernalis. The garden also includes two notable trees: Magnolia kobus and Magnolia virginiana.
- Tribute Gardens - a series of "outdoor rooms" that are available for a person, family or corporation to build in honor of someone they know or love. The garden "library" is the Art Rudolph Sun and Shade Garden, featuring two patios—including one beneath the Lillian Koelsch gazebo—for quietly sitting and reading a book. This room features plants that will provide color and interest in a garden that spends part of the day in sun, the remainder in shade. The "recreation room," the Edwin J. and Ida M. Otken Memorial Garden, is partially enclosed by a "Victorian Style" fence, and features a mixed border of shrubs, perennials and ornamental grasses, a large walk area, and a central grass circle that features two bright-green, oversized Adirondack chairs, which have become a popular identifying feature of Rutgers Gardens.
- VSA (Volunteer Supported Agriculture) Garden - located adjacent to the Community Youth Garden, behind the Donald B. Lacey Display Garden. The VSA vegetable gardeners follow organic growing methods which include chemical free gardening, four-year crop rotations, green mulches, composting and the incorporation of winter cover crops. These organic methods support a dynamic living soil ecology resulting in stronger pest and disease resistant plants. Harvests are shared among the VSA volunteers and a portion is donated to local soup kitchens.

== Landmarks ==
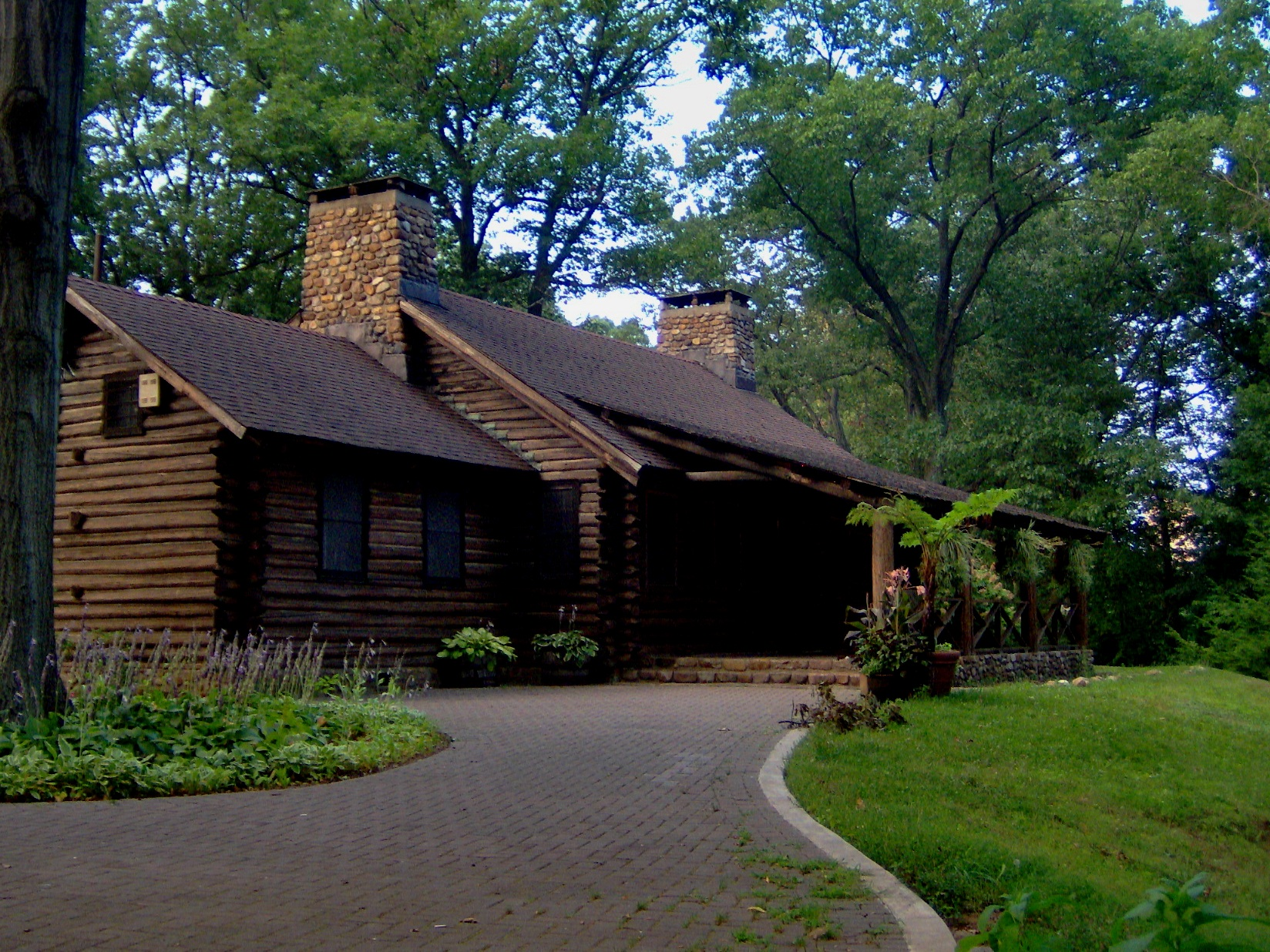
Exterior of the log cabin

- Log Cabin - The Log Cabin was built in 1936 by the Works Progress Administration (WPA). Today it is actively used for receptions and other events in the gardens. The log cabin overlooks Westons Mill Pond, a section of the Lawrence Brook.
- Holly House - As you enter the Rutgers Gardens, adjacent to the American Hollies, you will find a historic blue building now known as Holly House. One of the original structures at Horticultural Farm No. 1, it was built in the early 1930s by the Civilian Conservation Corps (CCC), a public work relief program during the Great Depression. Its original purpose was for storage and sorting of research materials. Holly House was renovated in the 80s, and it now acts as the headquarters for the Garden Club of New Jersey and as the site for a number of continuing education classes.

== Gallery ==
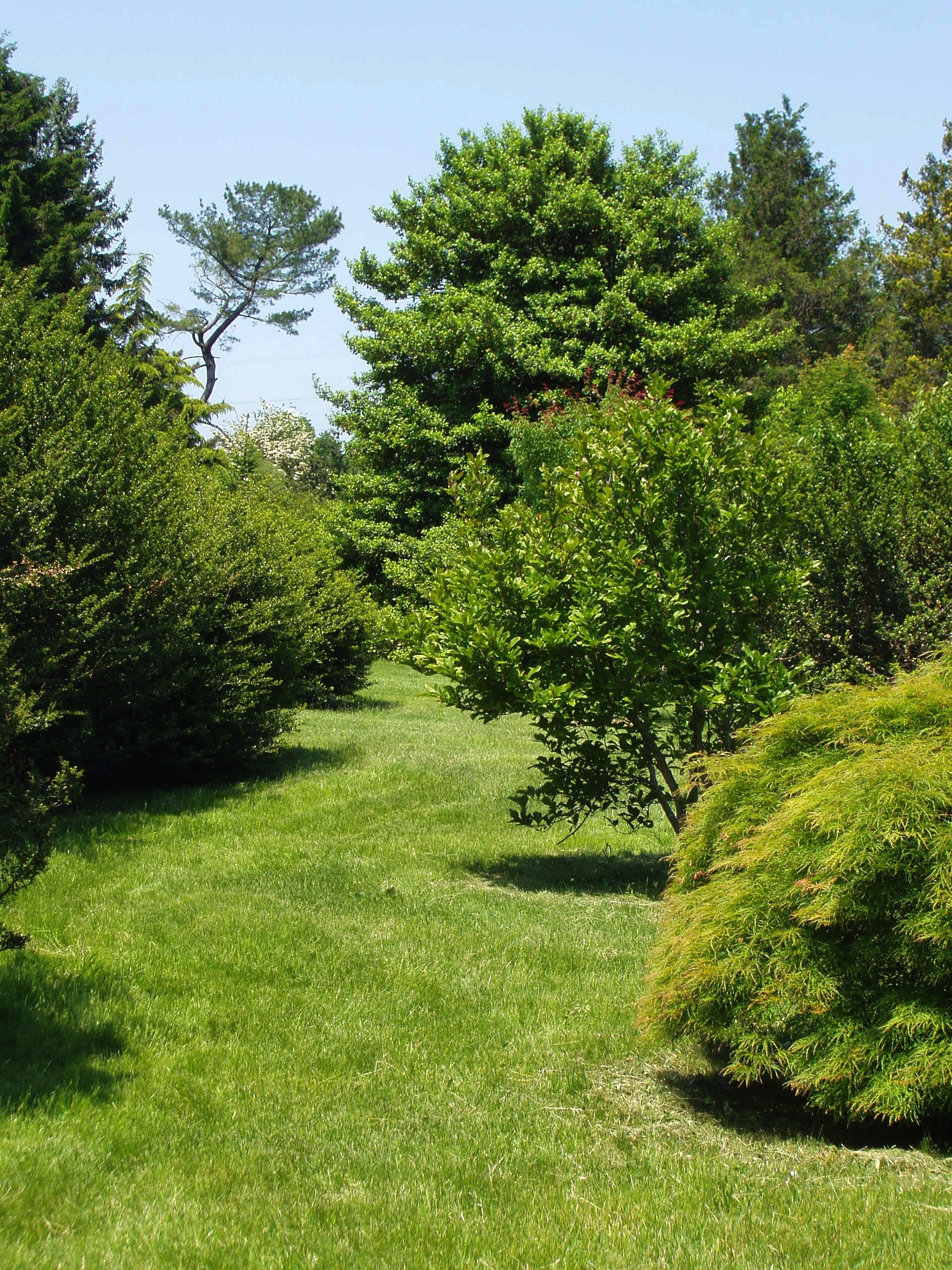
Arboretum

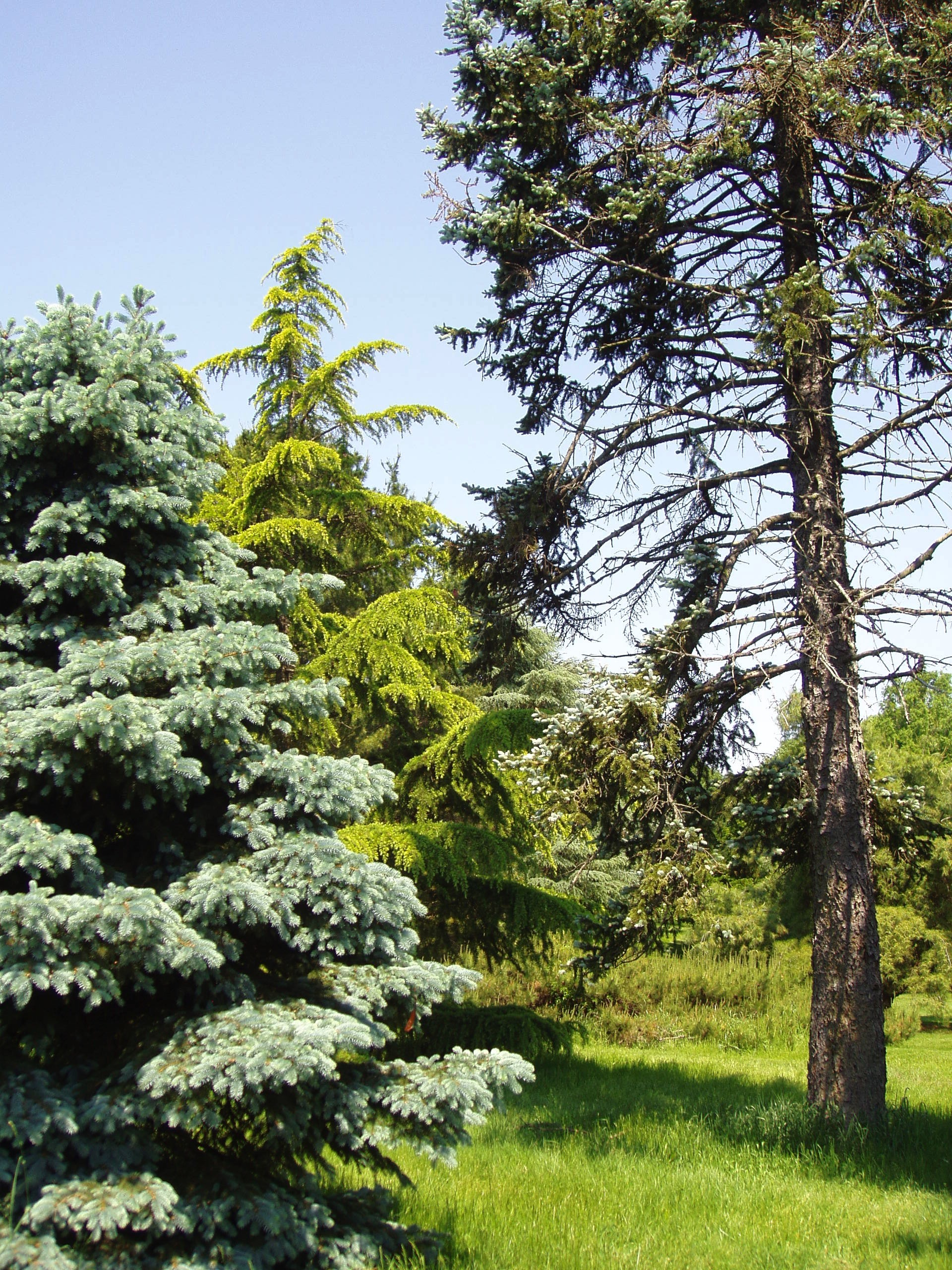
Conifers

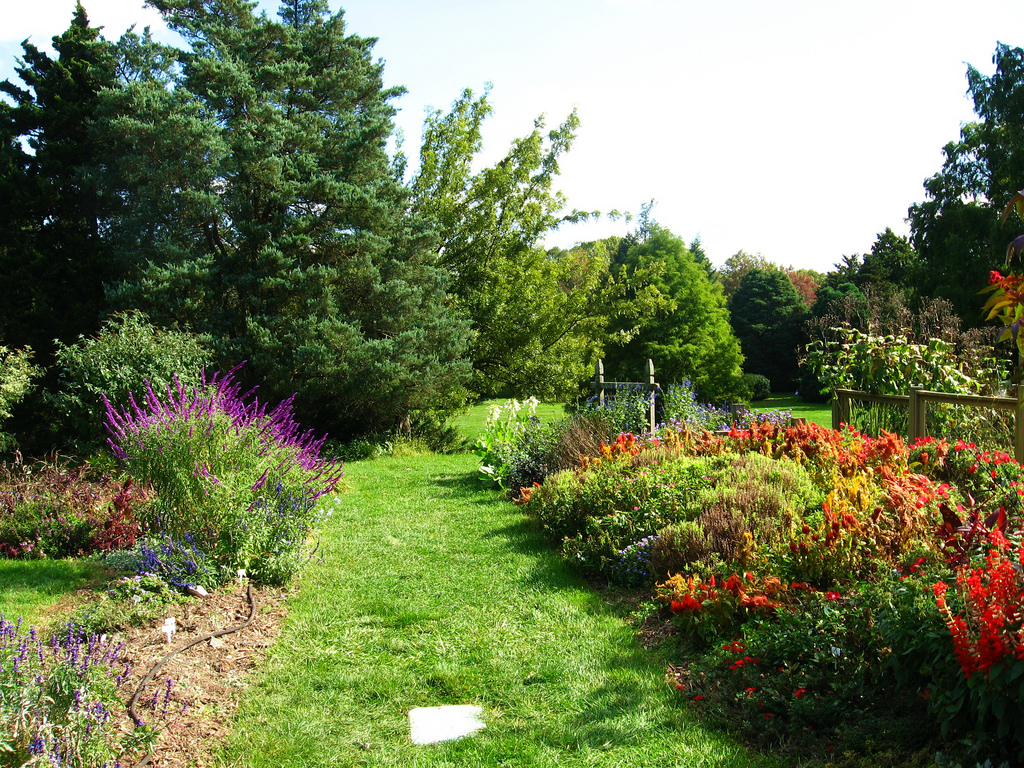
Rutgers Gardens late in the season

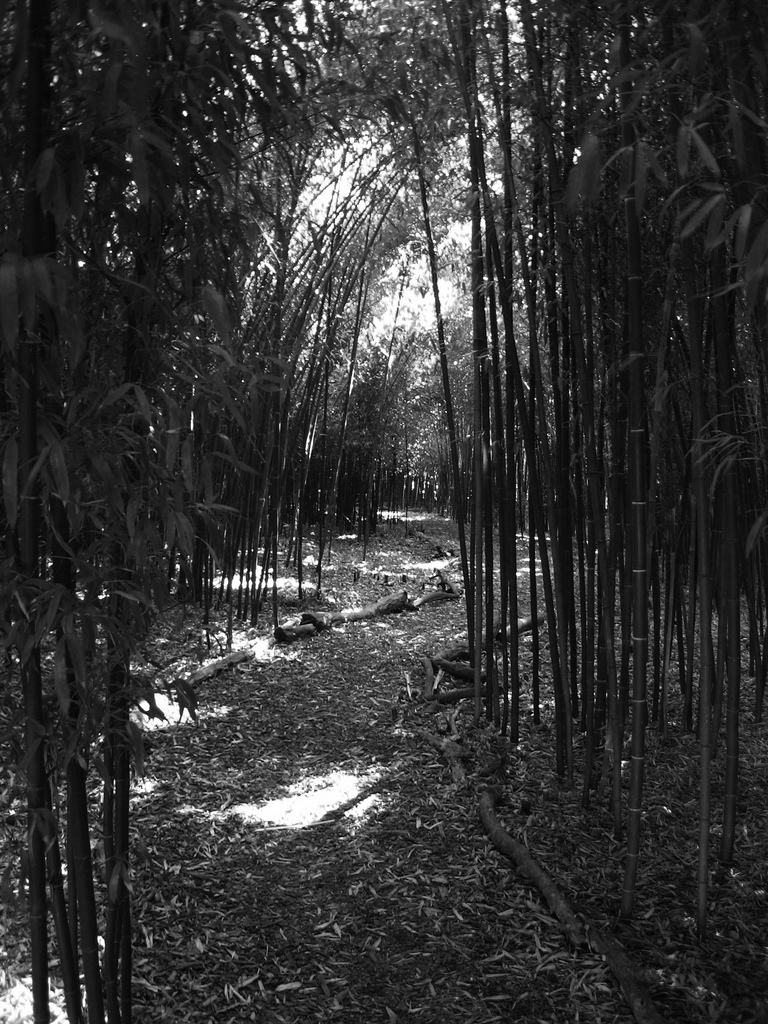
Bamboo Forest

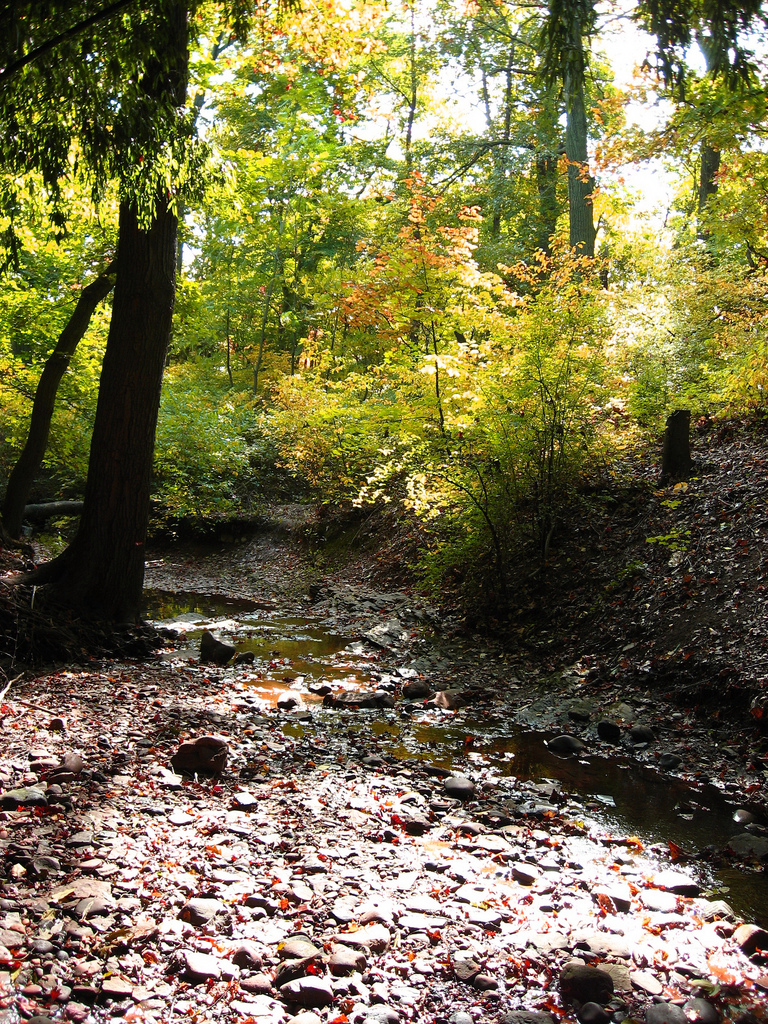
Stream in Rutgers Gardens

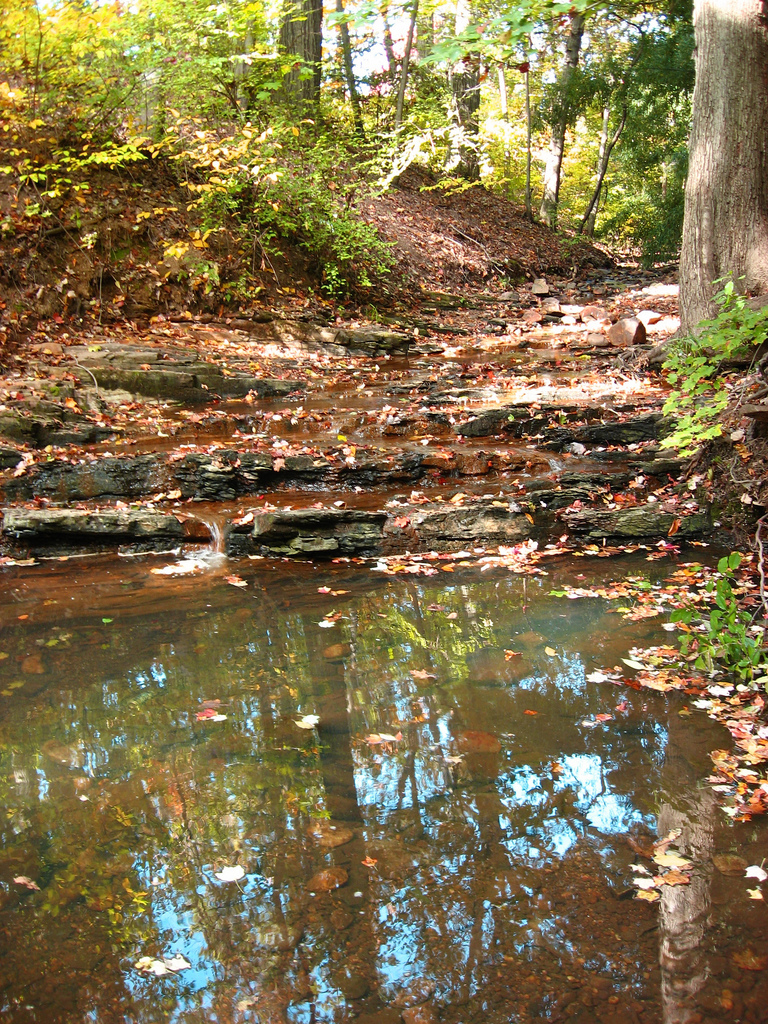
Stream in Rutgers Gardens

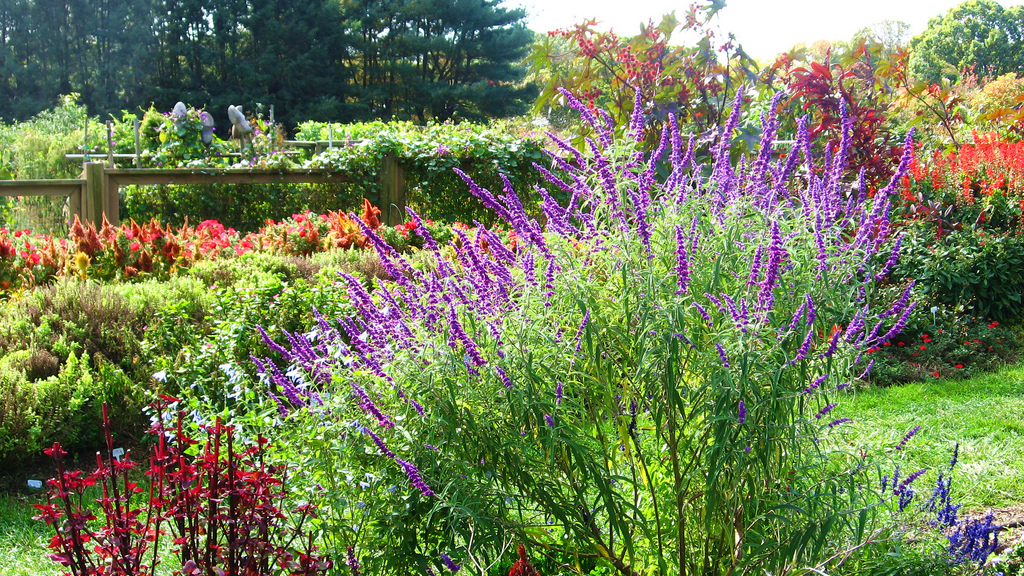
Rutgers Gardens late in the season

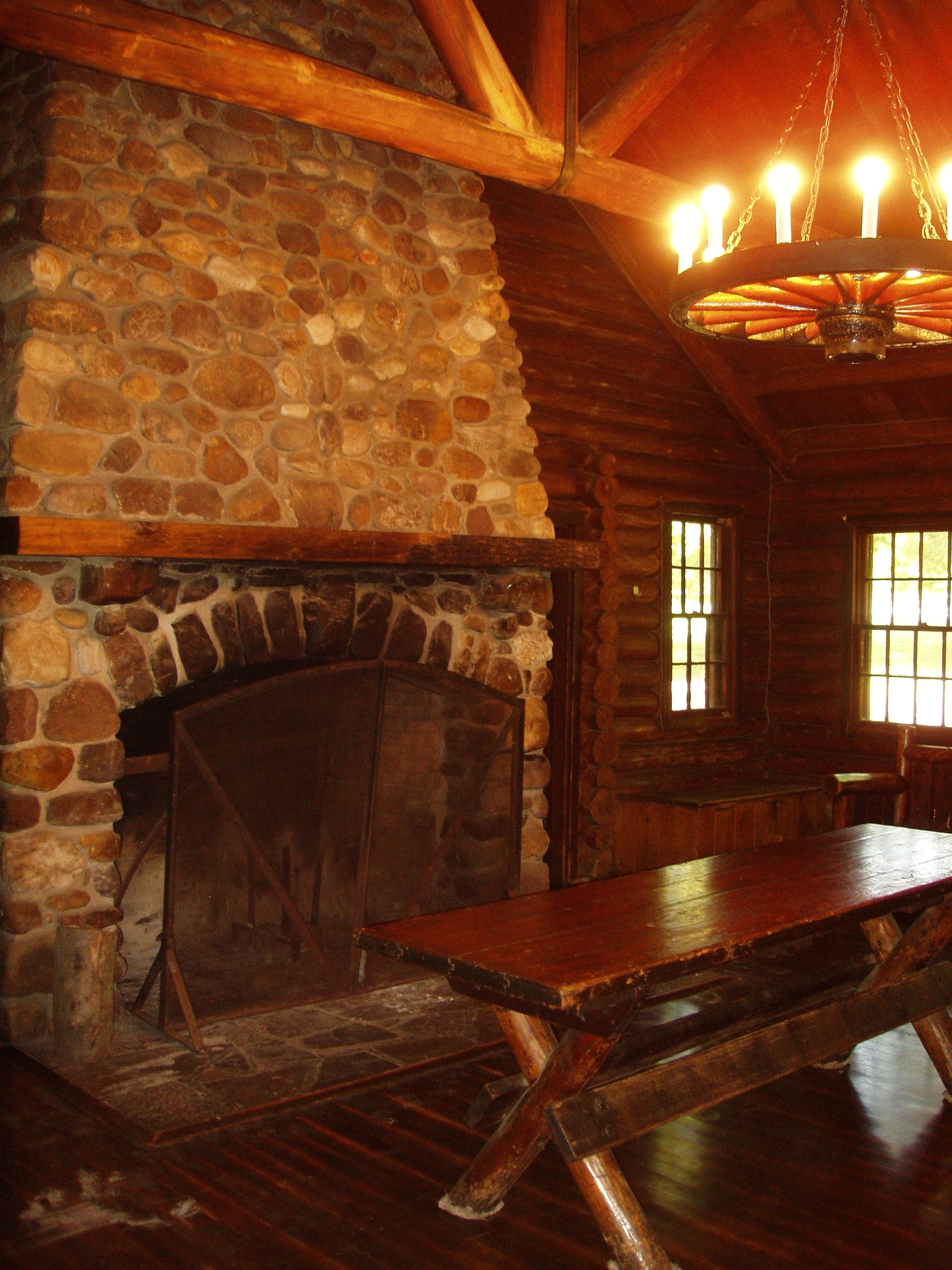
Log Cabin interior

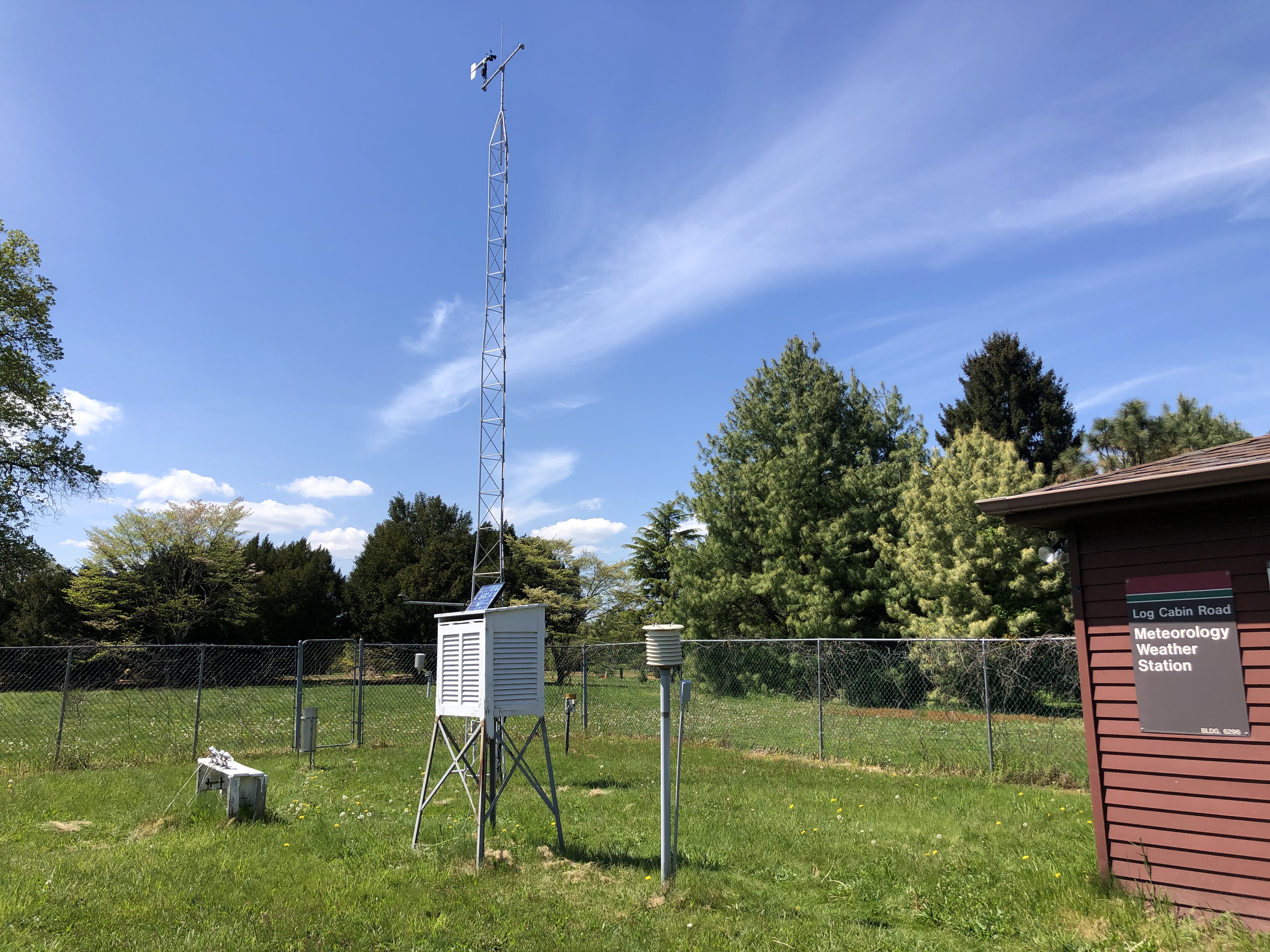
Meteorolgy Weather Station at the gardens.

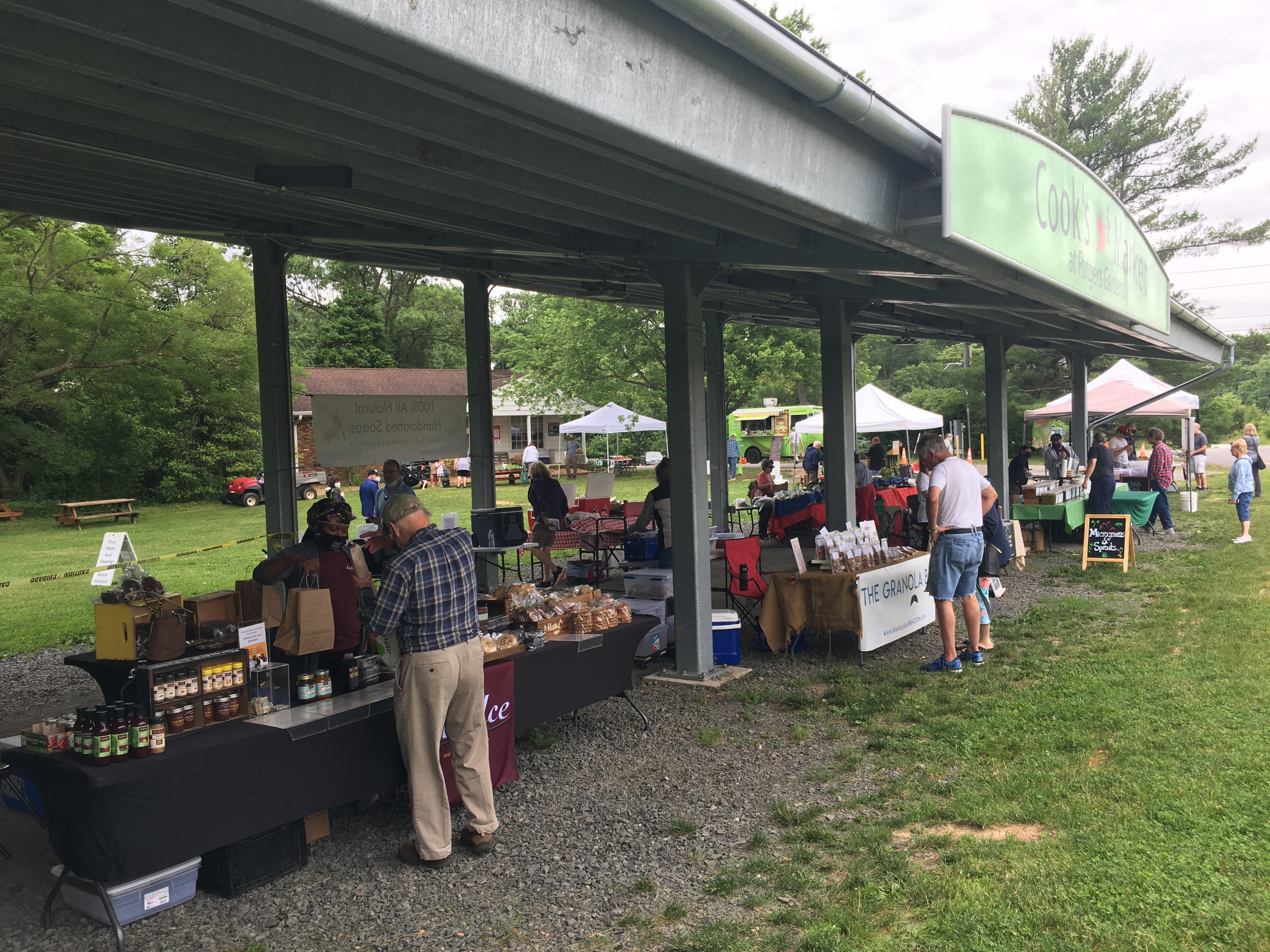
Cook's Market at the gardens.

== See also ==
- Lawrence Brook
- List of botanical gardens in the United States
