= Trinomial nomenclature =

System of naming taxonomic ranks below species

In biology, trinomial nomenclature is the system of names for taxa below the rank of species. These names have three parts. The usage is different in zoology and botany.

== In zoology ==
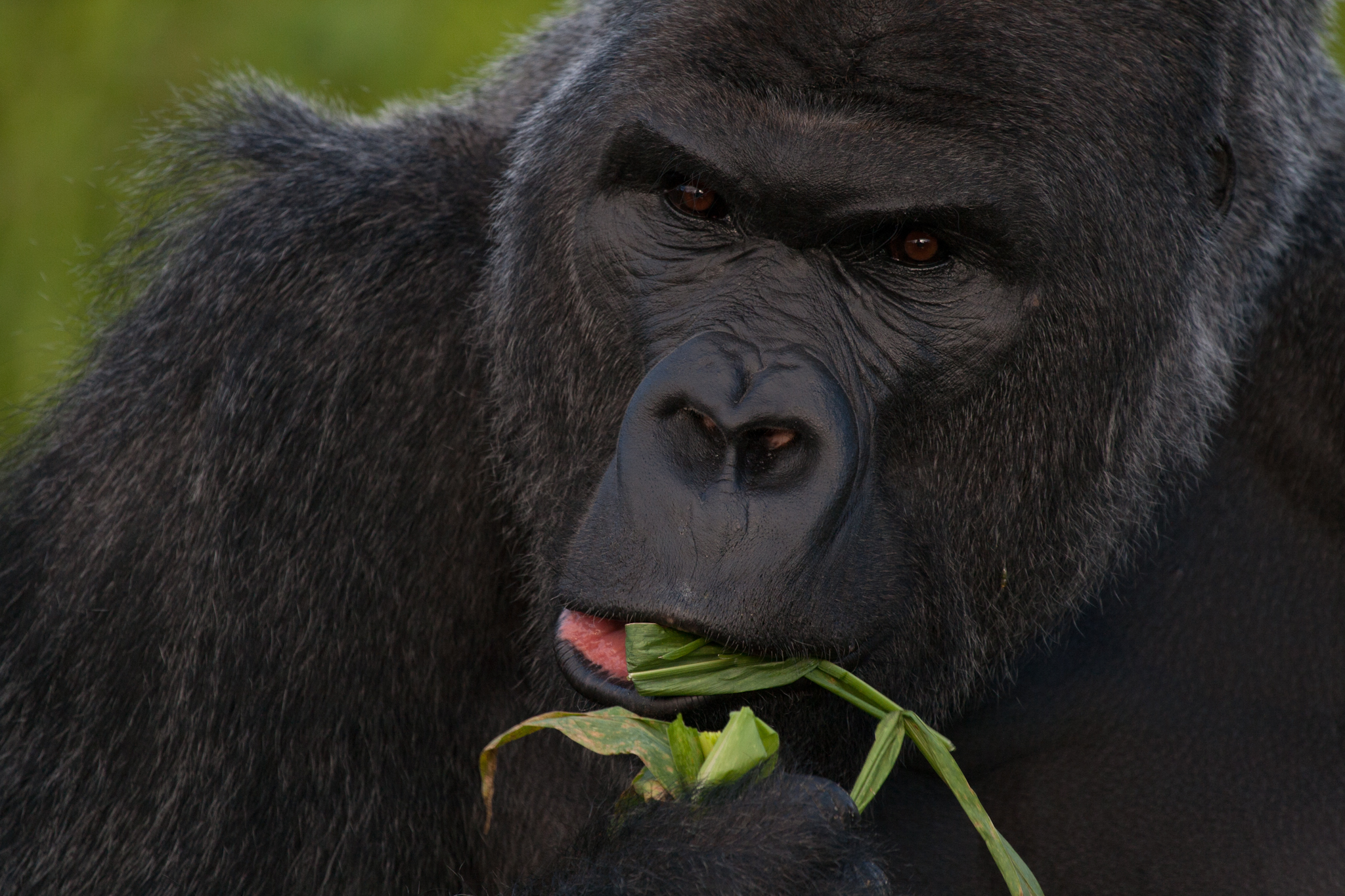
The trinomen of the critically endangered western lowland gorilla is Gorilla gorilla gorilla.

In zoological nomenclature, a trinomen (pl. trinomina), trinominal name, or ternary name is the name of a subspecies.

A trinomen is a name with three parts: generic name, specific name and subspecific name. The first two parts alone form the binomen or species name. All three names are typeset in italics, and only the first letter of the generic name is capitalised. No indicator of rank is included: in zoology, subspecies is the only rank below that of species. For example: "Buteo jamaicensis borealis is one of the subspecies of the red-tailed hawk (Buteo jamaicensis)."

Examples include Gorilla gorilla gorilla (Savage and Wyman, 1847) for the western lowland gorilla and Gorilla gorilla diehli (Matschie, 1903) for the Cross River gorilla (which are subspecies of Gorilla gorilla, the western gorilla); Bison bison bison (Linnaeus, 1758) for the plains bison and Bison bison athabascae (Rhoads, 1898) for the wood bison (which are subspecies of Bison bison, the American bison).

In a taxonomic publication, a name is incomplete without an author citation and publication details. This indicates who published the name, in what publication, and the date of the publication. For example: "Phalacrocorax carbo novaehollandiae (Stephens, 1826)" denotes a subspecies of the great cormorant (Phalacrocorax carbo) introduced by James Francis Stephens in 1826 under the subspecies name novaehollandiae ("of New Holland").

If the generic and specific name have already been mentioned in the same paragraph, they are often abbreviated to initial letters. For example, one might write: "The great cormorant Phalacrocorax carbo has a distinct subspecies in Australasia, the black shag P. c. novaehollandiae".

While binomial nomenclature came into being and immediately gained widespread acceptance in the mid-18th century, it was not until the early 20th century that the current unified standard of trinominal nomenclature was agreed upon. This became the standard mainly because of tireless promotion by Elliott Coues – even though trinomina in the modern usage were pioneered in 1828 by Carl Friedrich Bruch and around 1850 were widely used especially by Hermann Schlegel and John Cassin. As late as the 1930s, the use of trinomina was not fully established in all fields of zoology. Thus, when referring especially European works of the preceding era, the nomenclature used is usually not in accord with contemporary standards.

== In botany ==
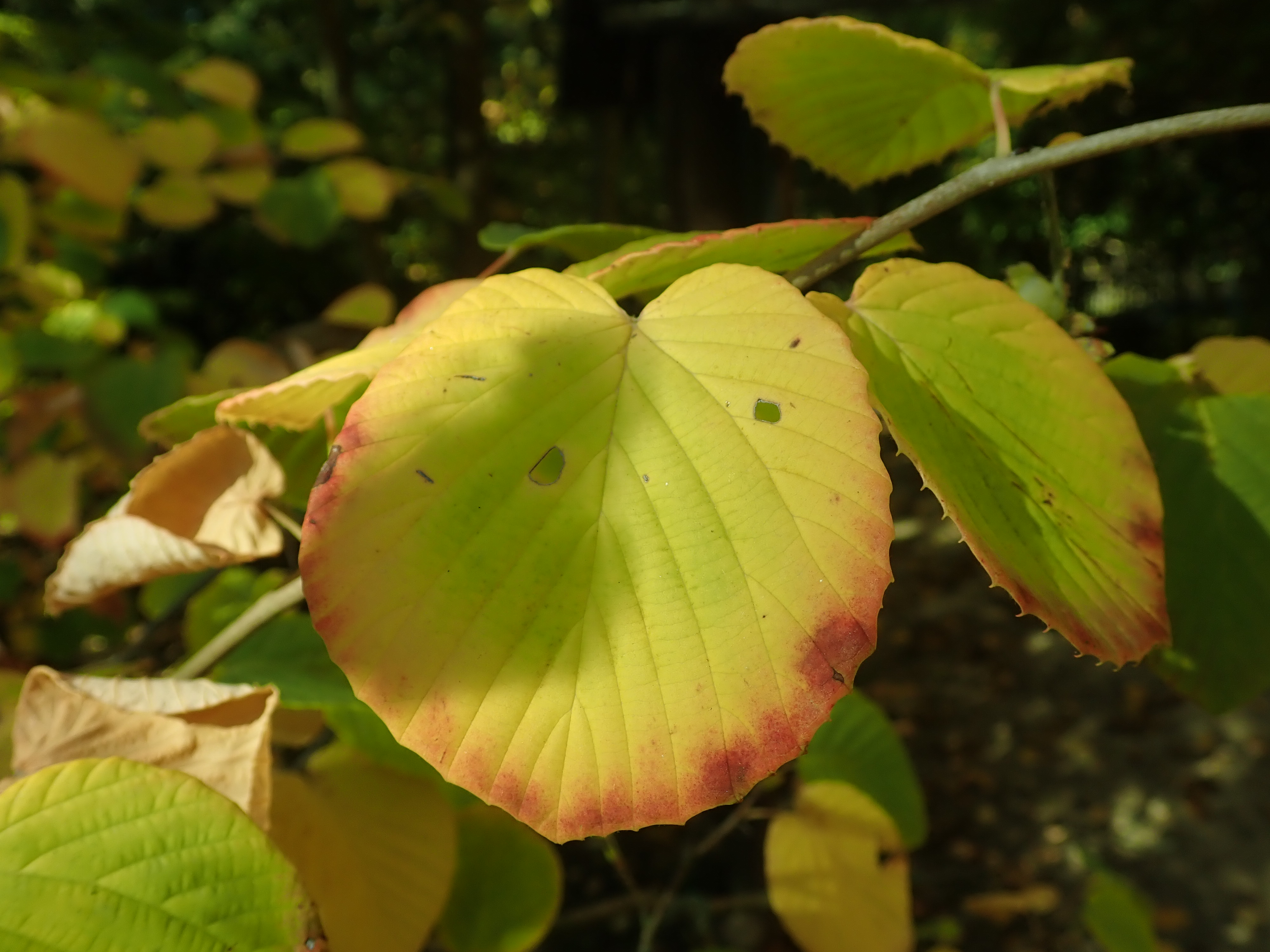
The trinominal name of this subspecies of the Chinese winter hazel is Corylopsis sinensis f. calvescens.

For algae, fungi, plants, and their fossils, there is an indeterminate number of infraspecific ranks allowed below the level of species. The secondary ranks below the species rank are variety and form, and more ranks can be made by using the prefix "sub" to make subspecies, subvariety, subform. Very rarely even more terms are created, such as supersubspecies. Not all of these ranks need to be specified, for example, some authors prefer to divide plant species into subspecies, while others prefer to use varieties.

These ranks are components of a biological classification, for example Corylopsis sinensis var. calvescens f. veitchiana is an ornamental garden plant. However, a name is not the same as a classification, and the name of this plant is a trinomial with only three parts, the two parts of the species name Corylopsis sinensis, plus the forma epithet veitchiana, to give Corylopsis sinensis f. veitchiana.

== See also ==
- Binomial nomenclature
- Nomenclature
