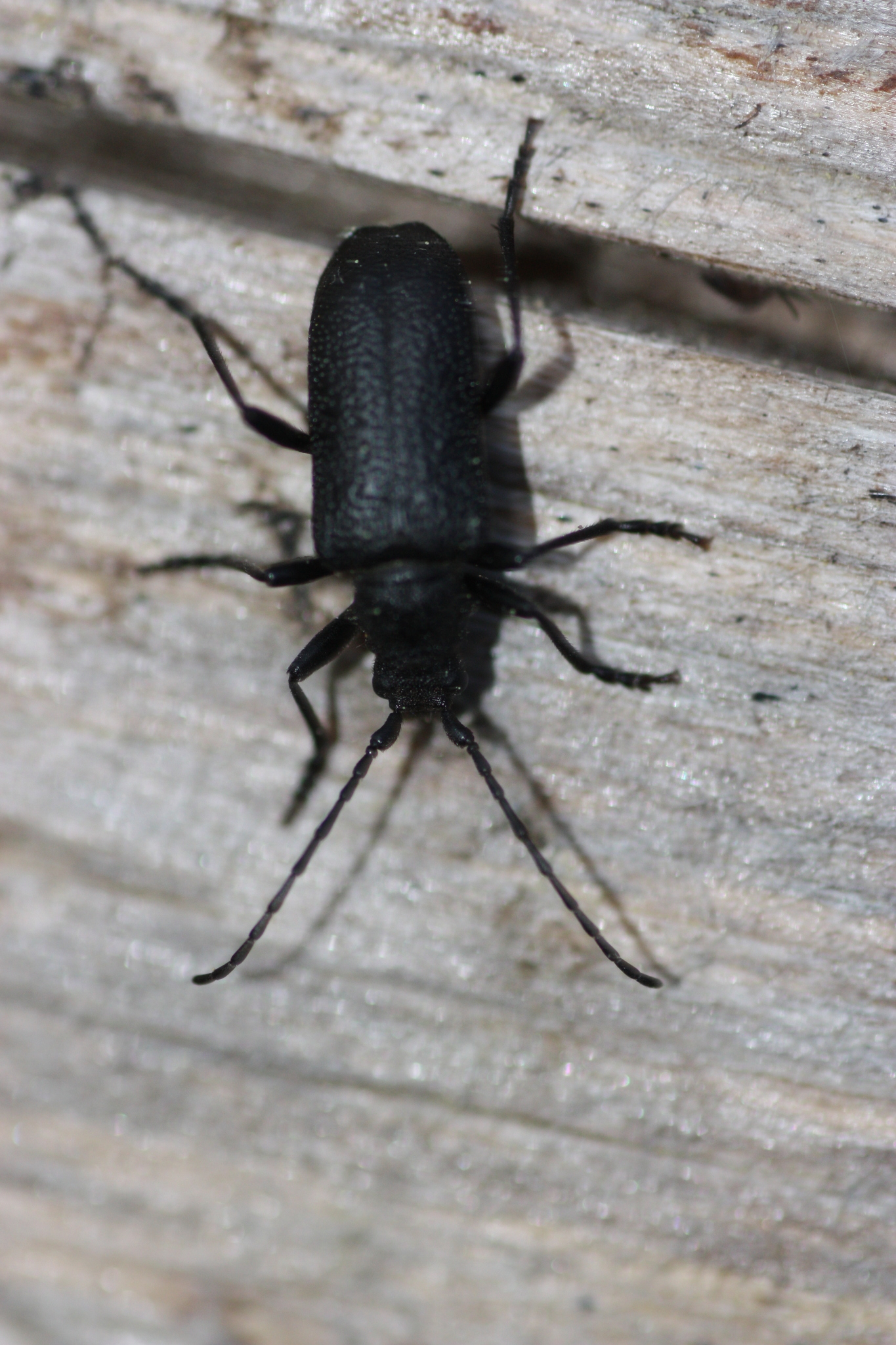
- Neanthophylax tenebrosus, Washington

Scientific classification
- Kingdom: Animalia
- Phylum: Arthropoda
- Class: Insecta
- Order: Coleoptera
- Suborder: Polyphaga
- Infraorder: Cucujiformia
- Family: Cerambycidae
- Subfamily: Lepturinae
- Tribe: Oxymirini
- Genus: Neanthophylax; Linsley & Chemsak, 1972

Synonyms
- Anthophilax Horn, 1890

= Neanthophylax =

Genus of beetles

Neanthophylax is a genus in the longhorn beetle family Cerambycidae. There are at least four described species in Neanthophylax.

== Species ==
These four species belong to the genus Neanthophylax:

- Neanthophylax mirificus (Bland, 1865) (Canada, Costa Rica, United States, and Mexico)
- Neanthophylax pubicollis Linsley & Chemsak, 1972 (United States)
- Neanthophylax subvittatus (Casey, 1891) (United States)
- Neanthophylax tenebrosus (LeConte, 1873) (United States)
