= Neanthophylax pubicollis =

Scientific classification
- Kingdom: Animalia
- Phylum: Arthropoda
- Class: Insecta
- Order: Coleoptera
- Suborder: Polyphaga
- Infraorder: Cucujiformia
- Family: Cerambycidae
- Subfamily: Lepturinae
- Tribe: Oxymirini
- Genus: Neanthophylax
- Species: N. pubicollis

Binomial name
- Neanthophylax pubicollis Linsley & Chemsak, 1972

Species of beetle

Neanthophylax pubicollis is a species of Long-Horned Beetle in the beetle family Cerambycidae. It is found in United States.
