= Neanthophylax subvittatus =

Scientific classification
- Kingdom: Animalia
- Phylum: Arthropoda
- Class: Insecta
- Order: Coleoptera
- Suborder: Polyphaga
- Infraorder: Cucujiformia
- Family: Cerambycidae
- Subfamily: Lepturinae
- Tribe: Oxymirini
- Genus: Neanthophylax
- Species: N. subvittatus

Binomial name
- Neanthophylax subvittatus (Casey, 1891)

Synonyms
- Anthophilax subvittata Casey, 1891; Anthophilax subvittatus Hopping, 1937; Anthophylax subvittatus Boppe, 1921

Species of beetle

Neanthophylax subvittatus is a species of Long-Horned Beetle in the beetle family Cerambycidae. It is found in United States.
