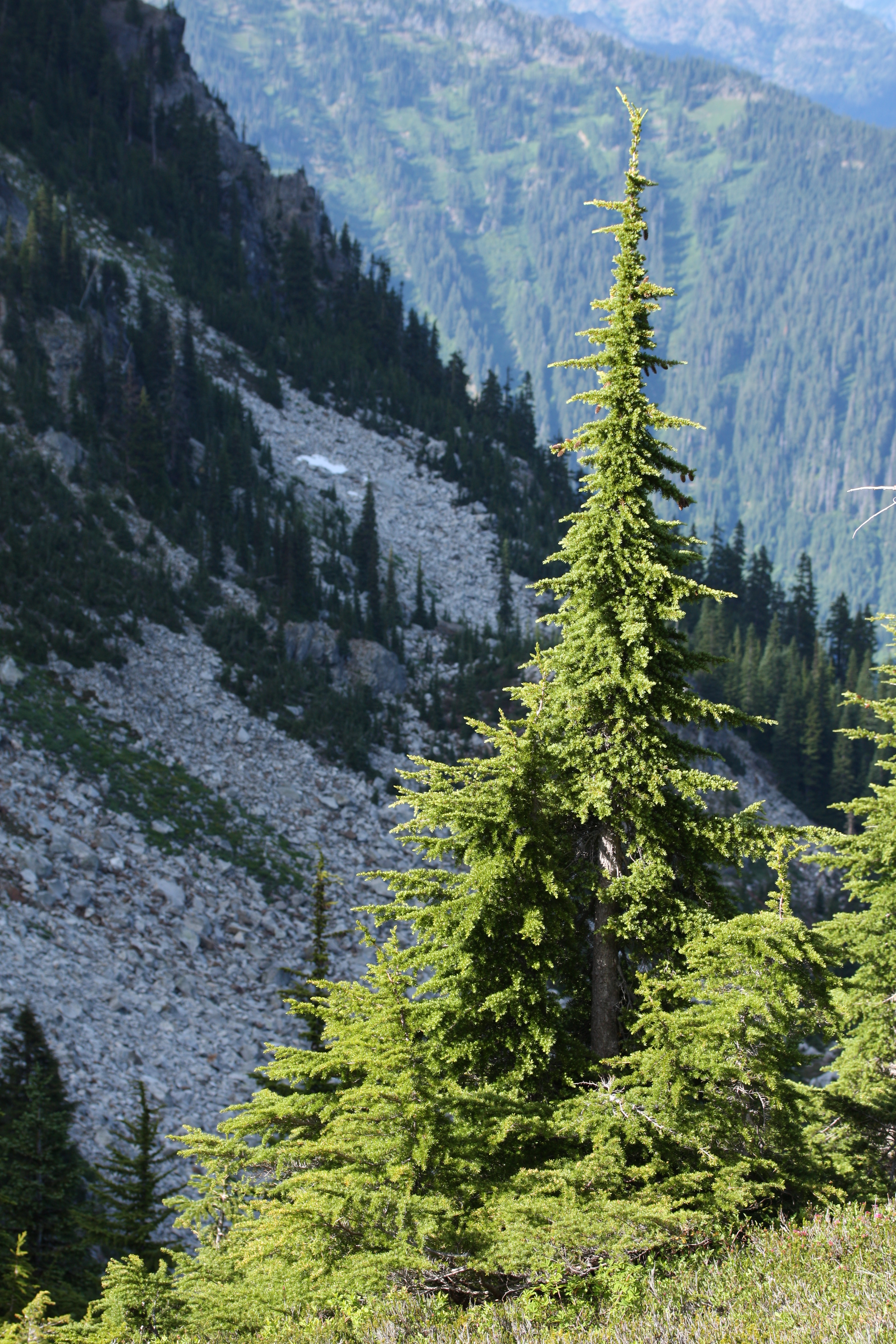
- Mountain hemlock in Henry M. Jackson Wilderness, Washington

Conservation status
- Least Concern (IUCN 3.1)

Scientific classification
- Kingdom: Plantae
- Clade: Tracheophytes
- Clade: Gymnosperms
- Division: Pinophyta
- Class: Pinopsida
- Order: Pinales
- Family: Pinaceae
- Genus: Tsuga
- Species: T. mertensiana

Binomial name
- Tsuga mertensiana (Bong.) Carr.
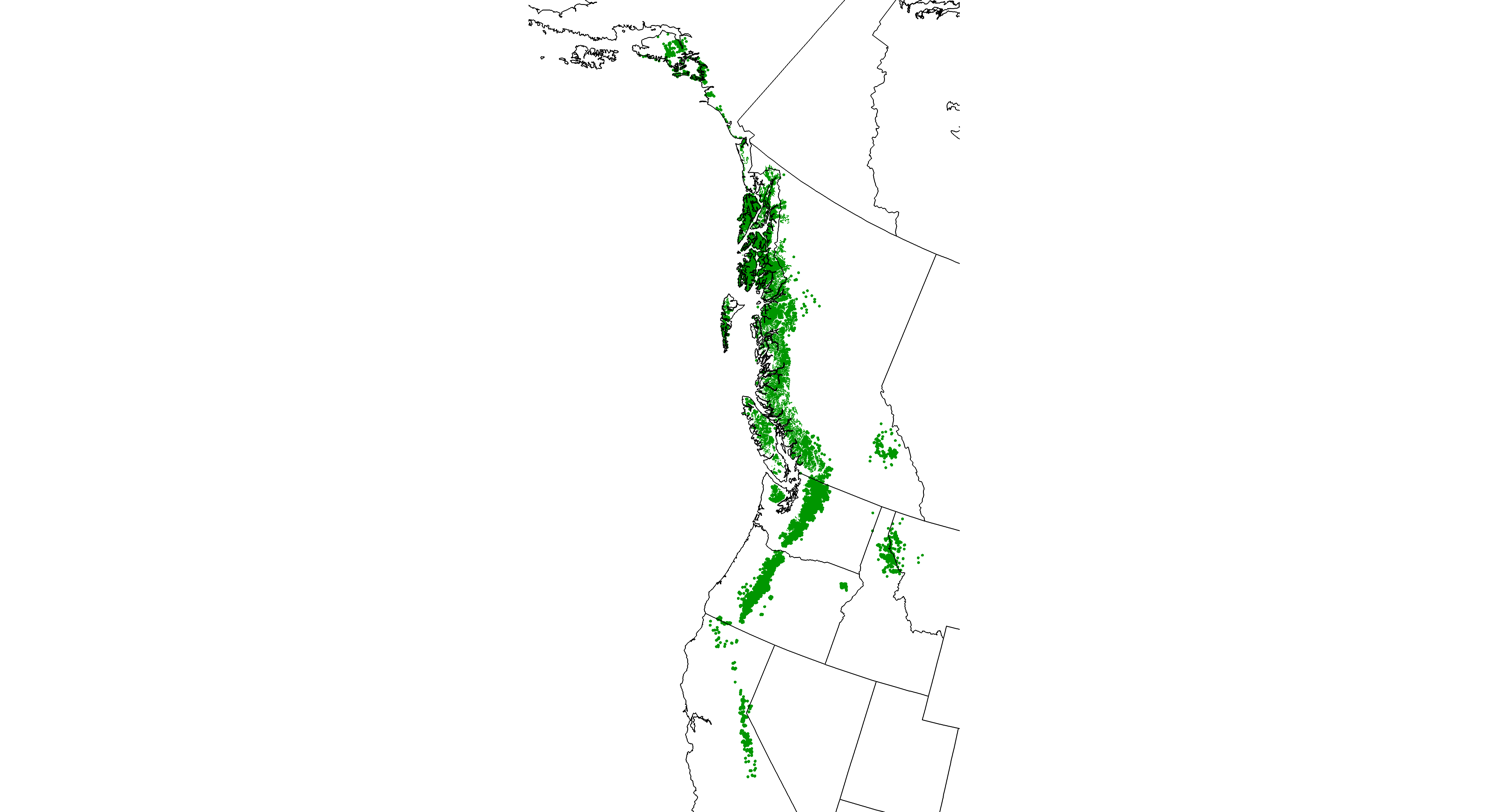
- Natural range

= Tsuga mertensiana =

Species of tree found in western North America

Tsuga mertensiana, known as mountain hemlock, is a species of conifer in the pine family, Pinaceae. It is native to the west coast of North America, found between Southcentral Alaska and south-central California.

== Description ==
Tsuga mertensiana is a large conifer growing up to 20 to 40 meters (66 to 131 feet) tall, with exceptional specimens as tall as 59 m (194 ft) tall. They have a trunk diameter of up to 2 m (6 1/2 ft). The bark is about 3 centimeters (1 1/4 inches) thick and square-cracked or furrowed, and purplish-brown to gray in color. The crown is a neat, slender, conic shape in young trees with a tilted or drooping lead shoot, becoming cylindric in older trees. At all ages, it is distinguished by the slightly pendulous branchlet tips. The shoots are orange–brown, with dense pubescence about 1 millimeter (1/16 in) long. The leaves are needle-like, 7 to 25 mm (1/4 to 1 in) long and 1 to 1.5 mm (1/32 to 1/16 in) broad, soft, blunt-tipped, only slightly flattened in cross-section, pale glaucous blue-green above, and with two broad bands of bluish-white stomata below with only a narrow green midrib between the bands; they differ from those of any other species of hemlock in also having stomata on the upper surface, and are arranged spirally all around the shoot.

The cones are small (but much longer than those of any other species of hemlock), pendulous, cylindrical, 3 to 8 cm (1 to 3 in) long and 8 to 10 mm (5/16 to 3/8 in) broad when closed, opening to 12 to 35 mm (1/2 to 1 3/8 in) broad, superficially somewhat like a small spruce cone. They have thin, flexible scales 8 to 18 mm (5/16 to 11/16 in) long. The immature cones are dark purple (rarely green), maturing red–brown 5 to 7 months after pollination. The seeds are red–brown, 2 to 3 mm (1/16 to 1/8 in) long, with a slender, 7 to 12 mm (1/4 to 1/2 in)-long pale pink–brown wing.

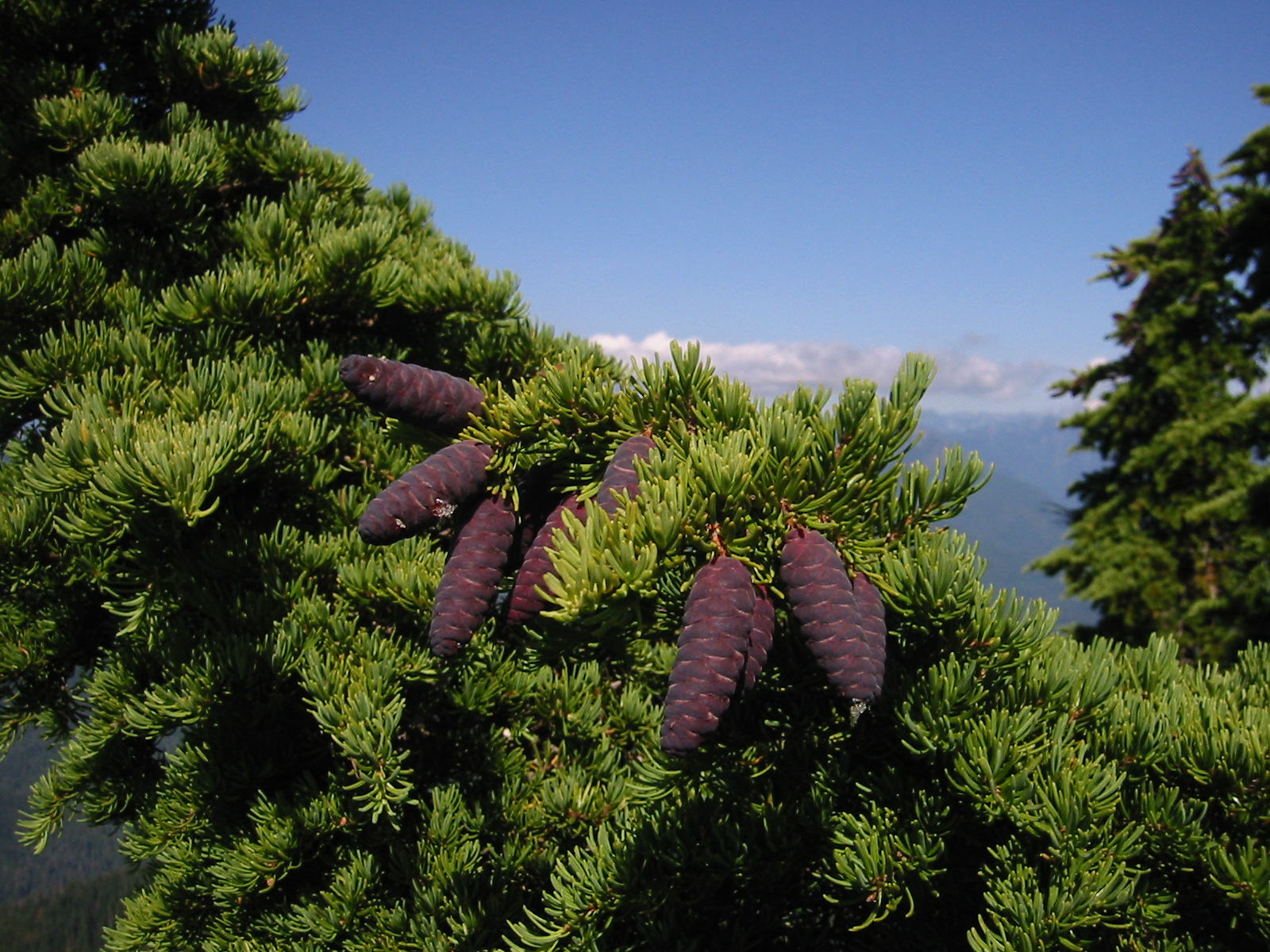
Foliage and cones of subsp. mertensiana

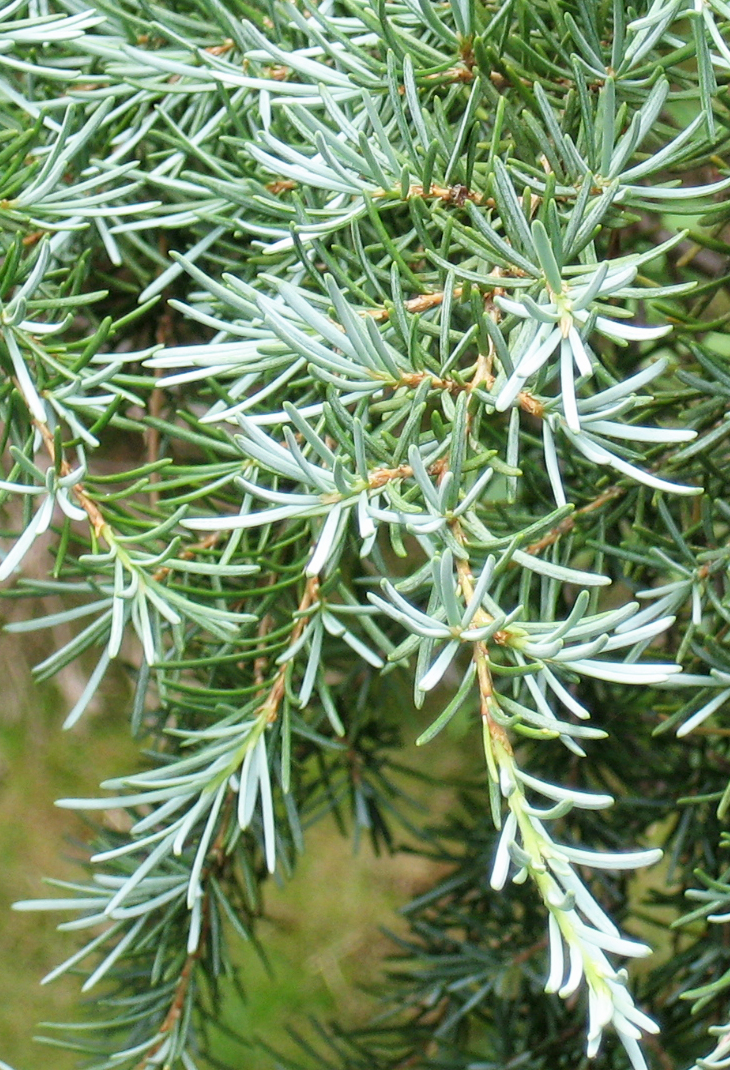
Foliage of subsp. grandicona

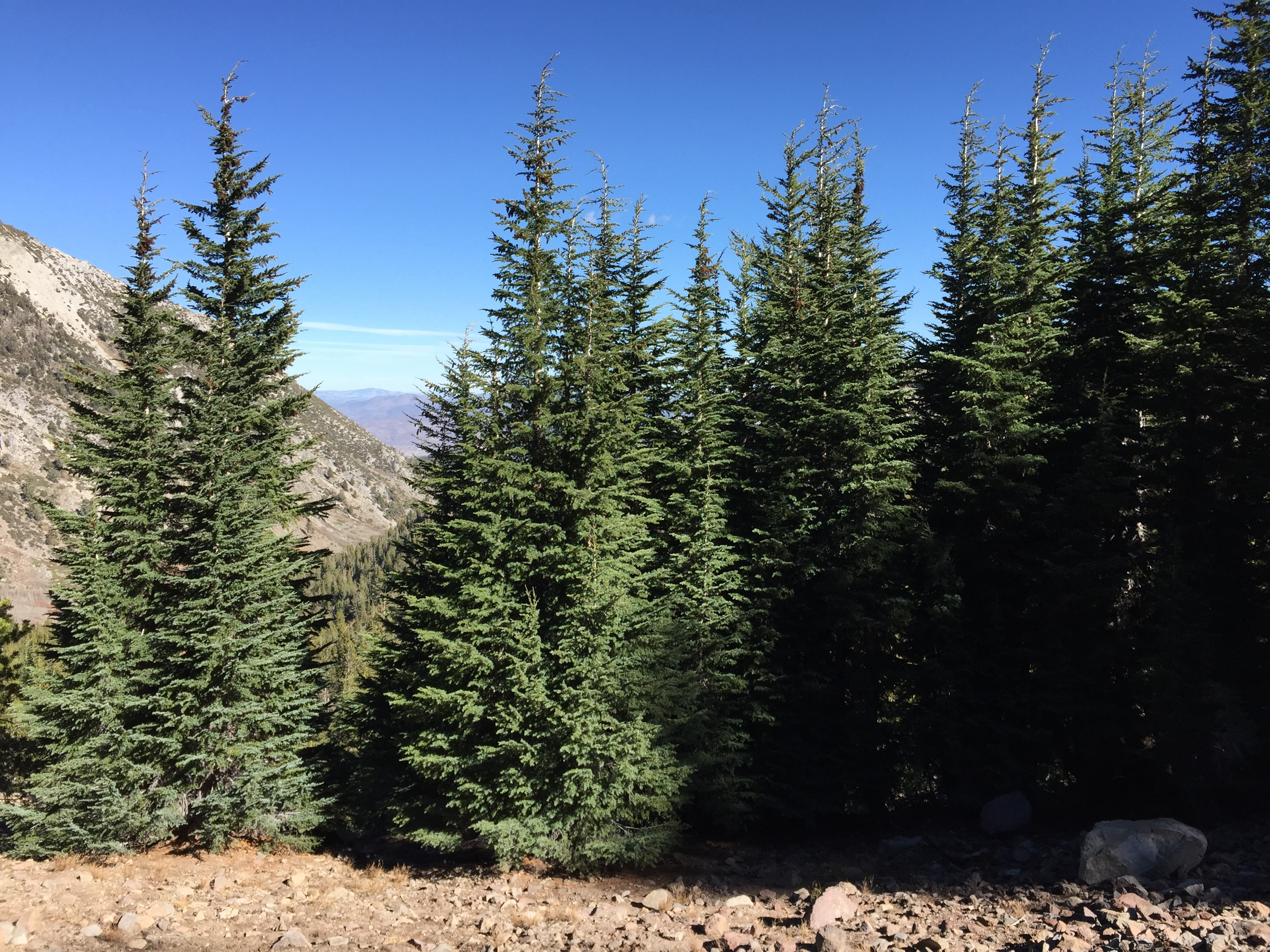
Grove of subsp. grandicona in the Carson Range of Nevada

== Taxonomy ==
There are three taxa, two subspecies and a minor variety:

- Tsuga mertensiana subsp. mertensiana. Northern mountain hemlock. Central Oregon northwards. Cones smaller, 30 to 60 mm (1 to 2 1/2 in) long, 12 to 25 mm (1/2 to 1 in) broad when open, with 50 to 80 scales.
  - Tsuga mertensiana subsp. mertensiana var. mertensiana. Northern mountain hemlock. Leaves gray-green on both sides.
  - Tsuga mertensiana subsp. mertensiana var. jeffreyi (Henry) Schneider. Jeffrey's mountain hemlock. Mixed with var. mertensiana; rare. Leaves greener, less glaucous above, paler below; cones indistinguishable from the type. At one time it was thought to be a hybrid with western hemlock, but there is no verified evidence for this.
- Tsuga mertensiana subsp. grandicona Farjon. California mountain hemlock; syn. T. hookeriana (A.Murray) Carrière, T. crassifolia Flous. Central Oregon southwards. Leaves very strongly glaucous. Cones larger, 45 to 80 mm (1 3/4 to 3 1/4 in) long, 20 to 35 mm (3/4 to 1 1/2 in) broad when open, with 40 to 60 scales.

=== Etymology ===
The species name mertensiana refers to Karl Heinrich Mertens (1796–1830), a German botanist who collected the first specimens as a member of a Russian expedition in 1826–1829.

== Distribution ==
The distribution of T. mertensiana stretches from Kenai Peninsula, Alaska, to northern Tulare County, California. Its range fairly closely matches that of T. heterophylla (western hemlock), found less than 100 kilometers (62 miles) from the Pacific Ocean, apart from an inland population in the Rocky Mountains in southeast British Columbia, northern Idaho, and western Montana. The inland populations most likely established after deglaciation by remarkable long-distance dispersal of more than 200 km (120 mi) from the coast populations. Their ranges differ in California, where western hemlock is restricted to the Coast Ranges and mountain hemlock is found in the Klamath Mountains and Sierra Nevada. Unlike western hemlock, mountain hemlock mostly grows at high altitudes except in the far north, from sea level to 1,000 m (3,300 ft) in Alaska, 1,600 to 2,300 m (5,200 to 7,500 ft) in the Cascades in Oregon, and 2,500 to 3,050 m (8,200 to 10,010 ft) in the Sierra Nevada.

== Ecology ==
Mountain hemlock is usually found on cold, snowy subalpine sites where it grows slowly, sometimes attaining more than 800 years in age. Arborescent individuals that have narrowly conical crowns until old age (300 to 400 years) and shrubby krummholz on cold, windy sites near timberline add beauty to mountain landscapes. Areas occupied by mountain hemlock generally have a cool to cold maritime climate that includes mild to cold winters, a short, warm-to-cool growing season and moderate to high precipitation.

Best development of mountain hemlock is on loose, coarse-textured, well-drained soils with adequate moisture, and in British Columbia, on thick and very acidic organic matter and decayed wood. Adequate soil moisture appears to be especially important in California and Montana, where summer drought is most pronounced.

Mountain hemlock will grow on most landforms, but individuals typically develop best in mixed stands of forest on sheltered slopes or in draws. From southern British Columbia south, the tree grows better on northerly exposures. The preference for relatively moist, cool sites evidently becomes a necessity as the climate becomes more continental in western Montana and more mediterranean in the central Sierra Nevada at these extremes of its range. In these locations, mountain hemlock typically grows in isolated populations in north-facing glens and cirque basins where snow collects and may remain well into summer.

Mountain hemlock is adapted to sites with long-lasting snowpacks. In the spring, mountain hemlocks emerging through 2 to 4 m (6 1/2 to 13 ft) of snow were transpiring, whereas nearby whitebark pines did not transpire until the soil beneath them was free of snow. Mountain hemlock is well adapted to cope with heavy snow and ice loads, with tough branches and the drooping branchlets shedding snow readily.

Mountain hemlock is tolerant of shade and other forms of competition. It is more shade-tolerant than all of its associates except Pacific silver fir, western hemlock, and Alaska cedar. Mountain hemlock is considered a minor climax species on most of its habitats, and pioneers on glacial moraines in British Columbia and Alaska. In many communities of the mountain hemlock forest in British Columbia and Washington and northern Oregon, Pacific silver fir is a major climax species. Alaska cedar, western redcedar, and western hemlock are climax associates on some sites. Mountain hemlock is more commonly the major climax species in the mountain hemlock zone south of central Oregon where Pacific silver fir does not occur.

Mountain hemlock often succeeds lodgepole pine or subalpine fir when these species pioneer on drier sites. It also tends to replace Engelmann spruce when the two species occur together, possibly because hemlock is better able to withstand the allelopathic effects of spruce than are other associated species.

The species is attacked by the root rot Phellinus weirii. Stands lost to fire can be populated by lodgepole pine, which is in turn succeeded by mountain hemlock.

== Uses ==
Native Americans used the species less often than western hemlock, but specifically used mountain hemlock boughs as beds and bathing brushes.

Since the mid-20th century, the species has been used for lumber, often mixed with western hemlock.

=== Cultivation ===
Outside of its native range, mountain hemlock is grown as an ornamental tree. It was described by John Muir as "the most singularly beautiful of all the California coniferae". It is planted as a specimen tree in native plant landscapes in California, and particularly in gardens in northern Great Britain and Scandinavia, where it is appreciated for its blue–green color and tolerance of severe weather. Cultivation is limited by the very slow growth of young plants and its susceptibility to urban air pollution.

Several cultivars have been selected, mainly for intensely glaucous foliage color including:

- 'Blue Star'
- 'Glauca'
