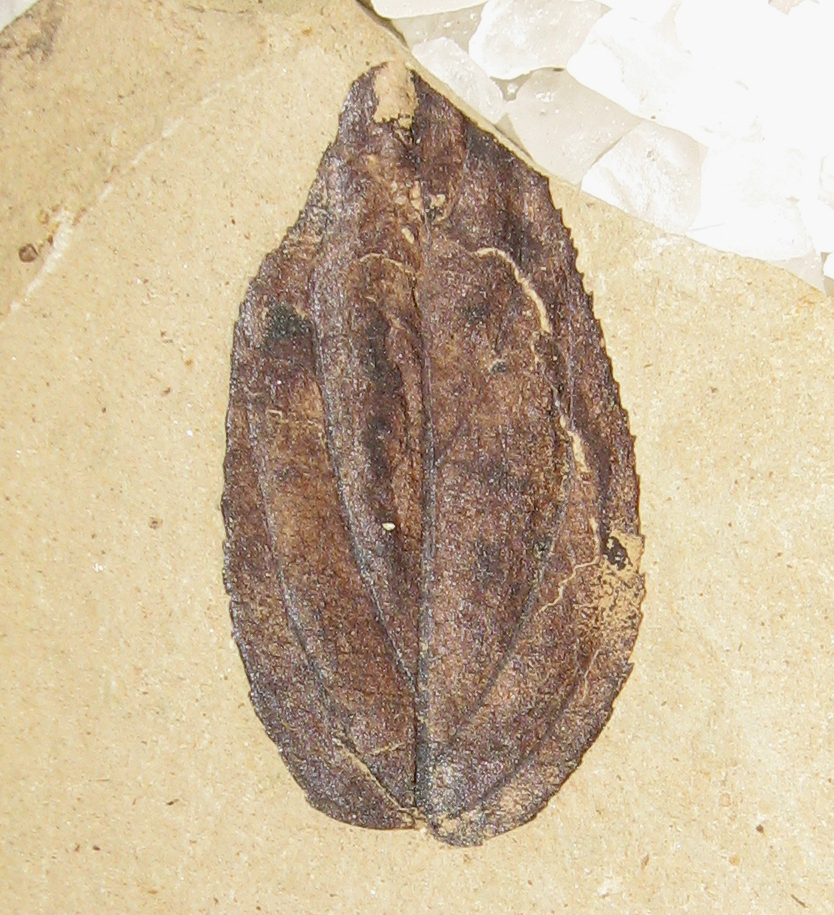
- C. readae fossil leaf

Scientific classification
- Kingdom: Plantae
- Clade: Tracheophytes
- Clade: Angiosperms
- Clade: Eudicots
- Order: Saxifragales
- Family: Hamamelidaceae
- Genus: Corylopsis
- Species: C. reedae

Binomial name
- Corylopsis reedae Radtke, Pigg, & Wehr, 2005

= Corylopsis reedae =

Corylopsis reedae Temporal range: Ypresian 49.5 Ma

Extinct species of flowering plant

Corylopsis reedae is an extinct species of flowering plant in the family Hamamelidaceae known from fossil leaves found in the early Eocene Klondike Mountain Formation deposits of northern Washington state. C. readae is one of the oldest occurrences of the winter-hazel genus Corylopsis, which includes between seven and thirty species, all found in Asia. Fossils from two other occurrences are of similar age to C. readae, with Paleocene specimens from Greenland being placed in the form taxon Corylopsiphyllum and an Eocene Alaskan fossil being included in Corylopsis without species placement.

== History and classification ==
Corylopsis reedae is represented by a single counterpart compression fossil specimen from the Ypresian-aged Klondike Mountain Formation that outcrops in Republic, Ferry County, Washington. The age of the formation is based on Argon–argon dating, which has returned a date of 49.4 ±0.5 million years old. The fossil was recovered from the "Corner lot", University of Washington site UWBM A0307, located within the city limits of Republic.

The holotype specimen for Corylopsis reedae is numbered UWBM 71085 and currently preserved in the paleobotanical collections of University of Washington in Seattle, Washington. The specimen was studied by paleobotanists Meghan G. Radtke and Kathleen B. Pigg of the School of Life Sciences, Arizona State University, and Wesley C. Wehr of the Burke Museum of Natural History and Culture in Seattle. Radtke, Pigg and Wehr published their 2005 type description for C. readae in the International Journal of Plant Sciences. The etymology of the specific name readae was derived from Katherine ("Kitty") M. Reed in honor of her contributions to the Tertiary stratigraphy and paleontology of the Pacific northwest.

== Description ==
The specimen used for the description of C. readae is an incomplete simple, elliptical leaf. The preserved section of leaf is 3.4 centimetres (1.3 in) long with the overall length estimated to have been approximately 4 centimetres (1.6 in) and is 1.9 centimetres (0.75 in) at the widest point. The base of the specimen is slightly asymmetric with a 102° angle, also slightly obtuse. The pinnate secondary veins diverge from the primary vein at an angles ranging from 18° near the base to 13°-14° nearing the center area of the leaf. They form a craspedodromous pattern with the secondaries alternating along the primary vein. The basal most secondary veins produce numerous compound agrophic veins. The preserved teeth on the fossil show simple teeth with straight bases and concave apexes, though due to the lack of full teeth the overall length of the teeth is not known.
