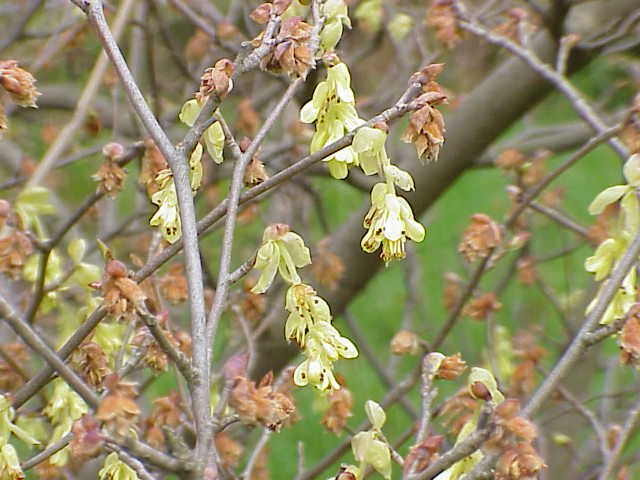
- Corylopsis spicata in flower

Scientific classification
- Kingdom: Plantae
- Clade: Embryophytes
- Clade: Tracheophytes
- Clade: Spermatophytes
- Clade: Angiosperms
- Clade: Eudicots
- Order: Saxifragales
- Family: Hamamelidaceae
- Subfamily: Hamamelidoideae
- Tribe: Corylopsideae; Harms
- Genus: Corylopsis; Siebold & Zucc.

= Corylopsis =

Genus of flowering plants

Corylopsis is a genus of 25 species of shrubs in the witch hazel family, Hamamelidaceae, native to eastern Asia with the majority of species endemic to China but with some also in Japan, Korea, and the Himalayas. This genus is also known from the extinct species Corylopsis reedae described from Eocene leaf fossils found in Washington State, USA.

They grow to 2–6 m (6 ft 7 in – 19 ft 8 in) tall, often with a crown wider than the shrub's height. The leaves are ovate with an acute apex and a serrated margin, 4–20 cm (2–8 in) long and 3–15 cm (1.2–5.9 in) broad. The flowers are produced in late winter in pendulous racemes 3–9 cm (1.2–3.5 in) long with 5-30 flowers; each flower has five pale yellow petals, 4–9 mm long. The fruit is a dry capsule 10–12 mm long, containing two glossy black seeds.

== Species ==
25 species are accepted.

- Corylopsis alnifolia (H.Lév.) C.K.Schneid. – China (Guizhou)
- Corylopsis brevistyla H.T.Chang – China (Yunnan)
- Corylopsis calcicola C.Y.Wu – China (Yunnan)
- Corylopsis coreana Uyeki – central and southern Korea
- Corylopsis glabrescens Franch. & Sav. – Japan
- Corylopsis glandulifera Hemsl. – China (Anhui, Jiangxi, and Zhejiang)
- Corylopsis glaucescens Hand.-Mazz. – China (Yunnan)
- Corylopsis gotoana Makino – Japan
- Corylopsis henryi Hemsl. – China (Sichuan and Hubei)
- Corylopsis himalayana Griff. – Himalaya
- Corylopsis microcarpa H.T.Chang – China (Gansu and Sichuan)
- Corylopsis multiflora Hance – China and Taiwan
- Corylopsis obovata H.T.Chang – China (Chongqing and Guizhou)
- Corylopsis omeiensis W.C.Cheng – China (Sichuan and Guizhou)
- Corylopsis pauciflora Siebold & Zucc. – Korea, Japan, and Taiwan
- Corylopsis platypetala Rehder & E.H.Wilson – China (Sichuan, Hubei, and Anhui)
- †Corylopsis reedae Radtke, Pigg, & Wehr – extinct, Ypresian, Washington State
- Corylopsis rotundifolia H.T.Chang – China (Chongqing and Guizhou)
- Corylopsis sinensis Hemsl. – southern China
- Corylopsis spicata Siebold & Zucc. – Japan
- Corylopsis trabeculosa Hu & W.C.Cheng – China (Yunnan)
- Corylopsis veitchiana Bean – China (Sichuan, Hubei, and Anhui)
- Corylopsis velutina Hand.-Mazz. – China (Sichuan)
- Corylopsis willmottiae Rehder & E.H.Wilson – China (Sichuan)
- Corylopsis yui Hu & W.C.Cheng – China (Yunnan)
- Corylopsis yunnanensis Diels – China (Yunnan)
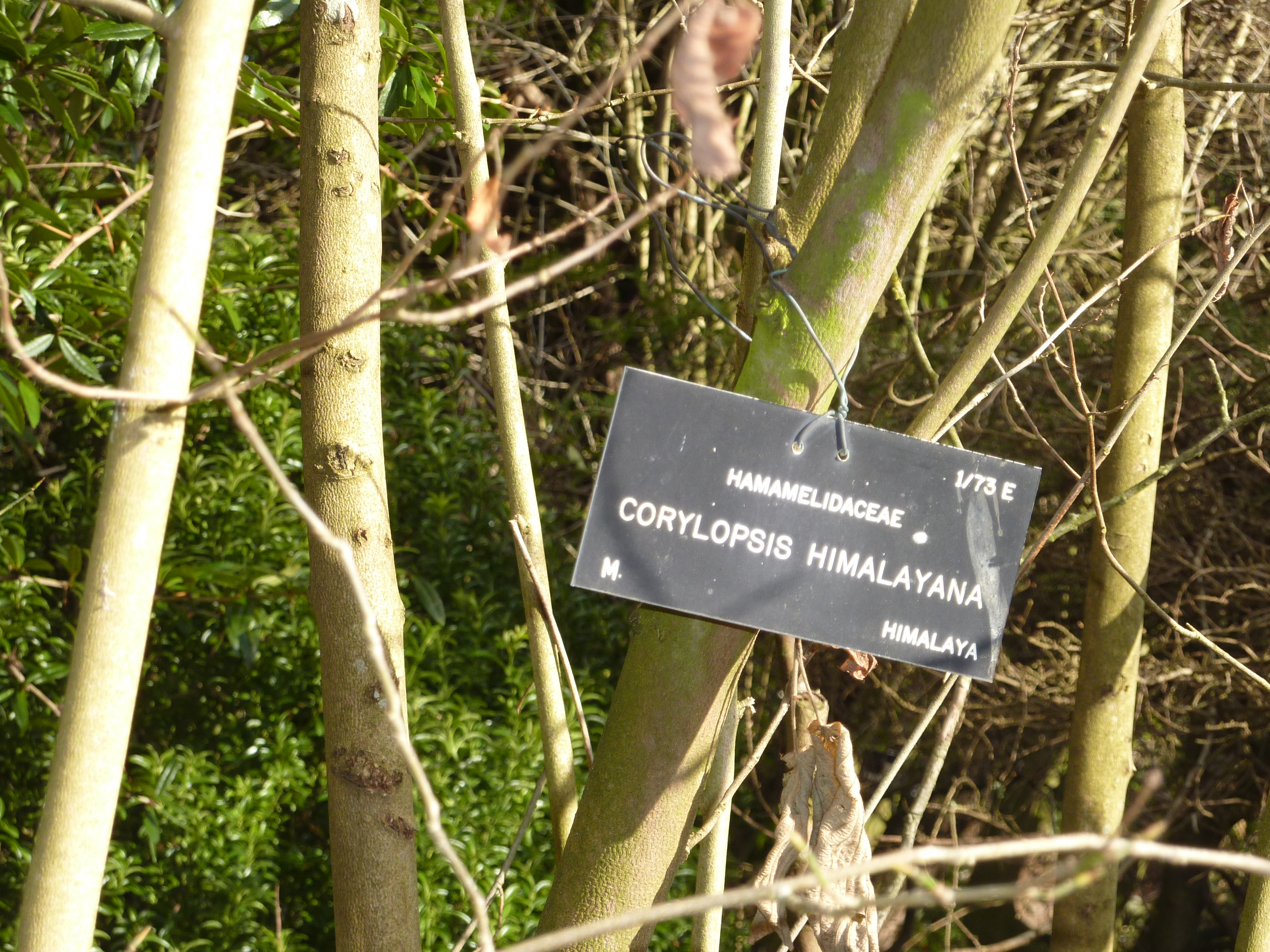
Corylopsis himalayana, National Botanic Gardens (Ireland)

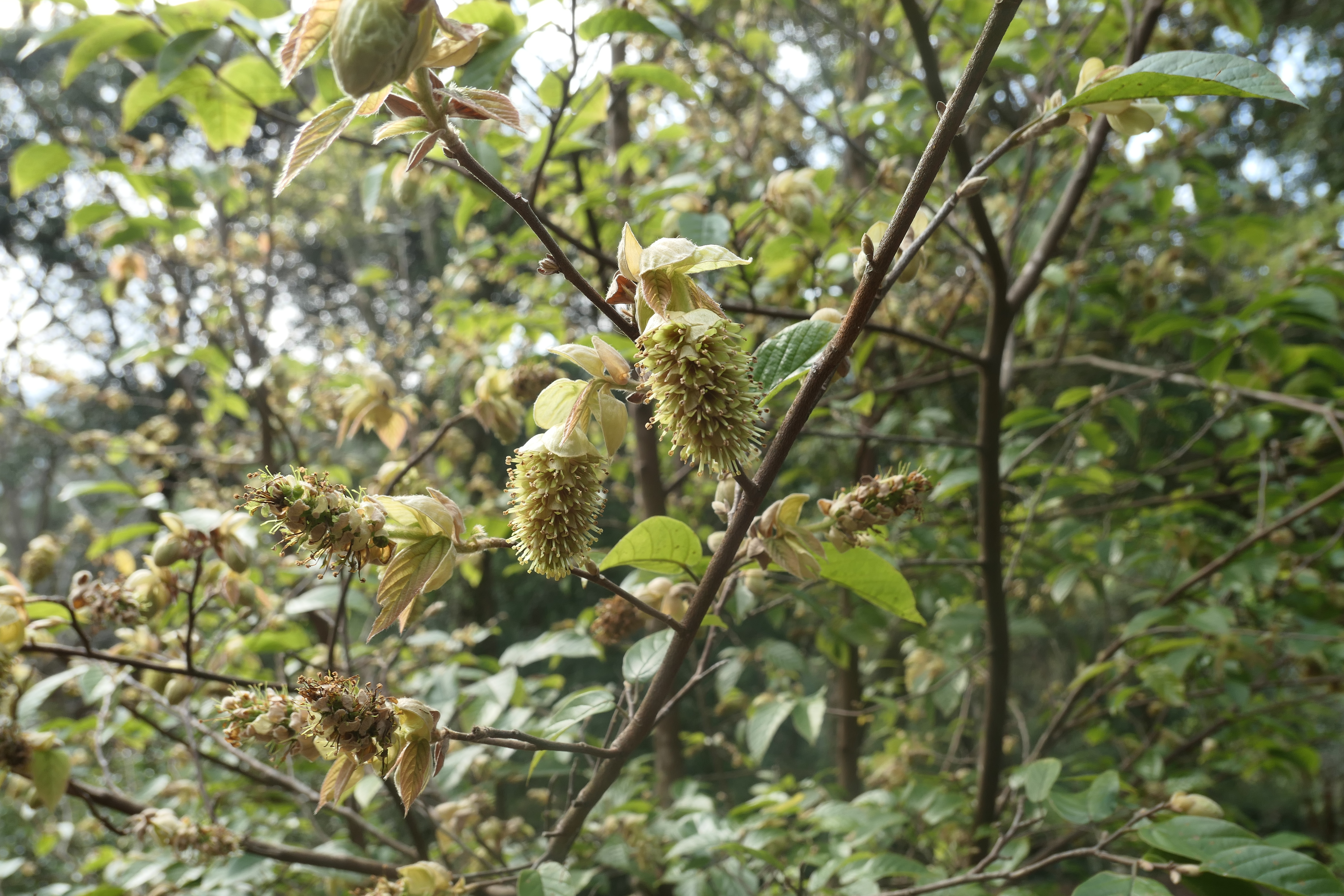
Corylopsis multiflora

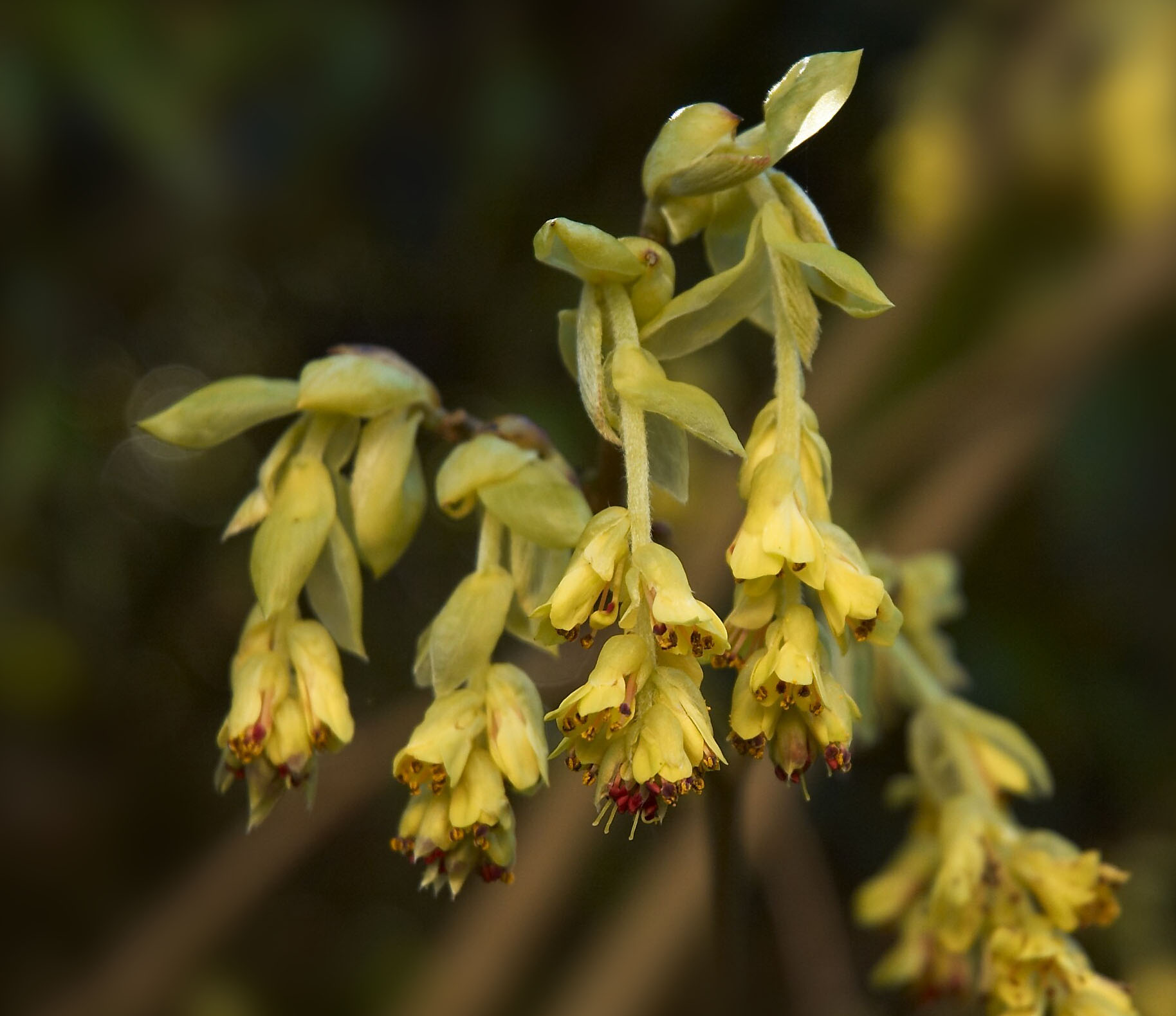
Corylopsis pauciflora

== Cultivation and uses ==
They are often grown in gardens for their very early, yellow flowers. They do have weak branches though, which are often damaged by heavy snow loads. Corylopsis prefers to grow in semi-shade or shade, protected from strong winds. It grows best on humus-rich soils. The sweetly scented flowering branches keep well in a vase. Corylopsis also makes good bonsai plants, especially C. pauciflora.
