= Neanthophylax mirificus =

Scientific classification
- Kingdom: Animalia
- Phylum: Arthropoda
- Class: Insecta
- Order: Coleoptera
- Suborder: Polyphaga
- Infraorder: Cucujiformia
- Family: Cerambycidae
- Subfamily: Lepturinae
- Tribe: Oxymirini
- Genus: Neanthophylax
- Species: N. mirificus

Binomial name
- Neanthophylax mirificus (Bland, 1865)

Synonyms
- Anthophilax mirificus LeConte, 1873; Anthophylax mirifica Blackwelder, 1946; Anthophylax mirificus Boppe, 1921; Anthophylax venustus Gemminger & Harold, 1872; Neanthophylax costaricensis (Bates, 1885); Neanthophylax venustus (Bland, 1865); Pachyta costaricensis Bates, 1885

Species of beetle

Neanthophylax mirificus is a species of Long-Horned Beetle in the beetle family Cerambycidae. It is found in North America, Costa Rica, and Mexico.
