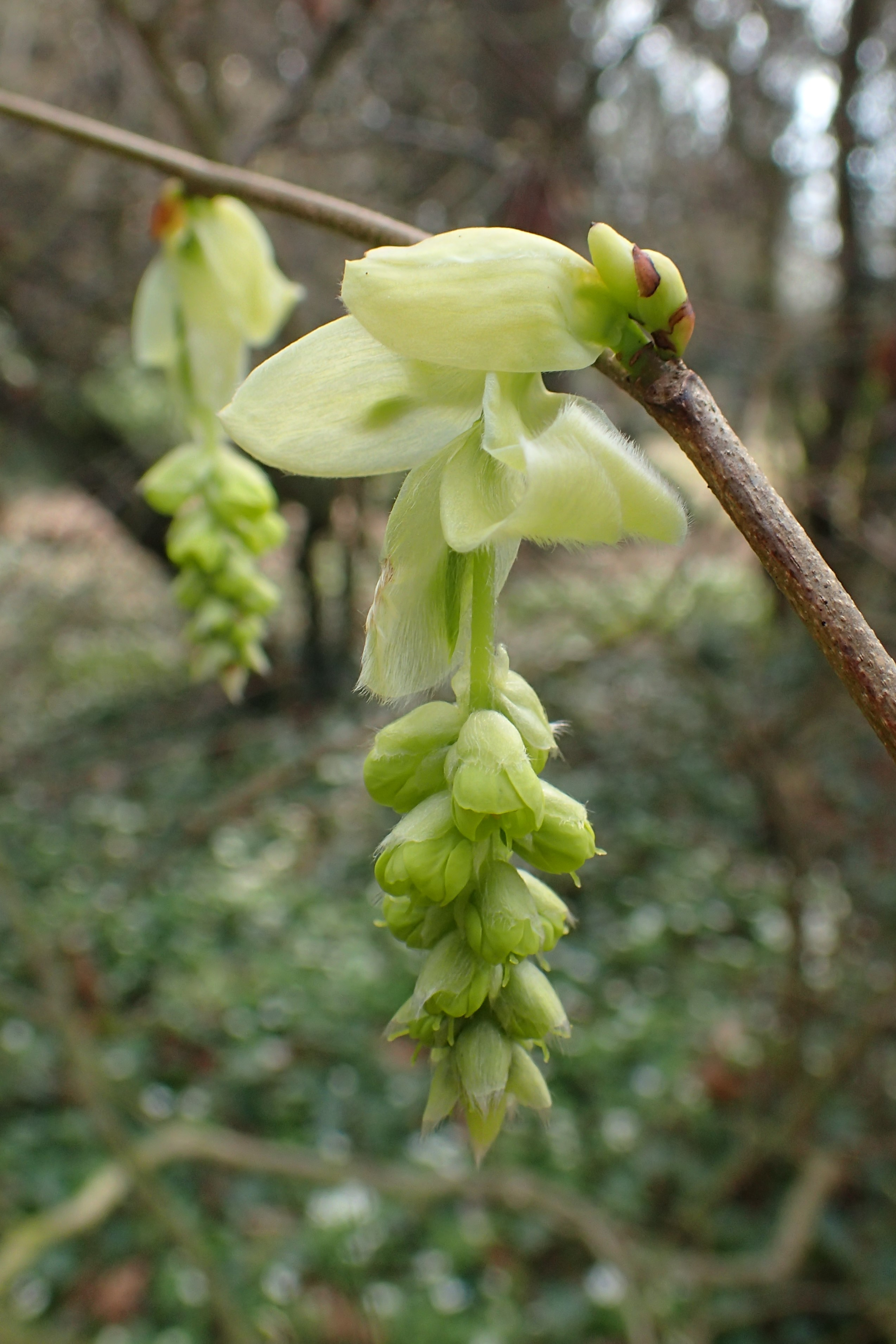

Scientific classification
- Kingdom: Plantae
- Clade: Tracheophytes
- Clade: Angiosperms
- Clade: Eudicots
- Order: Saxifragales
- Family: Hamamelidaceae
- Genus: Corylopsis
- Species: C. sinensis

Binomial name
- Corylopsis sinensis Hemsl.

= Corylopsis sinensis =

Species of flowering plant

Corylopsis sinensis, the Chinese winter hazel (simplified Chinese: 蜡瓣花; traditional Chinese: 蠟瓣花; pinyin: là bàn huā), is a species of flowering plant in the witch-hazel family Hamamelidaceae that is native to western China. Growing to 4 m (13 ft) tall and broad, it is a substantial deciduous shrub. With ovate leaves, it produces delicately fragrant, drooping racemes of pale yellow flowers with orange anthers in spring.

The Latin specific epithet sinensis means "Chinese" or "of China". The Latin meaning of Corylopsis refers to its resemblance of the genus Corylus (hazel).

There are four varieties and one form recorded:-

- Corylopsis sinensis var. calvescens
- Corylopsis sinensis var. glandulifera
- Corylopsis sinensis var. parvifolia
- Corylopsis sinensis var. sinensis
- Corylopsis sinensis f. veitchiana

This plant is cultivated as an ornamental. Though hardy down to −15 °C (5 °F), it prefers a sheltered spot in acidic soil. Both C. sinensis var. calvescens f. veitchiana and C. sinensis var. sinensis are recipients of the Royal Horticultural Society's Award of Garden Merit.
