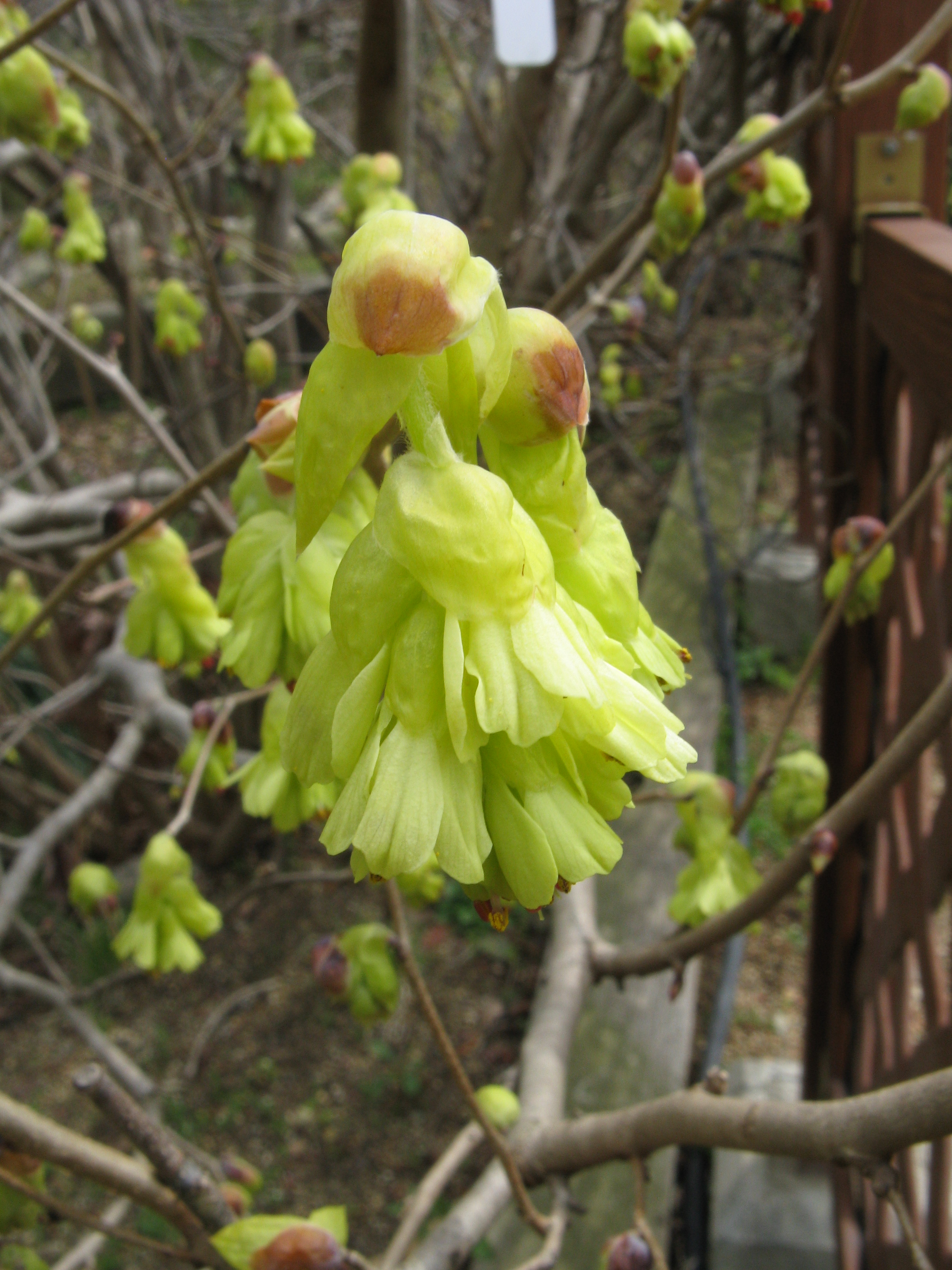
- Flowers on a branch

Scientific classification
- Kingdom: Plantae
- Clade: Tracheophytes
- Clade: Angiosperms
- Clade: Eudicots
- Order: Saxifragales
- Family: Hamamelidaceae
- Genus: Corylopsis
- Species: C. spicata

Binomial name
- Corylopsis spicata Siebold & Zucc.

Synonyms
- Corylopsis kesakii Siebold & Zucc.

= Corylopsis spicata =

Species of flowering plant

Corylopsis spicata (winter hazel) is a plant in the witch hazel family, Hamamelidaceae. It is a shrub with alternate, simple leaves, on thin, flexible, horizontal stems. The flowers are yellow, borne in late winter and early spring.
