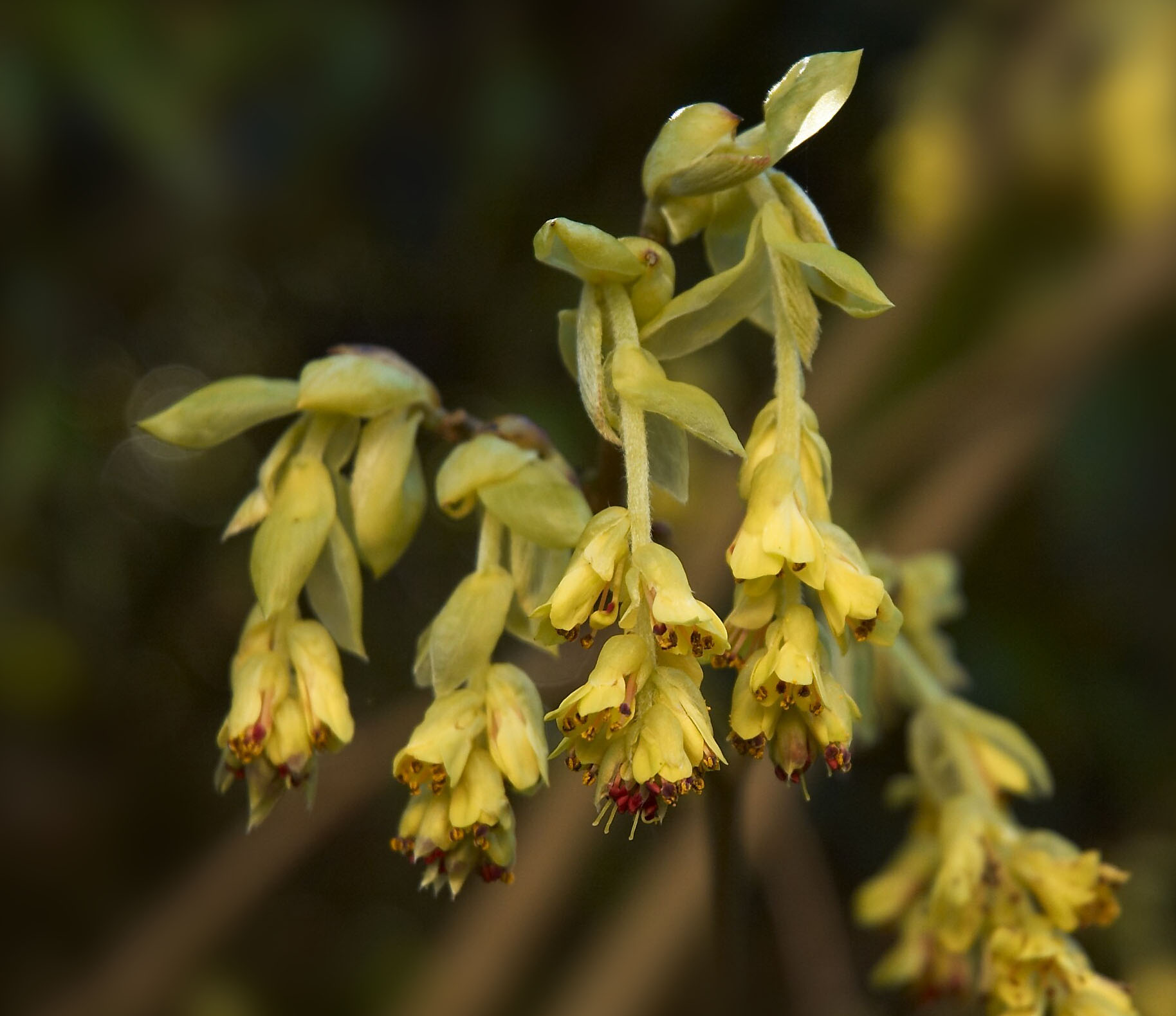
- Flowers of C. pauciflora

Conservation status
- Data Deficient (IUCN 3.1)

Scientific classification
- Kingdom: Plantae
- Clade: Tracheophytes
- Clade: Angiosperms
- Clade: Eudicots
- Order: Saxifragales
- Family: Hamamelidaceae
- Genus: Corylopsis
- Species: C. pauciflora

Binomial name
- Corylopsis pauciflora Siebold & Zucc.

= Corylopsis pauciflora =

Species of flowering plant

Corylopsis pauciflora, the buttercup witch hazel or winter hazel, is a species of flowering plant in the family Hamamelidaceae, native to Taiwan and Japan. It is a deciduous, spreading shrub growing to 1.5 m (4 ft 11 in) tall by 2.5 m (8 ft 2 in) wide. It produces masses of pale yellow flowers in pendent racemes in early spring, followed by leaves opening bronze and turning to rich green. It is cultivated in gardens and parks in temperate regions.

The Latin specific epithet pauciflora means "with few flowers". This refers to the low number of flowers per inflorescence compared to other Corylopsis, not to the total number of flowers per plant. This plant has gained the Royal Horticultural Society's Award of Garden Merit.
