= Crown snow-load =

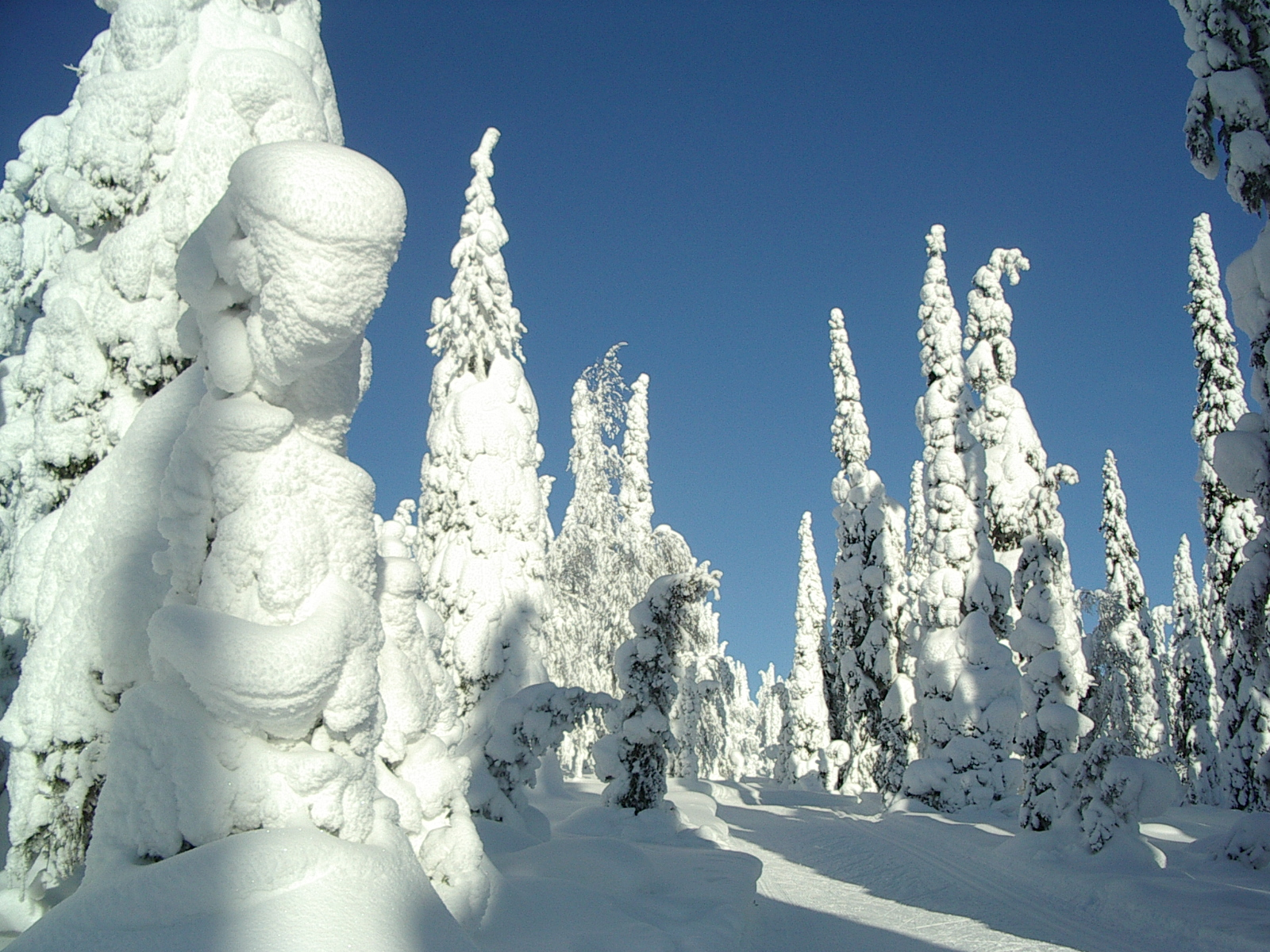
Crown snow-load on Picea abies in Kuusamo, Finland

Crown snow-load is snow and hard rime that accumulates on tree crowns in a cold climate. There are two main climatic conditions in which this phenomenon chiefly takes place. Hard rime is formed when subcooled droplets of fog or low-level stratus cloud freeze on the windward (wind-facing) side of tree branches, buildings, or any other solid objects. This takes place usually with moderate wind speeds from 3 to 6 m/s (9.8 to 19.7 ft/s) and air temperatures between −2 and −8 °C (28 and 18 °F). Snow may accumulate directly on the trees when a warm front brings wet snow, the air temperature is slightly above the freezing point and the surface of the tree is colder due to a preceding cold spell.

In Scandinavia and Finland, largest snow-loads accumulate to the trees on top of medium-sized fells. The larger fells and mountains have no trees, and the tops of lowest fells do not reach the cloud bases so often. Also the wind speeds are largest on fell tops. One spruce in Northern Finland can collect 3–4 t (3.0–3.9 long tons; 3.3–4.4 short tons) of snow. When the crown is loaded with snow, a storm can easily damage the trees. Snow-loaded trees also pose a risk to powerlines.
