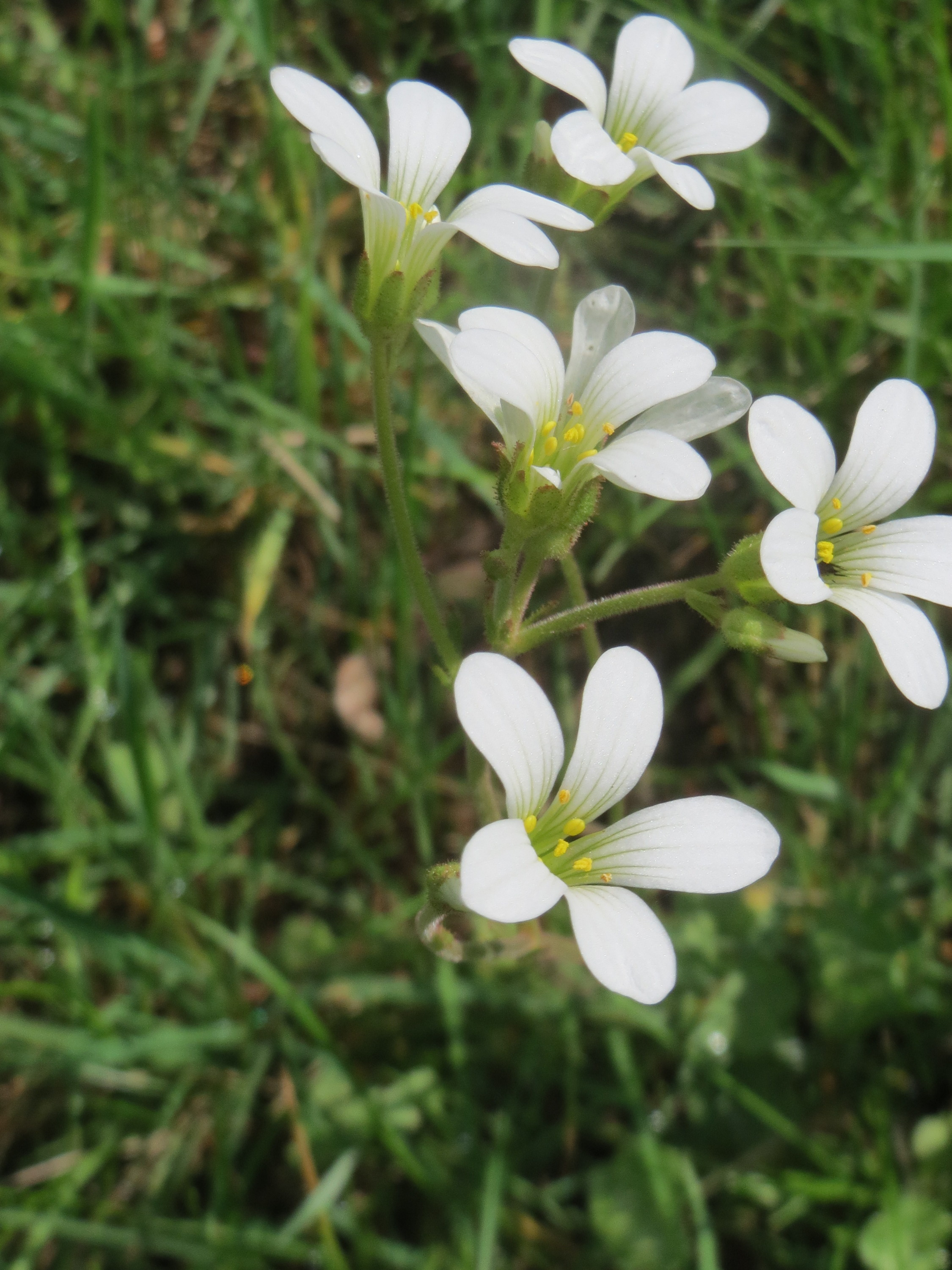
- Saxifraga granulata L. meadow saxifrage

Scientific classification
- Kingdom: Plantae
- Clade: Tracheophytes
- Clade: Angiosperms
- Clade: Eudicots
- Clade: Core eudicots
- Clade: Superrosids
- Order: Saxifragales; Bercht. & J.Presl

Type genus
- Saxifraga L.

Families
- Altingiaceae Lindl., nom. cons.; Aphanopetalaceae Doweld; Cercidiphyllaceae Engl., nom. cons.; Crassulaceae J.St.-Hil., nom. cons.; Cynomoriaceae Endl. ex Lindl., nom. cons.; Daphniphyllaceae Müll.Arg., nom. cons.; Grossulariaceae DC., nom. cons.; Haloragaceae R.Br., nom. cons.; Hamamelidaceae R.Br., nom. cons.; Iteaceae J.Agardh, nom. cons. (including Pterostemonaceae); Paeoniaceae Raf., nom. cons.; Penthoraceae Rydb. ex Britton, nom. cons.; Peridiscaceae Kuhlm., nom. cons. (including Medusandraceae); Saxifragaceae Juss., nom. cons.; Tetracarpaeaceae Nakai

Synonyms
- Cercidiphyllales; Crassulales; Daphniphyllales; Grossulariales; Haloragales; Hamamelidales; Iteales; Paeoniales; Sedales

= Saxifragales =

Saxifragales Temporal range: 89.5–0 Ma Turonian - Recent

Order of flowering plants

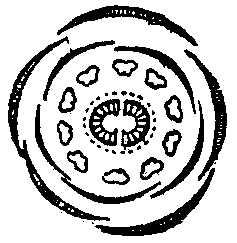
Floral diagram Saxifraga: Bicarpellate Gynoecium

Saxifragales is an order of flowering plants in the superrosid clade of the eudicots. It contains 15 families and around 100 genera, with nearly 2,500 species. Well-known and economically important members of this order include saxifrages (after which the order is named), blackcurrants, redcurrants, gooseberries, peonies, liquidambars, witch-hazel, Persian ironwood, katsura, jade plant, houseleeks, and water milfoil.

Of the 15 families, many are small, with eight of them being monotypic (having only a single genus). The largest family is the Crassulaceae (stonecrops), a diverse group of mostly succulent plants, with about 35 genera. Saxifragales are found worldwide, primarily in temperate to subtropical zones, rarely being encountered growing wild in the tropics; however, many species are now cultivated throughout the world as knowledge of plant husbandry has improved. They can be found in a wide variety of environments, from deserts to fully aquatic habitats, with species adapted to alpine, forested or fully-aquatic habitats. Many are epiphytic or lithophytic, growing on exposed cliff faces, on trees or on rocks, and not requiring a highly organic or nutrient-dense substrate to thrive.

Globally, the saxifrages have a wide variety of uses by humans, ranging from textiles and timber to foodstuffs. Several families—such as the aforementioned Crassulaceae—and genera are of significant commercial importance in some countries and economies, being cultivated on a large scale for sale as ornamental plants. Apart from ornamentals, another highly prized group are the Grossulariaceae (currants and gooseberries), particularly blackcurrants, redcurrants and white currants.

Overall, the order is extremely diverse, encompassing numerous trees, shrubs, perennial herbs and succulent plants, as well as aquatic and semi-aquatic species. The order's high degree of diversity, in terms of vegetative and reproductive traits (and sheer amount of species), can make it challenging to find any common or unifying features amongst the respective genera.

In the Angiosperm Phylogeny Group classification system, the Saxifragales are placed within the major division of flowering plants referred to as eudicots, specifically the core eudicots. This subgroup consists of the Dilleniaceae, superasterids and superrosids. The superrosids, in turn, have two components, rosids and Saxifragales. The Saxifragales order has undergone considerable revision since its original classification, which had been based purely on plant characteristics. The modern classification is based on genetic studies, using molecular phylogenetics. There is an extensive fossil record from the Turonian-Campanian phase of the late Cretaceous, dating to about 90 million years ago (Myr). However, molecular studies may suggest an older origin, from the early Cretaceous (102–108 Myr), with rapid and early diversification to more modern forms.

== Description ==
The order Saxifragales is extremely morphologically diverse (hyper-diverse). It includes trees (e.g. witch hazel, witch alder in Hamamelidaceae), fruit bearing shrubs (e.g. currants, gooseberries in Grossulariaceae), lianas, annual and perennial herbs, rock garden plants (e.g. saxifrage in Saxifragaceae), ornamental garden plants (e.g. peonies in Paeoniaceae), succulents (e.g. stonecrop in Crassulaceae) and aquatics (e.g. watermilfoil in Haloragaceae). The flowers demonstrate major variations in sepal, petal, stamen, and carpel number, as well as ovary position (see Biogeography and evolution).

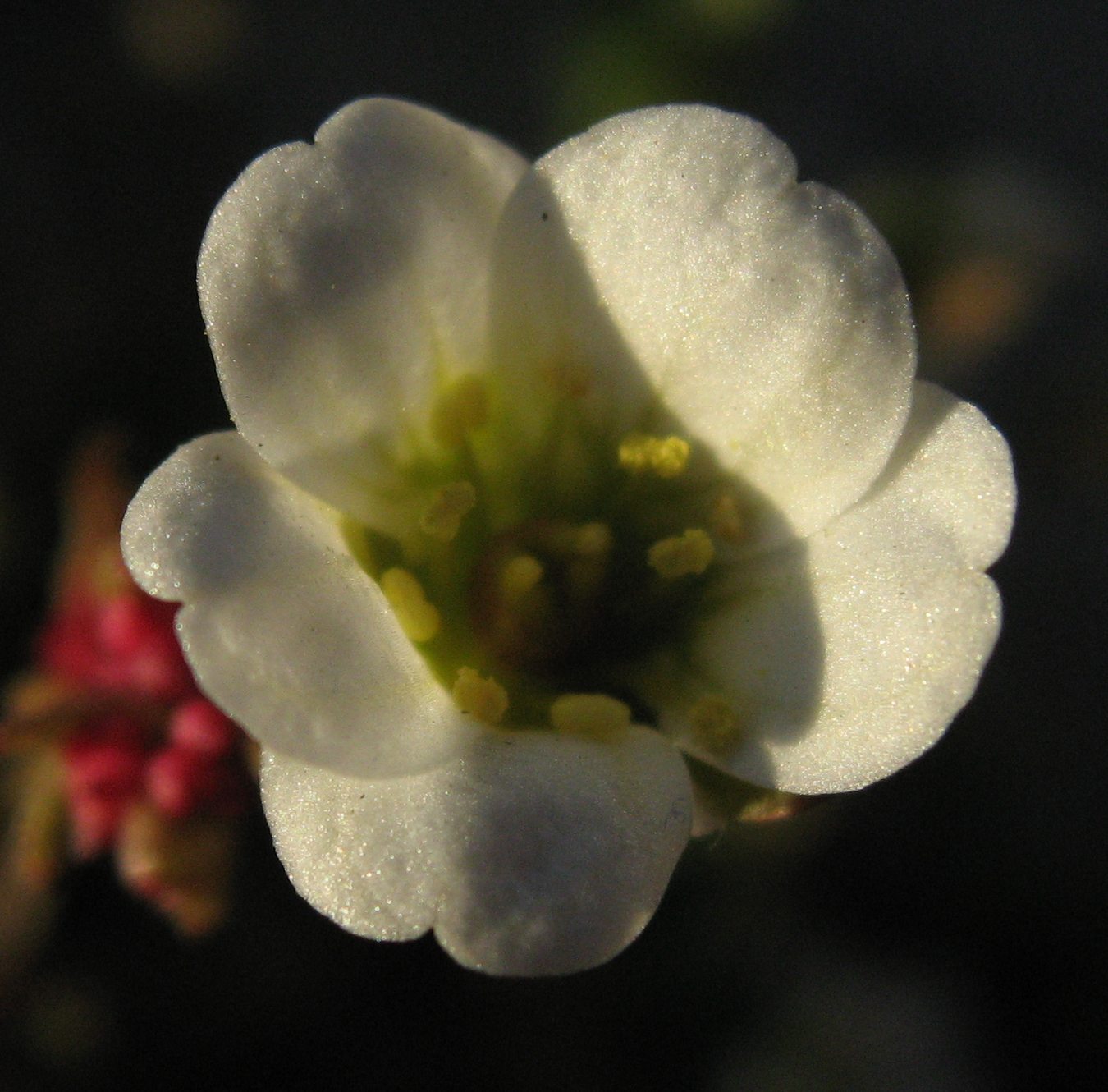
Saxifraga cernua:
Radial symmetry
5 free petals

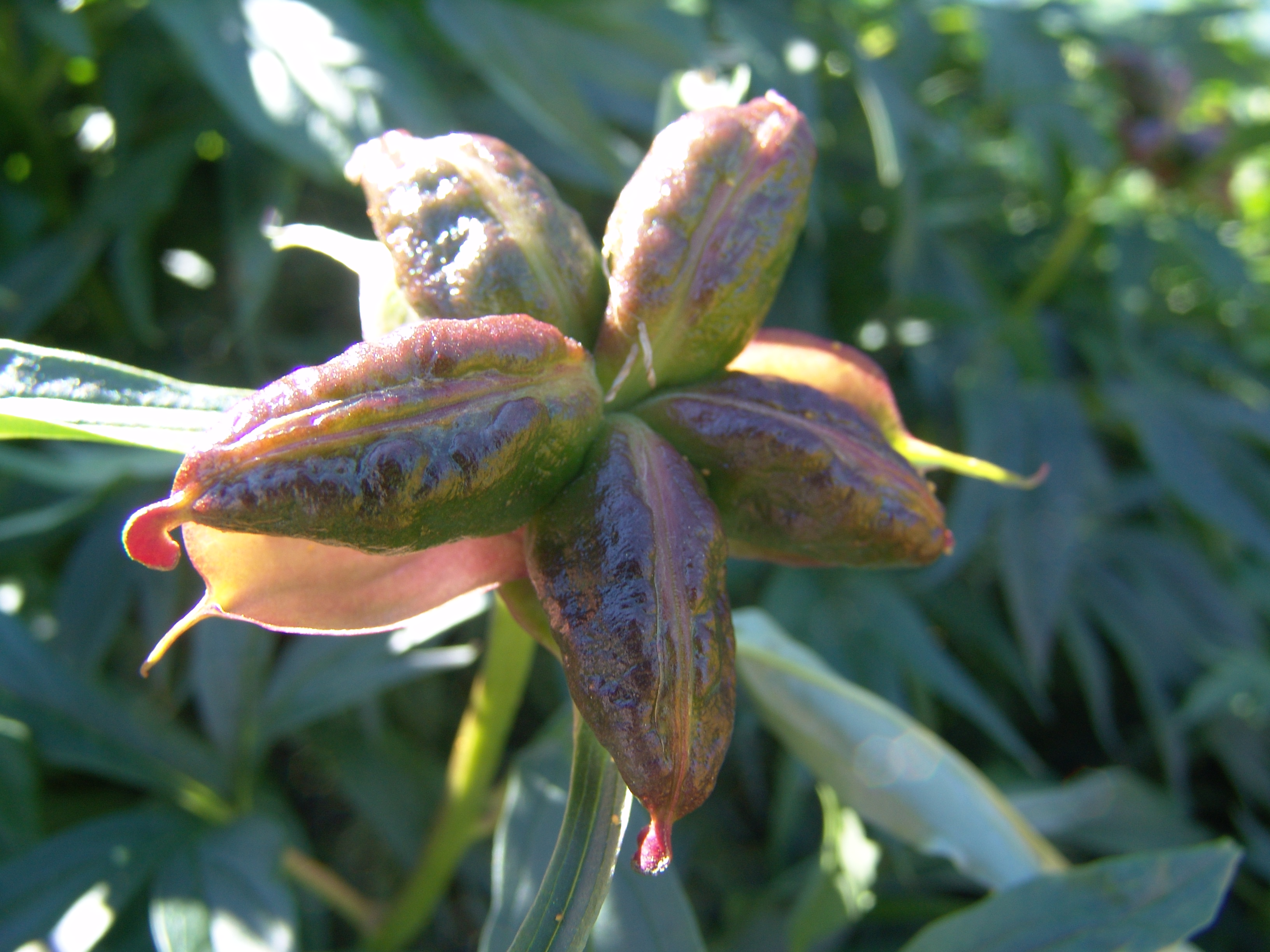
Paeonia lactiflora:
Follicular fruit

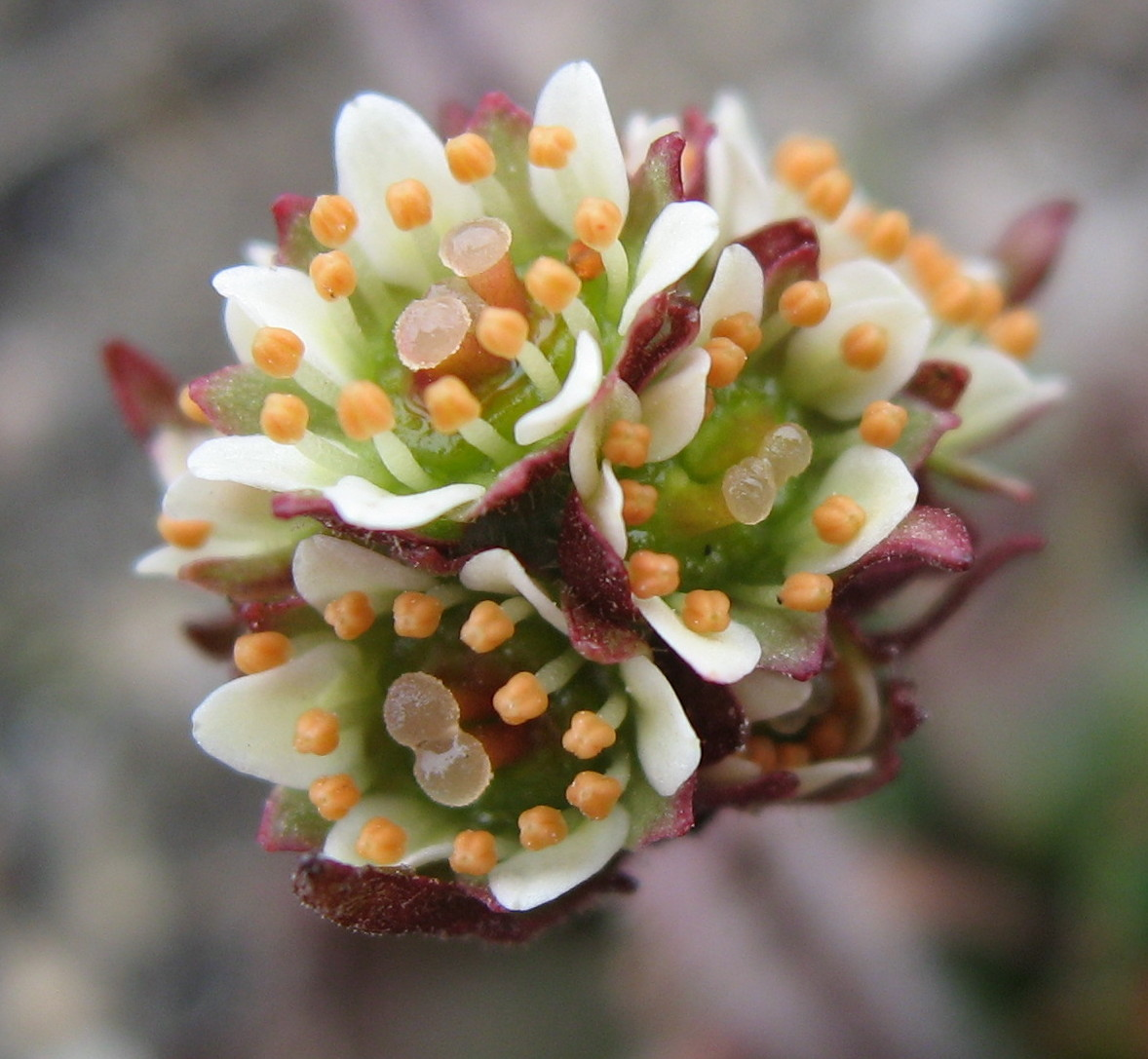
Saxifraga nivalis:
Basifixed anthers

This degree of diversity makes defining synapomorphy (derived common characteristics) for the group extremely difficult, the order being defined on the basis of molecular affinity rather than morphology. However, some characteristics that are prevalent (common traits) represent potential or putative synapomorphies based on ancestral states. These include flowers that are usually radially symmetric and petals that are free. The gynoecium (female reproductive part) generally consists of two carpels (ovary, style and stigma) that are free, at least toward the apex (partially fused bicarpellate gynoecium) and possess a hypanthium (cup shaped basal floral tube). In the androecium (male reproductive part), the stamen anthers are generally basifixed (attached at its base to the filament), sometimes dorsifixed (attached at centre) (see Carlsward et al (2011) Figure 2). Other commonly occurring features are fruit that is generally follicular (formed from a single carpel), seeds with abundant endosperm surrounding the embryo and leaves with glandular teeth at their margins (glandular dentate, see image). Within the Saxifragales, while the families of the woody clade are primarily woody, the primarily herbaceous families of Crassulaceae and Saxifragaceae exhibit woody features as a secondary transition.

== Taxonomy ==
Saxifragales is a relatively small angiosperm order, having only 15 families, about 100 genera and about 2,470 species.

=== History ===
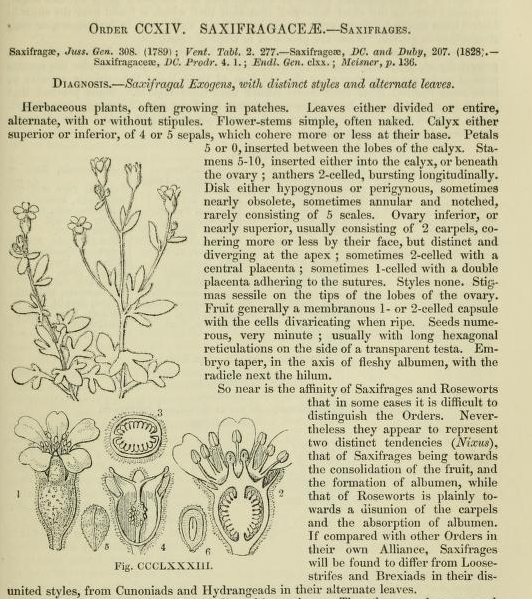
John Lindley's description of Saxifragales 1853

Saxifragales was first described in 1820 by Berchtold and Presl as a group of plants, Saxifrageae, with five genera, including Saxifraga, lending their names as the botanical authority (Bercht. & J.Presl). At times, that authority has also been given to Dumortier, due to a later publication (1829). Dumortier first used the word Saxifragaceae. By the time of John Lindley's The Vegetable Kingdom (1853), the term Saxifragales was in use, which Lindley called an Alliance, containing five families. Later, the Saxifragales were placed in the angiosperm class Dicotyledons, also called Magnoliopsida.

=== Phylogeny ===
The order Saxifragales has undergone considerable revision in both placement and composition, since the use of molecular phylogenetics, and the use of the modern Angiosperm Phylogeny Group (APG) classification. They are identified as a strongly monophyletic group.

In the initial APG publication (1998), the Saxifragales were identified within the core eudicots clade but its relationship to other clades was uncertain. The core eudicots consist of the order Gunnerales and a large clade of Pentapetalae (so named for having a synapomorphy of pentamerous (5 part) perianths), the latter representing about 70% of all angiosperms, with eight major lineages. Later (2003), the order was described as "one of the major surprises of molecular phylogenetic analyses of the angiosperms", having elements previously placed in three or four separate subclasses based on morphology. This was eventually resolved in the third APG system (2009), placing Saxifragales as a sister group to the rosids (Rosidae), within the Pentapetalae clade. This large combination has subsequently been given the name superrosids (Superrosidae), representing part of an early diversification of the angiosperms. Among the rosids, they share a number of similarities with the Rosales, particularly Rosaceae, including a hypanthium, five part flowers and free floral parts. As circumscribed, Saxifragales account for 1.3% of eudicot diversity.

Cladogram of Saxifragales relationships among core eudicots

- Core eudicots 130
  - 126
    Gunnerales
  - Pentapetalae 128
    - superasterids
    - - 125
        Dilleniales
      - superrosids 124
        - 116
          rosids
        - 108
          Saxifragales

Numbers indicate divergence times in Myr

=== Biogeography and evolution ===
Diversification among Saxifragales was rapid, with the extensive fossil record indicating that the order was more diverse and more widespread than an examination of the extant members suggests, with considerable phenotypic diversity occurring early. The earliest fossil evidence is found in the Turonian-Campanian (late Cretaceous), suggesting a minimum age of 89.5 Myr. However, molecular divergence time estimation suggest an earlier time of 102–108 Myr, into the early Cretaceous, for the crown and stem groups respectively. Within the order Saxifragales, the molecular data imply a very rapid initial diversification time of about 6–8 Myr, between 112 and 120 Myr, with major lineages appearing within 3–6 Myr.

The ancestral state appears to be woody, as in Peridiscaceae and the woody clade, but is also ancestral to Grossulariaceae. A number of independent transitions to a herbaceous habit occurred in the ancestors of Crassulaceae, Saxifragaceae and the base of the Haloragaceae-Penthoraceae clade (the other two families in Haloragaceae s.l. remaining woody), while other taxa reverted to a woody habit, especially Crassulaceae. Most of Saxifragales have a superior ovary, but some families show frequent transition with inferior or subinferior position, particularly Saxifragaceae and to a lesser extent Hamamelidaceae. Almost all Grossulariaceae have an inferior ovary. The ancestral carpel number is two, with transition to higher numbers, such as four in Haloragaceae s.l. and Peridiscaceae with five in Penthoraceae. The ancestral carpel number for Crassulaceae is five, decreasing to four in Kalanchoe, where it is synapomorphic for the genus, though the most frequent transition in this family is 6–10, but only where stamen number is increased above five. Some Macaronesian taxa (Aeonieae) have 8–12, with up to 32 carpels for Aeonium.

The ancestral petal number is five, with three major transitions; 5 to 0, 5 to 4, 5 to 6–10. Increased petal number is seen in Paeoniaceae and Crassulaceae, particularly where stamen number is also increased. Cercidiphyllum + Daphniphyllum, Chrysosplenium and Altingia are examples of the complete loss of petals. The ancestral stamen:petal ratio is 1, with transitions characterising several clades, e.g. Paeonicaceae+woody clade >2, Crassulaceae 2 (but Crassula 1). Overall there has been a decrease over evolution, but independent of a decrease in petal number, so that it is the stamen number that has decreased. The ancestral habitat appears to be forests, followed by early diversification into desert and aquatic habitats, with shrubland the most recent colonization.

Species diversification was rapid following a transition from a warmer, wetter Earth in the Eocene (56–40 Myr) to early Miocene (23–16 Myr), to the cooler drier conditions of the mid-Miocene (16–12 Myr). However, this appears to not have coincided with ecological and phenotypic evolution, which are themselves correlated. There is a clear lag, whereby increase in species diversification was followed later by increases in niche and phenotypic lability.

=== Subdivision ===
The first APG classification (1998) placed 13 families within the order Saxifragales:

- Altingiaceae
- Cercidiphyllaceae
- Crassulaceae
- Daphniphyllaceae
- Grossulariaceae
- Haloragaceae
- Hamamelidaceae
- Iteaceae
- Paeoniaceae
- Penthoraceae
- Pterostemonaceae
- Saxifragaceae
- Tetracarpaeaceae

This was subsequently revised to 15, in the fourth version (2016). The Saxifragales families have been grouped into a number of informally named suprafamilial subclades, with the exception of the basal split of Peridiscaceae, which thus forms a sister group with the rest of Saxifragales. The two major ones are (Paeoniaceae + the woody clade of primarily woody families) and the "core" Saxifragales (i.e. the primarily herbaceous families), with the latter subdivided into two further subclades, (Haloragaceae sensu lato + Crassulaceae) and the Saxifragaceae alliance.

In the clade Haloragaceae sensu lato (s.l.) + Crassulaceae the genera constituting Haloragaceae s.l. are all small, and APG II (2003) proposed merging them into a single larger Haloragaceae s.l., but transferred Aphanopetalum from Cunoniaceae to this group. The Saxifragaceae alliance represents Saxifragaceae together with a number of woody members of the traditional Saxifragaceae sensu Engler (1930). Within this, APG II (2003) proposed placing the two species of Pterostemon that constitute Pterostemonaceae within Iteaceae, and all subsequent versions have maintained this practice. Thus Saxifragales sensu APG II consisted of only 10 families. The third version (2009) added Peridiscaceae (from Malpighiales), as sister to all other families, but re-expanded Haloragaceae to provide for a narrower circumscription, Haloragaceae sensu stricto (s.s.), to give a total of 14 families. APG IV (2016) added the parasitic family Cynomoriaceae to provide a total of 15 families, although its placement within the order remained unclear.

Of the 15 families included in APG IV, the basal divergence Peridiscaceae underwent radical shifting and recircumscription from 2003 to 2009. Originally, it consisted of two closely related genera, Peridiscus and Whittonia. The APG II system placed the family in Malpighiales, based on a DNA sequence for the rbcL gene from Whittonia. This sequence turned out to be not from Whittonia, but from other plants whose DNA had contaminated the sample. After placement in Saxifragales, it was expanded to include Soyauxia in 2007, and Medusandra in 2009.

In the first of the subclades of the remaining Saxifragales, Paeoniaceae possesses many unique features and its taxonomic position was controversial for a long time, and Paeonia was placed in Ranunculales, close to Glaucidium, prior to transfer to Saxifragales as sister to the woody clade.

In the woody clade, the genus Liquidambar was included in Hamamelidaceae until molecular phylogenetic studies showed that its inclusion might make Hamamelidaceae paraphyletic, and was segregated as a separate monotypic family, Altingiaceae in 2008. Cercidiphyllaceae was for a long time associated with Hamamelidaceae and Trochodendraceae and was often thought to be closer to the latter, which is now in the basal eudicot order Trochodendrales. Daphniphyllum was always thought to have an anomalous combination of characters and was placed in several different orders before molecular phylogenetic analysis showed it to belong to Saxifragales.

In the core Saxifragales, Crassulaceae and Tetracarpaeaceae have been associated with Saxifragaceae, while Penthorum has been associated both with Crassulaceae and Saxifragaceae, before being placed here. Aphanopetalum was often placed in Cunoniaceae, a family in Oxalidales, even though there were good reasons to put it in Saxifragales, and it was subsequently transferred. Haloragaceae was included in Myrtales, before being placed in Saxifragales.

The other "core" group, the Saxifragaceae alliance comprises four families: Pterostemonaceae, Iteaceae, Grossulariaceae, and Saxifragaceae, which have long been known to be related to each other, but the circumscription of Saxifragaceae has been much reduced and Pterostemonaceae submerged as Pterostemon in Iteaceae.

Most of the families are monogeneric. Choristylis is now considered a synonym of Itea, but the addition of Pterostemon, gives Iteaceae two genera. Liquidambar and Semiliquidambar are also submerged into Altingia, making Altingiaceae monogeneric. About 95% of the species are in five families: Crassulaceae (1400), Saxifragaceae (500), Grossulariaceae (150–200), Haloragaceae (150), and Hamamelidaceae (100).

The relationships of the Saxifragales families to each other is shown in the following cladogram. The phylogeny in this cladogram still has some uncertainty as to the exact relationships, and the phylogenetic tree is subject to further revision. Cynomoriaceae, previously placed in Santales or Rosales is included in Saxifragales, but unplaced within it. Li et al. (2019) have slightly different relationships, and also place Cynomoriaceae as the first branch in the Crassulaceae+Haloragaceae s.l. tree, i.e. as sister to those two families. The number of genera in each family is shown in parentheses:

Cladogram of Saxifragales families

- Saxifragales
  - Peridiscaceae (4)
  - 97
    - - Paeonia (Paeoniaceae)
      - woody clade
        - Liquidambar (Altingiaceae)
        - 69
          - 98
            Hamamelidaceae (27)
          - 95
            - Cercidiphyllum (Cercidiphyllaceae)
            - Daphniphyllum (Daphniphyllaceae)
    - core Saxifragales
      - - Crassulaceae (34)
        - Haloragaceae s.l.
          - Aphanopetalum (Aphanopetalaceae)
          - - Tetracarpaea (Tetracarpaeaceae)
            - - Penthorum (Penthoraceae)
              - Haloragaceae s.s. (8)
      - Saxifragaceae alliance
        - - Iteaceae (including Pterostemonaceae) (2)
        - - Ribes (Grossulariaceae)
          - Saxifragaceae (33)

100% maximum likelihood bootstrap support except where labeled with bootstrap percentage
Monogeneric families are represented by genus names, otherwise the number of genera is in (parentheses)
Cynomorium (Cynomoriaceae) remains unplaced within this tree

=== Families ===
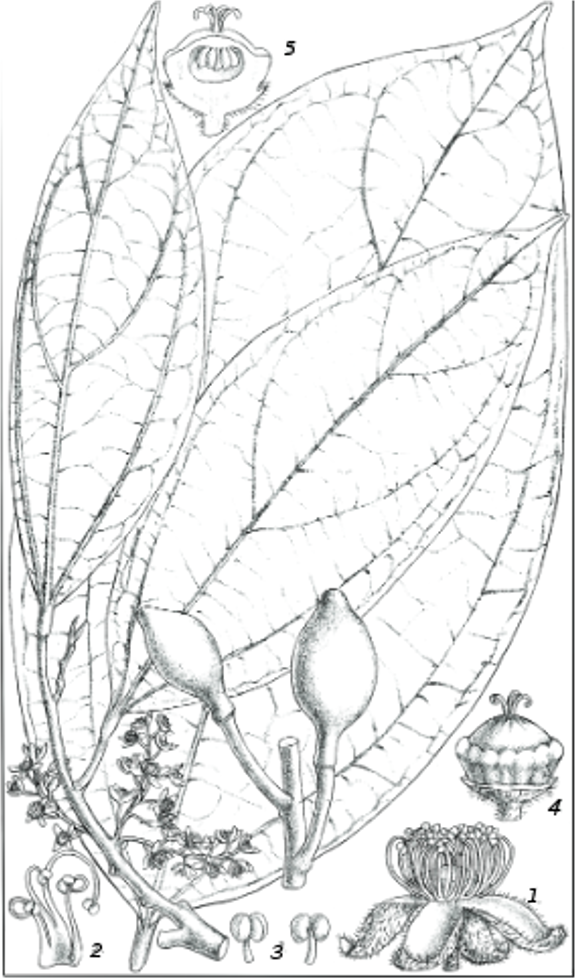
Peridiscus lucidus

==== Peridiscaceae ====
The Peridiscaceae (Ringflower family) are a small tropical family of 4 genera and 11–12 species of small trees and shrubs found in the Guiana Shield of S America (2 genera, one of which, Whittonia, is thought to be extinct) and West and Central Africa (2 genera). The majority of species occur in the African genus Soyauxia. The name comes from the Greek, peri (around) discos (ring).

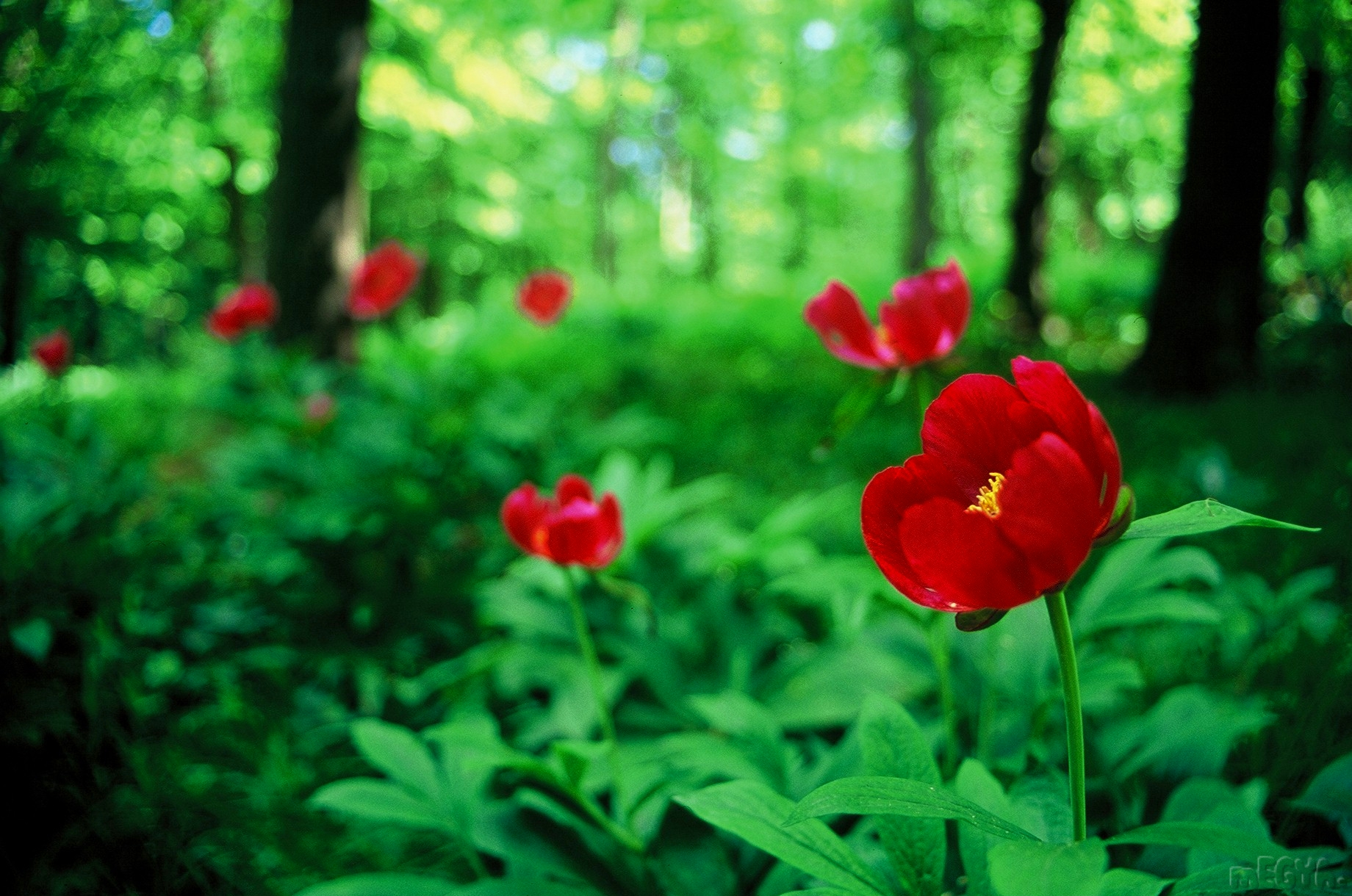
Paeonia officinalis

==== Paeoniaceae ====
The Paeoniaceae (Peony family) consist of a single genus (Paeonia) with about 33 species of perennial herbs and small shrubs with showy flowers, found from the Mediterranean to Japan, but two species occur in western N America. They are commercially important as popular garden ornamentals, cultivated since antiquity, and have been used medicinally. The herbaceous varieties are derived from P. lactiflora, while the shrubs are derived from P. suffruticosa (tree peony), both Asian species. The botanical name comes from its Greek name, paionia, named in turn for the God Pan.

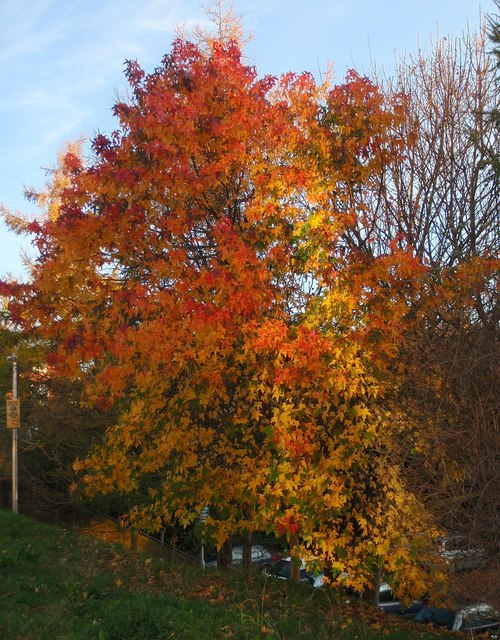
Liquidambar styraciflua

==== Altingiaceae ====
The Altingiaceae (sweetgum family) consist of a single genus (Liquidambar) with 15 species of trees with unisexual flowers found in Eurasia, but with one species in North and Central America, Liquidambar styraciflua (American sweetgum). Liquidambar is used for its resin and timber, as well being ornamental trees. The nominative genus and family are named after Willem Alting, and Liquidambar for liquid ambar, Arabic for the resin.

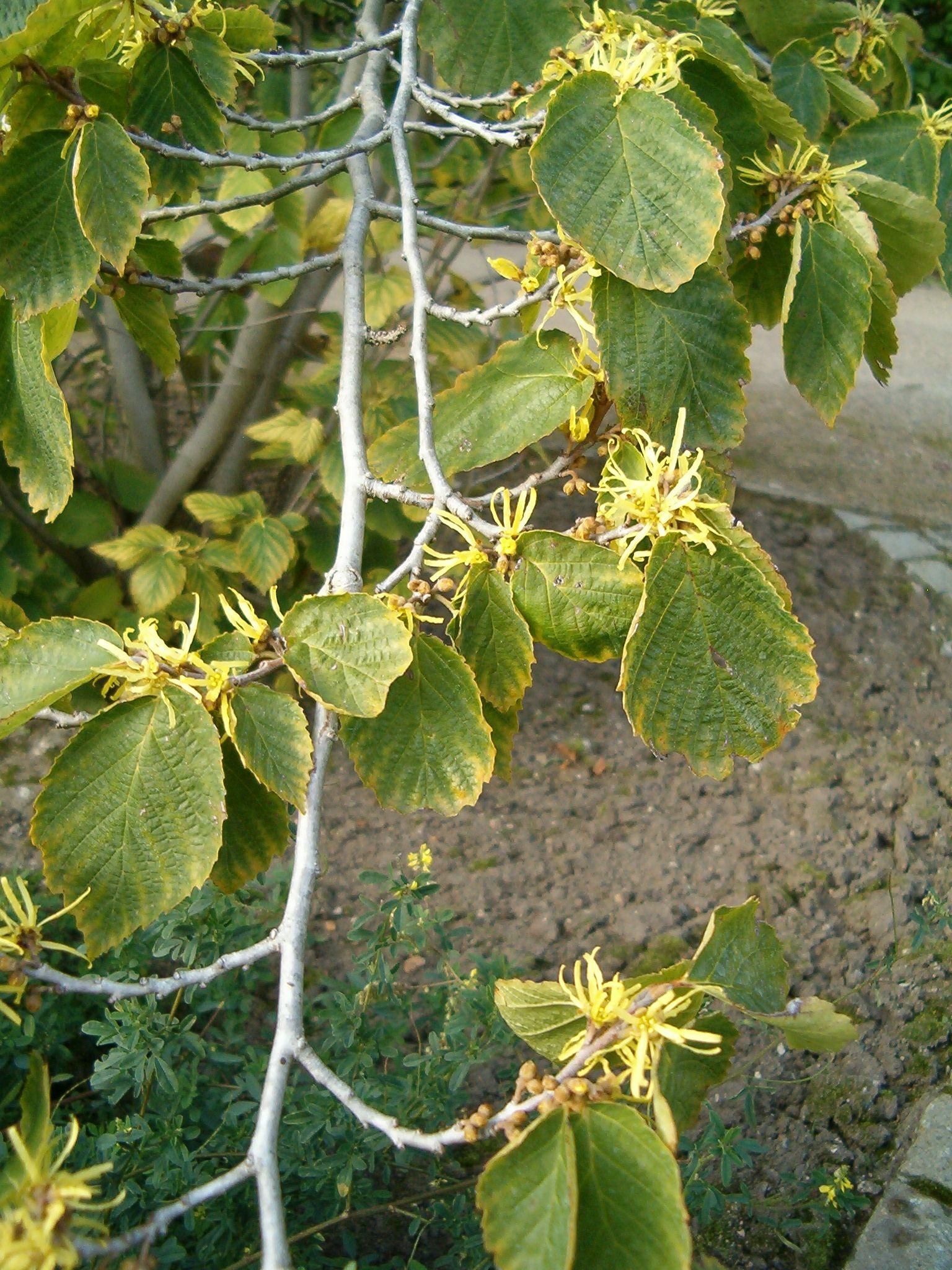
Hamamelis virginiana

==== Hamamelidaceae ====
The Hamamelidaceae (Witch-hazel family) consists of trees and shrubs with a widespread distribution, but main centres in East Asia and Malaysia. They are found in wet woodlands and forested slopes. The family has 26 genera and about 80–100 species, in five subfamilies, of which the nominative, Hamamelidoideae, contains over 75% of the genera. The species have uses as medicaments, timber and ornamental plants for their flowers, such as Hamamelis (witch hazel) or leaves, such as Parrotia persica (Persian ironwood). The family and nominative genus is named for the Greek hamamelis, the wych elm.

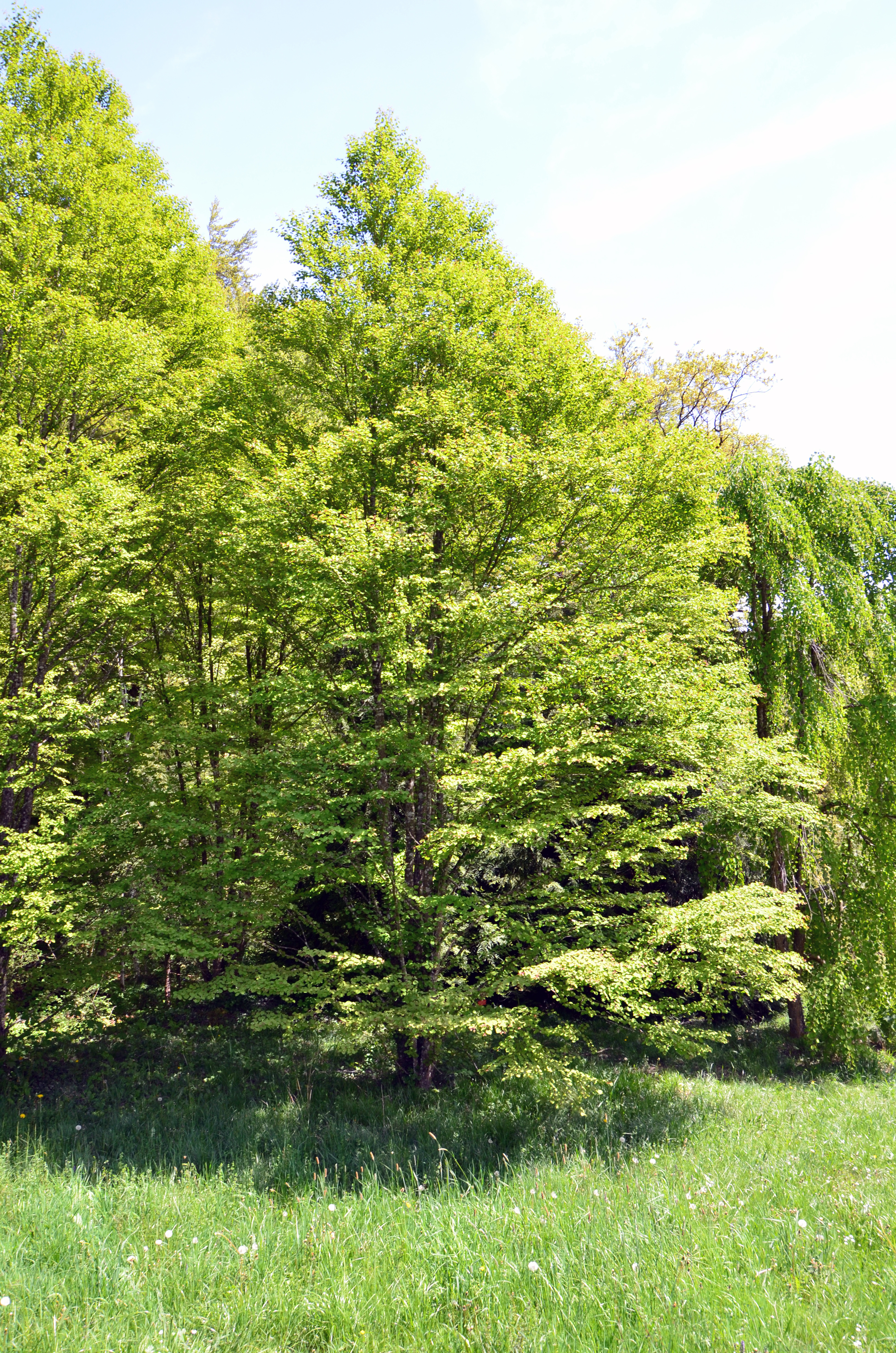
Cercidiphyllum japonicum

==== Cercidiphyllaceae ====
The Cercidiphyllaceae (Caramel-tree family) are a small family of deciduous trees found in China and Japan, with a single genus, Cercidiphyllum and two species, C. japonicum and C. magnificum. The trees are valued for their wood (katsura) and as ornamentals. C. japonicum is the largest deciduous tree in Japan. The name is derived from the Greek words kerkis (poplar) and fyllon (leaf), from a supposed similarity in leaves.

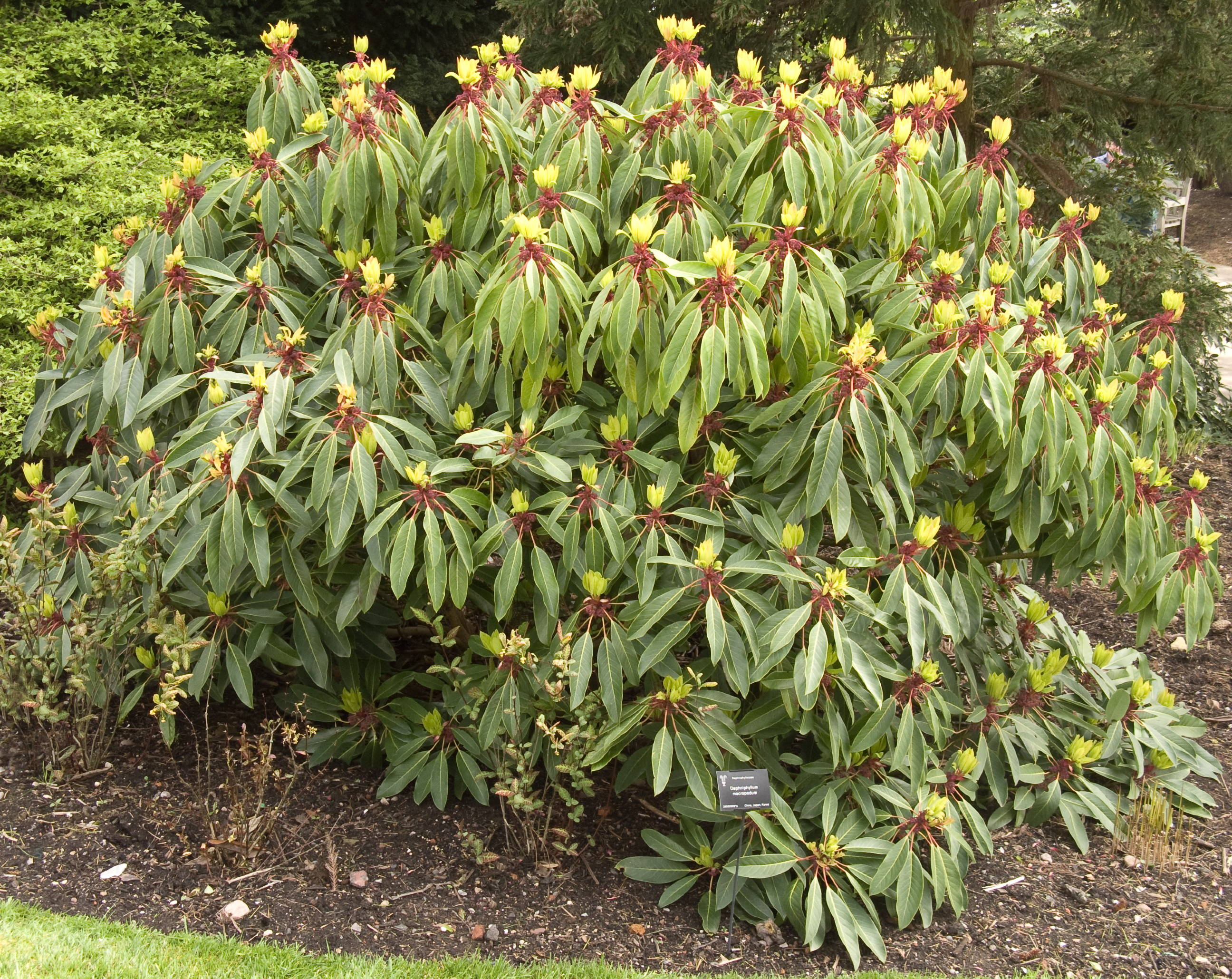
Daphniphyllum macropodum

==== Daphniphyllaceae ====
The Daphniphyllaceae (Laurel-leaf family) consist of a single genus, Daphniphyllum, with about 30 species. They are evergreen unisexual trees and shrubs distributed in SE Asia and the Solomon Islands. The dried leaves of Daphniphyllum macropodum (Note: D. humile is a synonym of the accepted D. macropodum) have been used for smoking in Japan and Siberia. The name is derived from the Greek words dafne (laurel) and fyllon (leaf), from a supposed resemblance to the leaves of the former (Laurus nobilis).

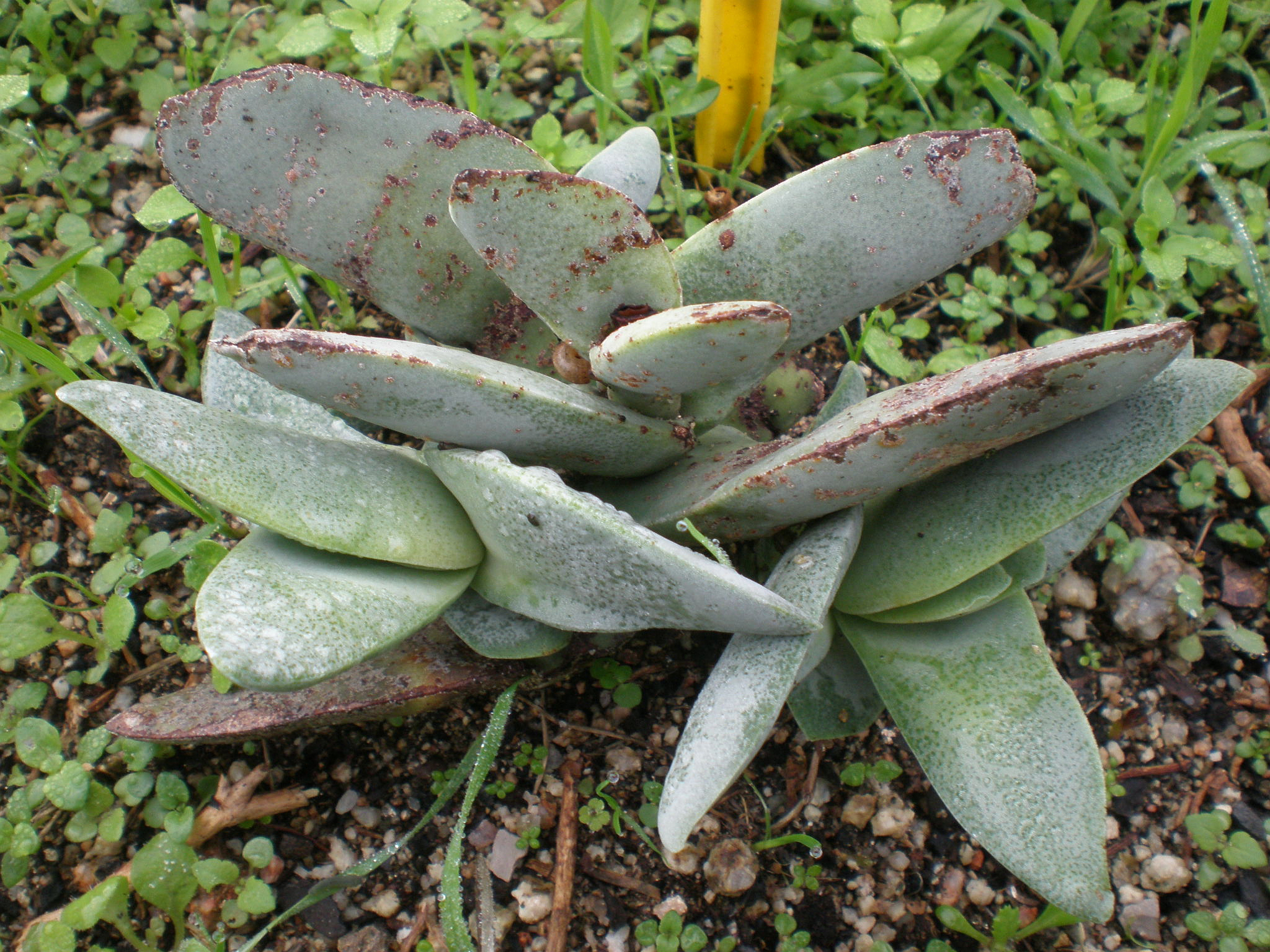
Crassula perfoliata

==== Crassulaceae ====
The Crassulaceae (Orpine and Stonecrop family) are a medium size diverse and cosmopolitan family, that form the largest family within Saxifragales. They are mainly succulent, rarely aquatic, with a specialised form of photosynthesis (Crassulacean Acid Metabolism). Genera vary from 7 to 35, depending on the circumscription of the large genus Sedum, and there are about 1,400 species. Uses are diverse, including spices, medicaments and roof coverings as well as ornamental rock garden and household plants such as the S African Crassula ovata, the jade or money plant. The name is derived from the Latin, crassus (thick), referring to the fleshy leaves.

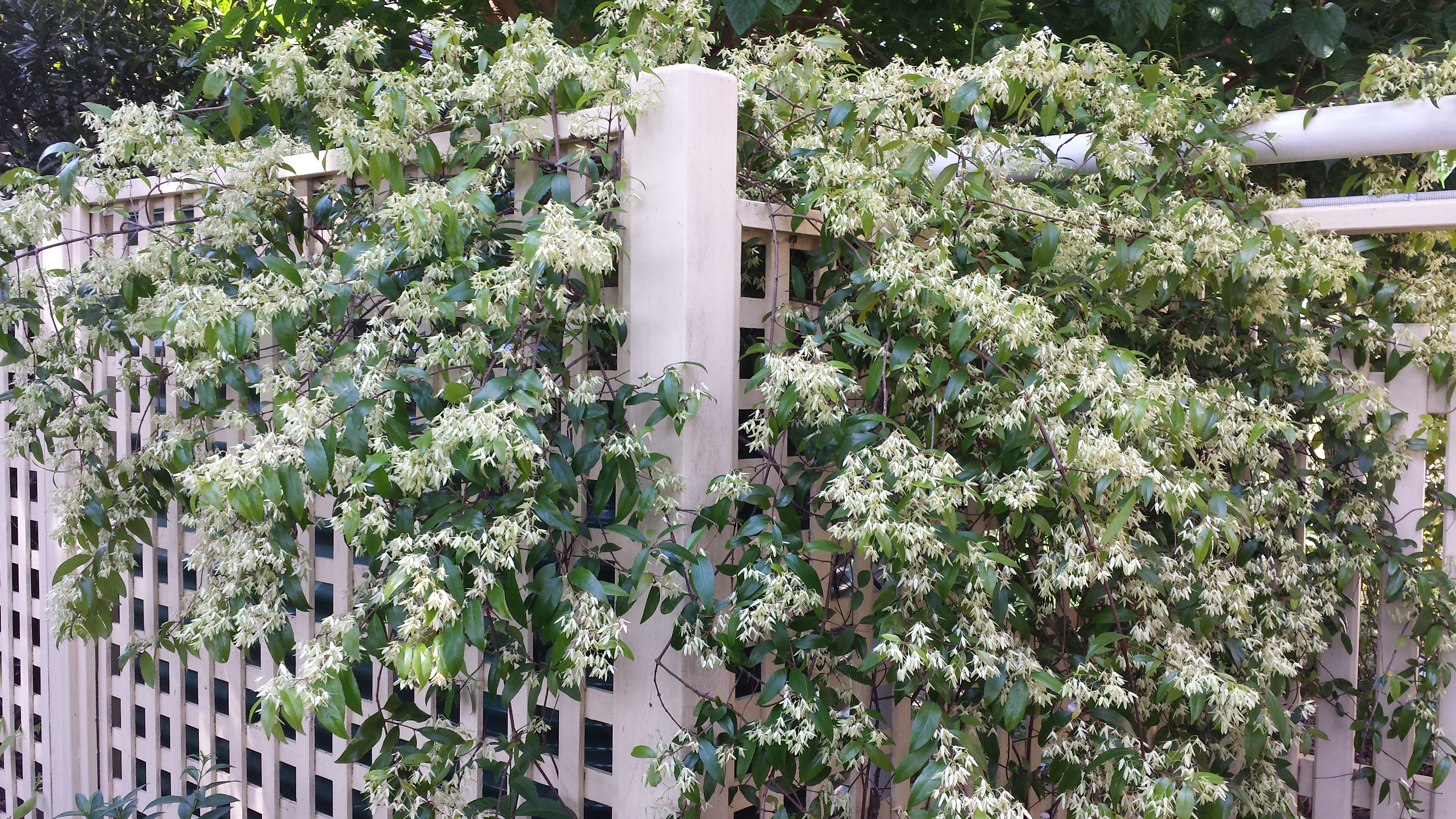
Aphanopetalum resinosum

==== Aphanopetalaceae ====
The Aphanopetalaceae (Gum-vine family) consists of a single genus of Australian climbing shrubs, Aphanopetalum, which has two species, A. clematidium (SW Australia) and A. resinosum (Queensland, NSW). The name is derived from the Greek words afanos (inconspicuous) and petalon (petal).

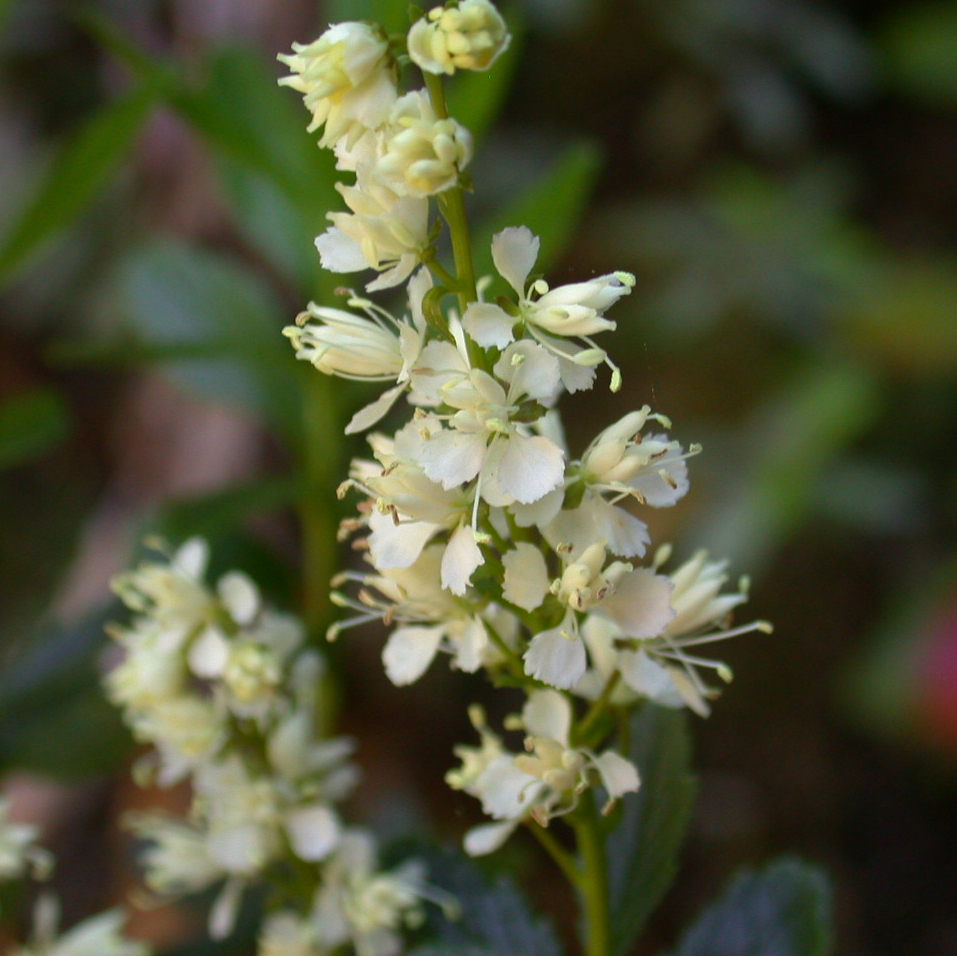
Tetracarpaea tasmannica

==== Tetracarpaeaceae ====
The Tetracarpaeaceae (Delicate-laurel family) is a very small evergreen Australian shrub family with a single genus, Tetracarpaea and a single species, T. tasmannica, confined to subalpine Tasmania. The name is derived from the Greek words tetra (four) and carpos (fruit), referring to the ovaries which have four carpels.

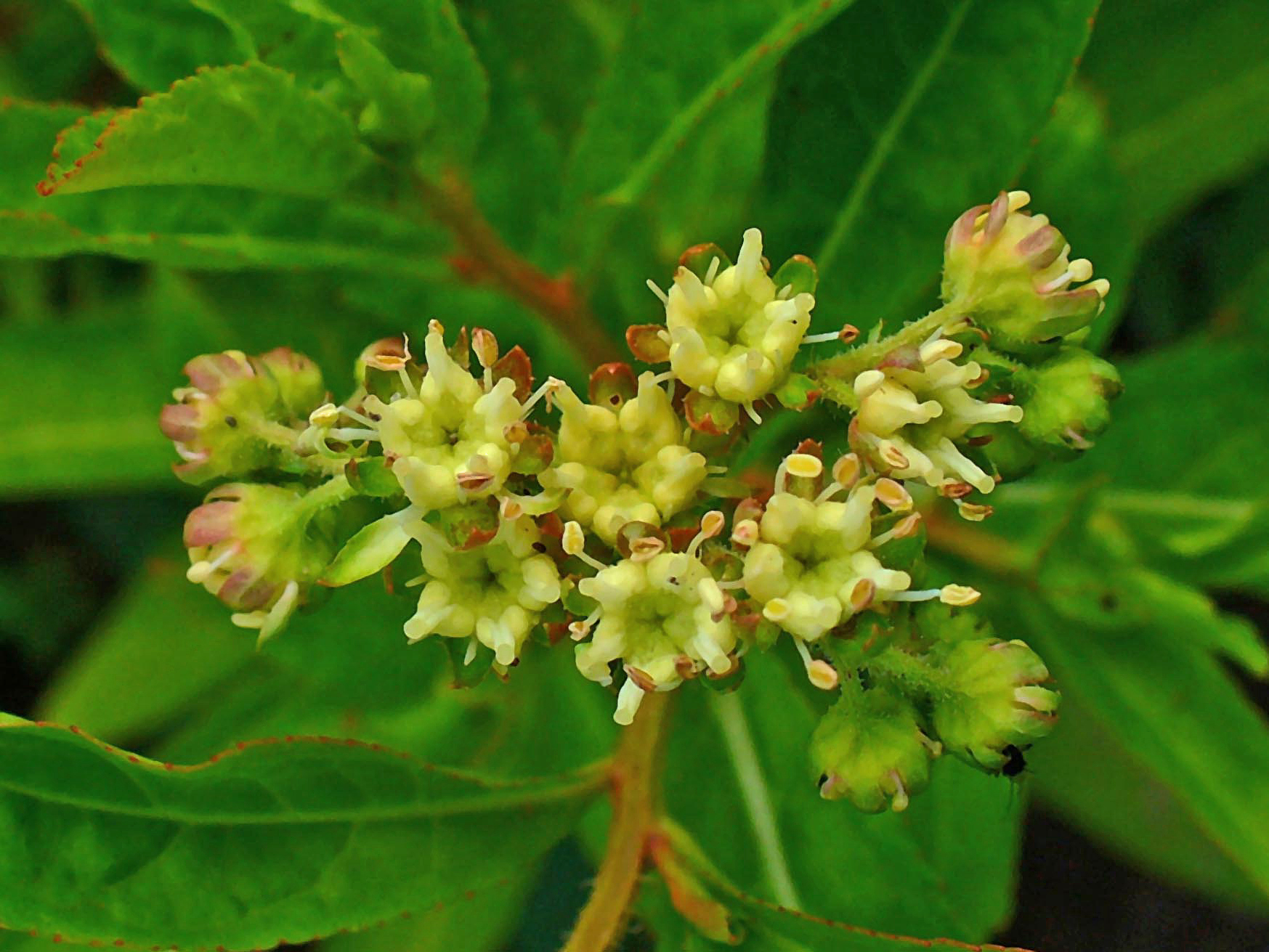
Penthorum sedoides

==== Penthoraceae ====
The Penthoraceae (Ditch-stonecrop family) is a very small family of rhizomatous perennial herbs found in eastern N America and E Asia, in mainly wet environments. It consists of a single genus, Penthorum with two species, P. sedoides in N America and P. chinense from Siberia to Thailand. P. sedoides is used in aquaria and water gardens. The name is derived from the Greek word pente (five) referring to the five-part fruit.

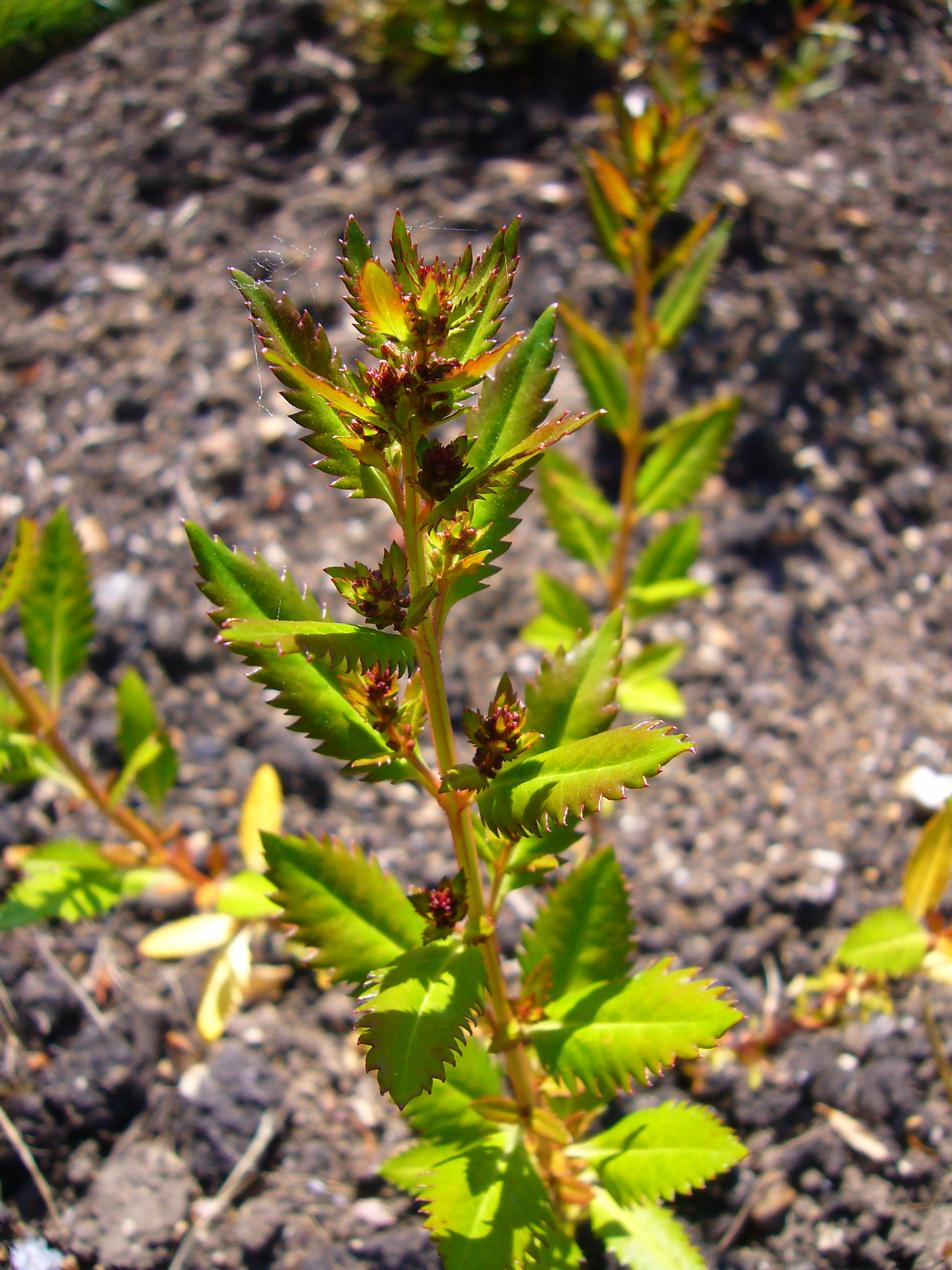
Haloragis erecta

==== Haloragaceae ====
The Haloragaceae (Water-milfoil family) is a small family of trees, shrubs, perennial, annual terrestrial, marsh and aquatic herbs with global distribution, but especially Australia. It consists of 9–11 genera and about 145 species. The largest genus is Gonocarpus with about 40 species. The major horticultural genus is Myriophyllum (watermilfoil) whose species are valued as aquaria and pond plants but may escape and naturalise, becoming invasive. Some cultivars of Haloragis are valued as ornamentals. Only one genus, Haloragodendron, is a shrub and is confined to S Australia. The family and nominative genus, Haloragis are named from the Greek words halas (salt) and rhoges (berries).

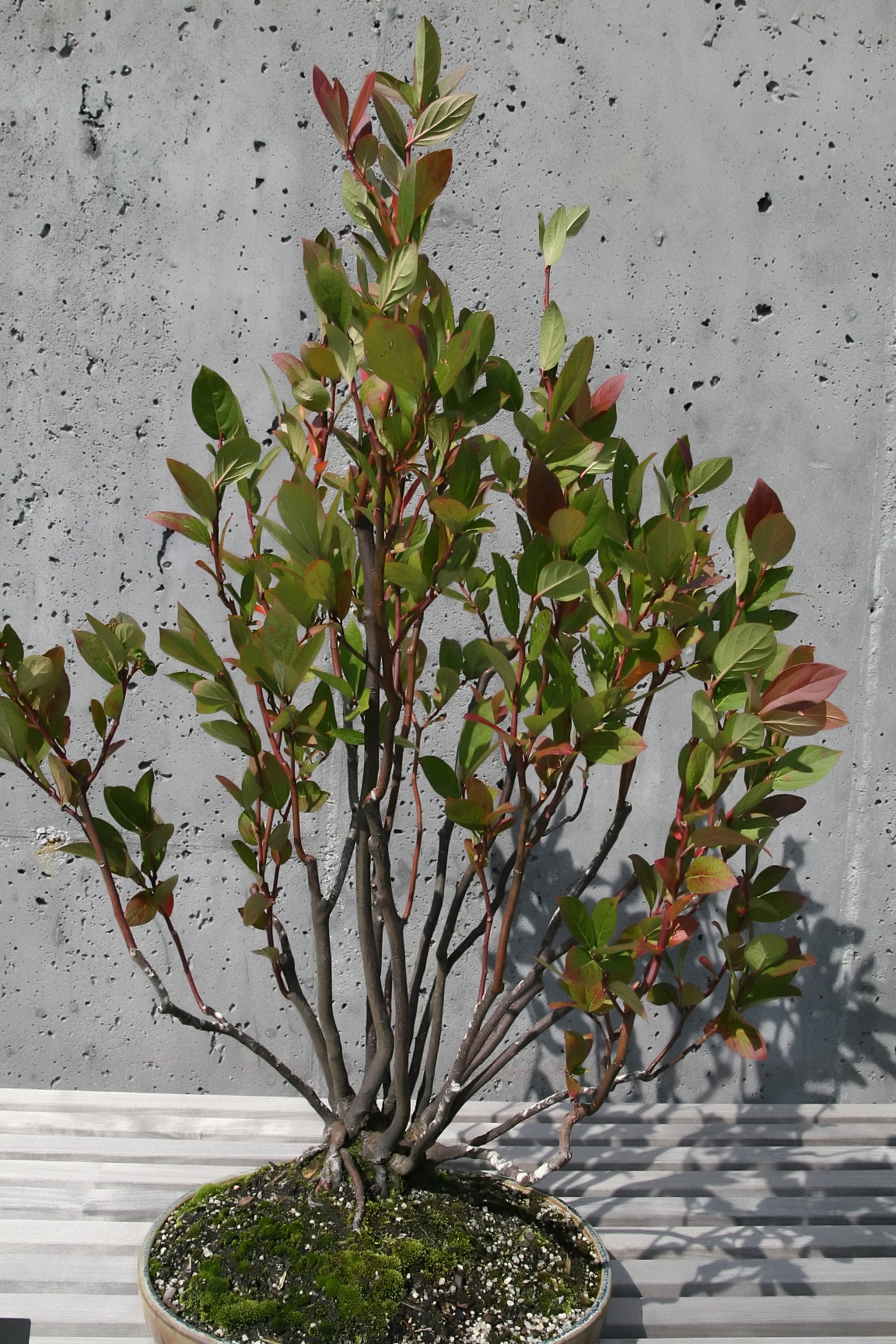
Itea virginica

==== Iteaceae ====
The Iteaceae (Sweetspire family) is a widespread small family of trees and shrubs, with 2 genera, and 18–21 species, found in tropical to northern temperate regions. The larger genus, Itea (c. 16 spp.) is more widespread, from the Himalayas to Japan and western Malesia and one species in eastern N America (I. virginica) whereas Pterostemon (c. 2 spp) is confined to Oaxaca, Mexico. I. virginica and I. ilicifolia, from China, are valued as ornamental shrubs. The name is derived from the Greek word itea (willow) for its rapid growth and similar leaf form.

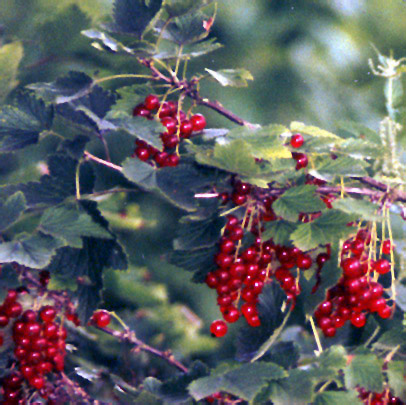
Ribes rubrum

==== Grossulariaceae ====
The Grossulariaceae (Gooseberry family) are shrubs that are usually deciduous. The single genus, Ribes, has about 150 species that are commercially important and widely cultivated for their fruit and also grown as ornamentals, such as R. uva-crispa (gooseberry) and R. nigrum (blackcurrant). They are found in temperate northern hemisphere regions but extending through the Andes into S America. The family name is derived from the Latin word grossulus (an unripe fig), and Ribes is Latinised from the semitic word ribas (acid taste).

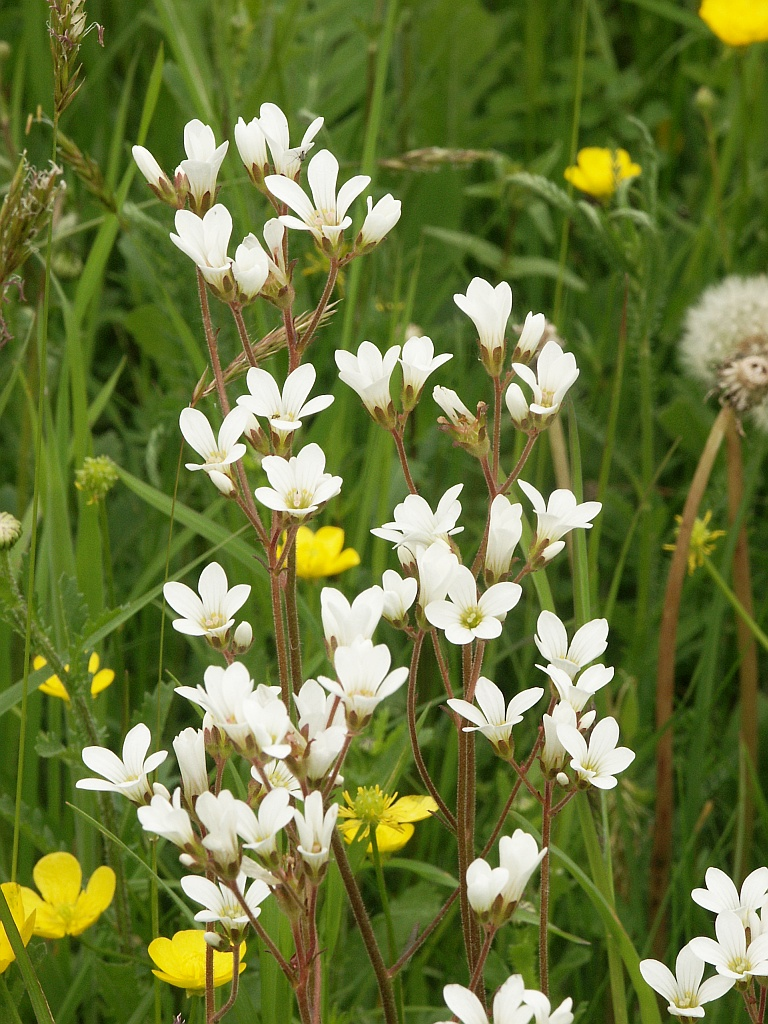
Saxifraga granulata

==== Saxifragaceae ====
The Saxifragaceae (Saxifrage family) are mainly perennial herbs distributed throughout the Northern Hemisphere and Andes, and New Guinea, in damp woodlands and cooler northern regions, rarely aquatic, but are adapted to a wide range of moisture conditions. The family, greatly reduced, includes 35 genera and about 640 species, in two lineages, saxifragoids (e.g. Saxifraga, rockfoil) and heucheroids (e.g. Heuchera, coral bells). The largest genus is Saxifraga, the type genus (370 species), though several genera are monotypic. Saxifragaceae are the most horticulturally important of the herbaceous Saxifragales. They provide foodstuffs and medicaments and include many ornamentals, particularly of border, rock and woodland gardens, such as Astilbe, though the largest number of cultivated species belong to Saxifraga. The family and type genus name are derived from the two Latin words saxum (rock), and frango (to break), but the exact origin is unknown, although surmised to be either because of the ability of Saxifraga to grow in crevices in rocks or medicinal use for kidney stones.

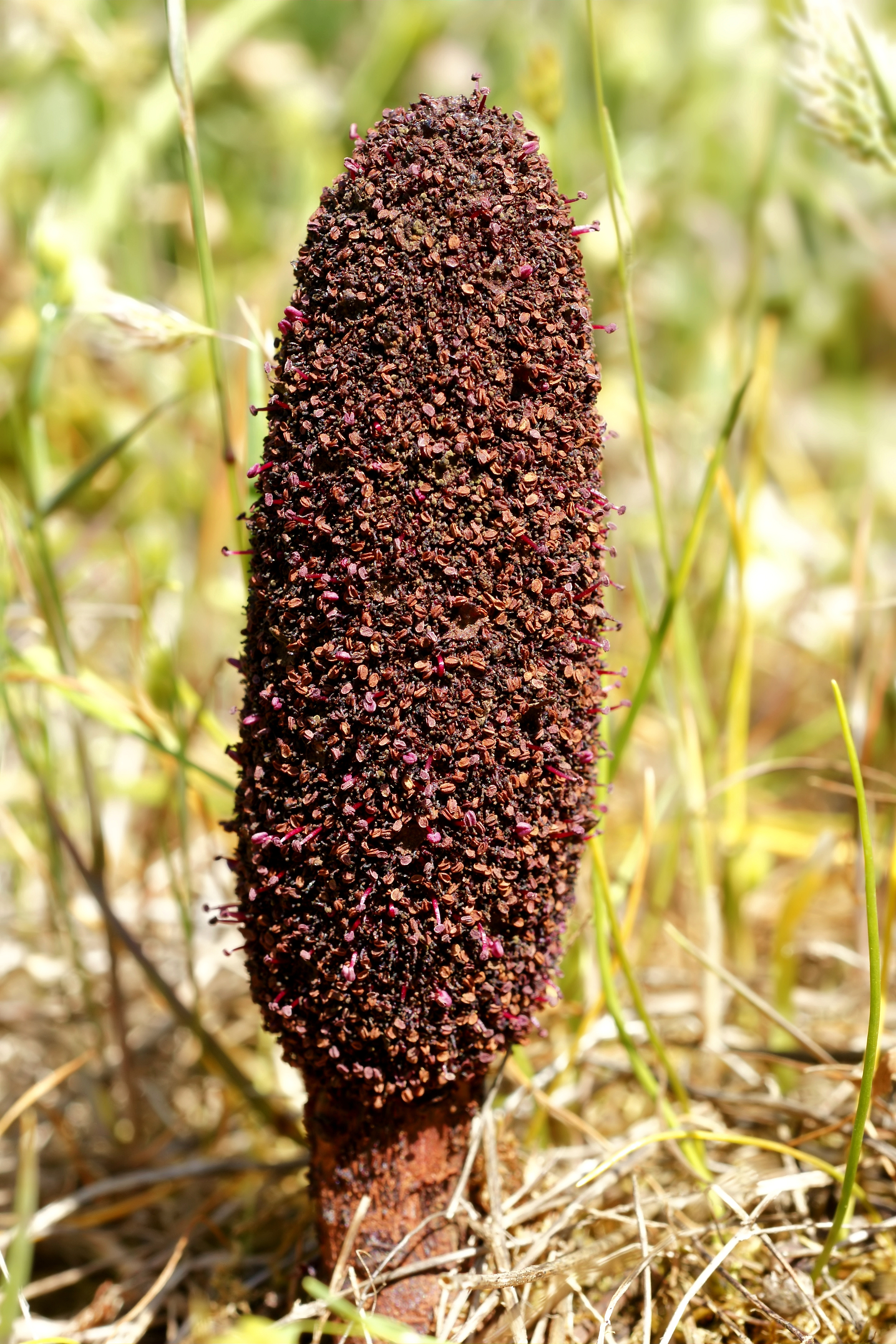
Cynomorium coccineum

==== Cynomoriaceae ====
The Cynomoriaceae (Tarthuth or Maltese Mushroom family) consists of a single genus, Cynomorium with one or two species, C. coccineum (Mediterranean basin) and C. songaricum (central Asia and China; sometimes treated as a variety of C. coccineum). They are perennial bisexual herbaceous parasitic plants lacking chlorophyll, from deserts and arid regions. They have been harvested for food, as a dye and in traditional medicine. The name is derived from two Greek words kynos (dog), and morion (penis), for its shape.

== Distribution and habitat ==
Saxifragales are found worldwide, though primarily in temperate zones and rarely in the tropics. They occupy a wide variety of habitats from arid desert (Crassulaceae) to aquatic conditions (Haloragaceae), with 6 families, including North American species, that are obligate aquatic (fully dependent on an aquatic environment), and including forests, grasslands and tundra. Saxifragales exceeds all other comparably sized clades in terms of diversity of habitats. Most of the diversity occurs in temperate (including montane and arid) conditions that expanded globally during cooling and drying trends in the last 15 My.

The most common habitats are forests and cliffs, with about 300 species occupying each, but with forests being the most diverse phenotypically, where nearly all families are represented. In contrast, desert and tundra, with only two families each, contain only about 10% of species. About 90% of species can be assigned to a single habitat.

== Conservation ==
Whittonia (Peridiscaceae) is thought to be extinct. As of 2019 the IUCN lists 9 critically endangered, 12 endangered, 19 vulnerable and 7 near threatened species. Among the most threatened Saxifragales are Aichryson dumosum and Monanthes wildpretii (Crassulaceae), Haloragis stokesii and Myriophyllum axilliflorum (Haloragaceae), Ribes malvifolium and R. sardoum (Grossulariaceae), Saxifraga artvinensis (Saxifragaceae) and Molinadendron hondurense (Hamamelidaceae).

== Cultivation ==
A number of Saxifragales genera are commercially cultivated. Paeonia are cultivated both as ornamental shrubs (generally sold as root stock) and for cut flowers, with the Netherlands representing the largest production, other more minor producers are Israel, New Zealand, Chile and the United States. Liquidambar is used for hardwood, with the American sweetgum (Liquidambar styraciflua) being among the most important sources of commercial hardwood in the Southeast United States, with one of its uses being veneer for plywood. Hamamelis is cultivated in New England for distilleries extracting witch-hazel, widely used in skincare, and is the largest source of this medicament in the world. Among the Crassulaceae, economic importance is limited to horticulture, with many species and cultivars important as ornamentals, including Crassula ovata (jade plant) and Jovibarba (hen and chicken). Hylotelphium, Phedimus, Sedum and Sempervivum are cultivated for rock gardens and for "green roofs". In particular, cultivars of the Madagascan Kalanchoe blossfeldiana, e.g. 'Florists kalanchoe' have achieved commercial success throughout the world, being popular Christmas decorative plants. The Haloragaceae aquatic genus Myriophyllum and the closely related Proserpinaca are cultivated for the commercial aquarium trade. Myriophyllum is also economically important for purification of water and as feed for pigs, ducks, and fish, and polishing wood.

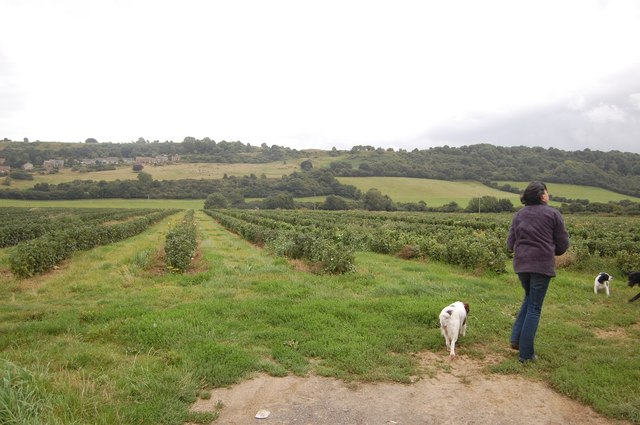
Blackcurrant crops, UK

A number of Ribes (Grossulariaceae) are in commercial production, concentrated in Europe and the USSR from species native to those areas. R. nigrum (blackcurrant) was first cultivated in monastery gardens in Russia in the 11th century, and currant cultivation more generally later in Western Europe, R. uva-crispa (gooseberry) production began around 1700. The first colonists in North America began cultivating currants in the late 1700s. R. nigrum is the most important commercial currant crop, being produced in more than 23 countries, with the major centres being Russia (more than 63 thousand hectares), Poland, Germany, Scandinavia and the UK. An important source of Vitamin C, black currants are used in the manufacture of jam, fruit jelly, compote, syrup, juice and other drinks, including the cordial Ribena and the liqueur Cassis. Other commercial crops include R. rubrum (red currant). World Ribes crop production was over 750,000 tons in 2002, of which about 150,000 tons were gooseberries, and the largest group blackcurrants.

== Uses ==
Plants in the order Saxifragales have found a wide variety of uses, including traditional medicines, ornamental, household, aquarium, pond and garden plants, spices, foodstuffs (fruit and greens), dyestuffs, smoking, resin, timber, and roof coverings.

== See also ==
- List of Saxifragales, Vitales and Zygophyllales families

== Bibliography ==
=== Books ===
- Brennan, Rex M. (1996). "Currants and Gooseberries". In Janick, Jules; Moore, James N. (eds.). Fruit Breeding. II: Vine and small fruits. Wiley. pp. 191–298. ISBN 978-0-471-12670-6.
- Brennan, Rex M. (2008). "Currants and gooseberries". In Janick, Jules; Paull, Robert E. (eds.). The Encyclopedia of Fruit and Nuts. CABI. ISBN 978-0-85199-638-7.
- Brennan, R. M. (2008b). "Currants and Gooseberries". In Hancock, Jim F. (ed.). Temperate Fruit Crop Breeding. Springer Science & Business Media. pp. 177–196. doi:10.1007/978-1-4020-6907-9_6. ISBN 978-1-4020-6907-9.
- Byng, James W. (2014). "Saxifragales". The Flowering Plants Handbook: A practical guide to families and genera of the world. Plant Gateway Ltd. pp. 156–166. ISBN 978-0-9929993-1-5.
- Christenhusz, Maarten J. M.; Fay, Michael F.; Chase, Mark W. (2017). "Saxifragales". Plants of the World: An Illustrated Encyclopedia of Vascular Plants. University of Chicago Press. pp. 231–244. ISBN 978-0-226-52292-0.
- Earle, A. Scott; Lundin, Jane (2012). ". Stonecrop Family: Crassulaceae". Idaho Mountain Wildflowers (3rd ed.). Larkspur Books.
- Engler, A. (1930). "Saxifragaceae". In Engler, Adolf; Prantl, Karl Anton (eds.). Die Natürlichen Pflanzenfamilien. Vol. 18A. Leipzig: Verlag von Wilhelm Engelmann. pp. 74–226.
- Goldstein, Robert Jay; Harper, Rodney W.; Edwards, Richard (2000). "Haloragaceae". American Aquarium Fishes. Texas A&M University Press. p. 32. ISBN 978-0-89096-880-2.
- Halda, Josef J.; Waddick, James W. (2010) [2004]. The Genus Paeonia. Oregon: Timber Press. ISBN 978-1-60469-246-4.
- Kubitzki, Klaus, ed. (2004). Flowering Plants. Dicotyledons: Celastrales, Oxalidales, Rosales, Cornales, Ericales. The Families and Genera of Vascular Plants. Vol. VI. Springer. doi:10.1007/978-3-662-07257-8. ISBN 978-3-662-07257-8. S2CID 12809916.
- Kubitzki, Klaus, ed. (2007). Flowering Plants. Eudicots: Berberidopsidales, Buxales, Crossosomatales, Fabales p.p., Geraniales, Gunnerales, Myrtales p.p., Proteales, Saxifragales, Vitales, Zygophyllales, Clusiaceae Alliance, Passifloraceae Alliance, Dilleniaceae, Huaceae, Picramniaceae, Sabiaceae. The Families and Genera of Vascular Plants. Vol. IX. Springer. ISBN 978-3-540-32219-1.
- Les, Donald H. (2017). Aquatic Dicotyledons of North America: Ecology, Life History, and Systematics. CRC Press. ISBN 978-1-351-64440-2.
- Mabberley, D. J. (2008). Mabberley's Plant-book: A Portable Dictionary of Plants, Their Classification and Uses. Cambridge University Press. ISBN 978-0-521-82071-4.
- Peterson, Michael E.; Talcott, Patricia A. (2012). Small Animal Toxicology. Elsevier Health Sciences. ISBN 978-1-4557-0717-1.
- Singh, Gurcharan (2004). Plant Systematics: An Integrated Approach (3rd ed.). Science Publishers. ISBN 1578083516.
- Smith, Gideon F.; Figueiredo, Estrela; Wyk, Abraham E. van (2019). Kalanchoe (Crassulaceae) in Southern Africa: Classification, Biology, and Cultivation. Elsevier Science. ISBN 978-0-12-814008-6.
- Soltis, Douglas; Soltis, Pamela; Endress, Peter; et al. (2018) [2005]. "Superrosids". Phylogeny and Evolution of the Angiosperms: Revised and Updated Edition. University of Chicago Press. pp. 191–246. ISBN 978-0-226-44175-7.

Chapters

- Bradford, Jason C.; Fortune-Hopkins, Helen C.; Barnes, Richard W. "Cunoniaceae". In Kubitzki (2004), pp. 91–111.
- Kubitzki, Klaus (2007a). "Introduction to Saxifragales". In Kubitzki (2007), pp. 15–18.
- Thiede, Joachim; Eggli, Urs. "Crassulaceae". In Kubitzki (2007), pp. 83–119. (full text at ResearchGate)
- Kubitzki, Klaus (2007b). "Daphniphyllaceae". In Kubitzki (2007), pp. 127–128.
- Kubitzki, Klaus (2007c). "Haloragaceae". In Kubitzki (2007), pp. 184–190.
- Kubitzki, Klaus (2007d). "Iteaceae". In Kubitzki (2007), pp. 202–204.
- Tamura, Michio. "Paeoniaceae". In Kubitzki (2007), pp. 265–269.
- Thiede, Joachim. "Penthoraceae". In Kubitzki (2007), pp. 292–296.
- Gwaltney-Brant, Sharon M. "Christmastime Plants". In Peterson & Talcott (2012), pp. 419–512.

Historical

- Berchtold, Friedrich von; Presl, Jan Svatopluk (1820). O Přirozenosti Rostlin. Prague: Krala Wiljma Endersa.
- Dumortier, Barthélemy-Charles (1829). Analyse des familles des plantes: avec l'indication des principaux genres qui s'y rattachent (in French). Tournay: Casterman.
- Lindley, John (1853) [1846]. The Vegetable Kingdom: or, The structure, classification, and uses of plants, illustrated upon the natural system (3rd ed.). London: Bradbury & Evans.

=== Articles ===
- Berry, Paul (22 November 2017). Saxifragales. Encyclopædia Britannica.
- Christenhusz, Maarten JM & Byng, J. W. (2016). "The number of known plants species in the world and its annual increase". Phytotaxa. 261 (3). Magnolia Press: 201–217. Bibcode:2016Phytx.261..201C. doi:10.11646/phytotaxa.261.3.1.

Angiosperms

- Burleigh, J. Gordon; Hilu, Khidir W.; Soltis, Douglas E. (2009). "Inferring phylogenies with incomplete data sets: a 5-gene, 567-taxon analysis of angiosperms". BMC Evolutionary Biology. 9 (1): 61. Bibcode:2009BMCEE...9...61B. doi:10.1186/1471-2148-9-61. PMC 2674047. PMID 19292928.
- Li, Hong-Tao; Yi, Ting-Shuang; Gao, Lian-Ming; Ma, Peng-Fei; Zhang, Ting; Yang, Jun-Bo; Gitzendanner, Matthew A.; Fritsch, Peter W.; Cai, Jie; Luo, Yang; Wang, Hong; van der Bank, Michelle; Zhang, Shu-Dong; Wang, Qing-Feng; Wang, Jian; Zhang, Zhi-Rong; Fu, Chao-Nan; Yang, Jing; Hollingsworth, Peter M.; Chase, Mark W.; Soltis, Douglas E.; Soltis, Pamela S.; Li, De-Zhu (6 May 2019). "Origin of angiosperms and the puzzle of the Jurassic gap". Nature Plants. 5 (5): 461–470. Bibcode:2019NatPl...5..461L. doi:10.1038/s41477-019-0421-0. PMID 31061536. S2CID 146118264.
- Tank, David C.; Eastman, Jonathan M.; Pennell, Matthew W.; Soltis, Pamela S.; Soltis, Douglas E.; Hinchliff, Cody E.; Brown, Joseph W.; Sessa, Emily B.; Harmon, Luke J. (4 June 2015). "Nested radiations and the pulse of angiosperm diversification: increased diversification rates often follow whole genome duplications". New Phytologist. 207 (2): 454–467. Bibcode:2015NewPh.207..454T. doi:10.1111/nph.13491. hdl:2027.42/111924. PMID 26053261.
- Wang, Hengchang; Moore, Michael J.; Soltis, Pamela S.; Bell, Charles D.; Brockington, Samuel F.; Alexandre, Roolse; Davis, Charles C.; Latvis, Maribeth; Manchester, Steven R.; Soltis, Douglas E. (10 March 2009). "Rosid radiation and the rapid rise of angiosperm-dominated forests". Proceedings of the National Academy of Sciences. 106 (10): 3853–8. Bibcode:2009PNAS..106.3853W. doi:10.1073/pnas.0813376106. PMC 2644257. PMID 19223592.
- Wurdack, Kenneth J.; Davis, Charles C. (August 2009). "Malpighiales phylogenetics: Gaining ground on one of the most recalcitrant clades in the angiosperm tree of life". American Journal of Botany. 96 (8): 1551–70. Bibcode:2009AmJB...96.1551W. doi:10.3732/ajb.0800207. PMID 21628300. S2CID 23284896.

Eudicots

- Moore, M. J.; Soltis, P. S.; Bell, C. D.; Burleigh, J. G.; Soltis, D. E. (22 February 2010). "Phylogenetic analysis of 83 plastid genes further resolves the early diversification of eudicots". Proceedings of the National Academy of Sciences. 107 (10): 4623–4628. Bibcode:2010PNAS..107.4623M. doi:10.1073/pnas.0907801107. PMC 2842043. PMID 20176954.
- Wang, Wei; Lu, An-Ming; Ren, Yi; Endress, Mary E.; Chen, Zhi-Duan (January 2009). "Phylogeny and classification of Ranunculales: Evidence from four molecular loci and morphological data". Perspectives in Plant Ecology, Evolution and Systematics. 11 (2): 81–110. Bibcode:2009PPEES..11...81W. doi:10.1016/j.ppees.2009.01.001.
- Worberg, Andreas; Quandt, Dietmar; Anna-, Anna-Magdalena; Barniske, Magdalena; Löhne, Cornelia; Hilu, Khidir W.; Borsch, Thomas (2007). "Phylogeny of basal eudicots: Insights from non-coding and rapidly evolving DNA". Organisms Diversity & Evolution. 7 (1): 55–77. Bibcode:2007ODivE...7...55W. doi:10.1016/j.ode.2006.08.001.
- Zeng, Liping; Zhang, Ning; Zhang, Qiang; Endress, Peter K.; Huang, Jie; Ma, Hong (May 2017). "Resolution of deep eudicot phylogeny and their temporal diversification using nuclear genes from transcriptomic and genomic datasets". New Phytologist. 214 (3): 1338–1354. Bibcode:2017NewPh.214.1338Z. doi:10.1111/nph.14503. PMID 28294342.

Saxifragales

- Carlsward, Barbara S.; Judd, Walter S.; Soltis, Douglas E.; Manchester, Steven; Soltis, Pamela S. (2011). "Putative Morphological Synapomorphies of Saxifragales and Their Major Subclades". Journal of the Botanical Research Institute of Texas. 5 (1): 179–196. ISSN 1934-5259. JSTOR 41972505.
- de Casas, Rafael Rubio; Mort, Mark E.; Soltis, Douglas E. (December 2016). "The influence of habitat on the evolution of plants: a case study across Saxifragales". Annals of Botany. 118 (7): 1317–1328. doi:10.1093/aob/mcw160. PMC 5155595. PMID 27551029.
- Fishbein, Mark; Hibsch-Jetter, Carola; Soltis, Douglas E.; Hufford, Larry; Baum, D. (1 November 2001). "Phylogeny of Saxifragales (Angiosperms, Eudicots): Analysis of a Rapid, Ancient Radiation". Systematic Biology. 50 (6): 817–847. doi:10.1080/106351501753462821. PMID 12116635.
- Fishbein, Mark; Soltis, Douglas E. (2004). "Further Resolution of the Rapid Radiation of Saxifragales (Angiosperms, Eudicots) Supported by Mixed-Model Bayesian Analysis". Systematic Botany. 29 (4): 883–891. Bibcode:2004SysBo..29..883F. doi:10.1600/0363644042450982. ISSN 0363-6445. JSTOR 25064018. S2CID 85765481.
- Folk, Ryan A.; Stubbs, Rebecca L.; Mort, Mark E.; Cellinese, Nico; Allen, Julie M.; Soltis, Pamela S.; Soltis, Douglas E.; Guralnick, Robert P. (28 May 2019). "Rates of niche and phenotype evolution lag behind diversification in a temperate radiation". Proceedings of the National Academy of Sciences. 116 (22): 10874–10882. Bibcode:2019PNAS..11610874F. doi:10.1073/pnas.1817999116. PMC 6561174. PMID 31085636.
- Ding, Hengwu; Zhu, Ran; Dong, Jinxiu; Bi, De; Jiang, Lan; Zeng, Juhua; Huang, Qingyu; Liu, Huan; Xu, Wenzhong; Wu, Longhua; Kan, Xianzhao (29 September 2019). "Next-Generation Genome Sequencing of Sedum plumbizincicola Sheds Light on the Structural Evolution of Plastid rRNA Operon and Phylogenetic Implications within Saxifragales". Plants. 8 (10): 386. Bibcode:2019Plnts...8..386D. doi:10.3390/plants8100386. PMC 6843225. PMID 31569538.
- Dong, Wenpan; Xu, Chao; Wu, Ping; Cheng, Tao; Yu, Jing; Zhou, Shiliang; Hong, De-Yuan (September 2018). "Resolving the systematic positions of enigmatic taxa: Manipulating the chloroplast genome data of Saxifragales". Molecular Phylogenetics and Evolution. 126: 321–330. Bibcode:2018MolPE.126..321D. doi:10.1016/j.ympev.2018.04.033. PMID 29702217. S2CID 19094509.
- Jian, Shuguang; Soltis, Pamela S.; Gitzendanner, Matthew A.; Moore, Michael J.; Li, Ruiqi; Hendry, Tory A.; Qiu, Yin-Long; Dhingra, Amit; Bell, Charles D.; Soltis, Douglas E. (February 2008). "Resolving an ancient, rapid radiation in Saxifragales". Systematic Biology. 57 (1): 38–57. doi:10.1080/10635150801888871. PMID 18275001. S2CID 3338814.
- Soltis, D. E.; Mort, M. E.; Latvis, M.; Mavrodiev, E. V.; O'Meara, B. C.; Soltis, P. S.; Burleigh, J. G.; Rubio de Casas, R. (29 April 2013). "Phylogenetic relationships and character evolution analysis of Saxifragales using a supermatrix approach". American Journal of Botany. 100 (5): 916–929. Bibcode:2013AmJB..100..916S. doi:10.3732/ajb.1300044. PMID 23629845.

==== APG ====
- Angiosperm Phylogeny Group (1998), "An ordinal classification for the families of flowering plants", Annals of the Missouri Botanical Garden, 85 (4): 531–553, Bibcode:1998AnMBG..85..531., doi:10.2307/2992015, JSTOR 2992015
- Angiosperm Phylogeny Group II (2003), "An update of the Angiosperm Phylogeny Group classification for the orders and families of flowering plants: APG II" (PDF), Botanical Journal of the Linnean Society, 141 (4), Bremer, B., K. Bremer, M.W. Chase, J.L. Reveal, D.E. Soltis, P.S. Soltis & P.F. Stevens: 399–436, doi:10.1046/j.1095-8339.2003.t01-1-00158.x, archived from the original (PDF) on 2020-10-22
- Angiosperm Phylogeny Group III (2009), "An update of the Angiosperm Phylogeny Group classification for the orders and families of flowering plants: APG III", Botanical Journal of the Linnean Society, 161 (2), Bremer, B., K. Bremer, M.W. Chase, M.F. Fay, J.L. Reveal, D.E. Soltis, P.S. Soltis & P.F. Stevens: 105–121, doi:10.1111/j.1095-8339.2009.00996.x, hdl:10654/18083
- Angiosperm Phylogeny Group IV (2016). "An update of the Angiosperm Phylogeny Group classification for the orders and families of flowering plants: APG IV". Botanical Journal of the Linnean Society. 181 (1): 1–20. doi:10.1111/boj.12385. S2CID 7498637.

==== Saxifragales families ====
- Auer, James D.; Greenberg, Joshua (June 2009). "Peonies: An Economic Background for Alaska Flower Growers" (PDF). SNRAS/AFES Miscellaneous Publication MP 2009-08. School of Natural Resources & Agricultural Resources, University of Alaska, Fairbanks.
- Bellot, Sidonie; Cusimano, Natalie; Luo, Shixiao; Sun, Guiling; Zarre, Shahin; Gröger, Andreas; Temsch, Eva; Renner, Susanne S. (July 2016). "Assembled Plastid and Mitochondrial Genomes, as well as Nuclear Genes, Place the Parasite Family Cynomoriaceae in the Saxifragales". Genome Biology and Evolution. 8 (7): 2214–2230. doi:10.1093/gbe/evw147. PMC 4987112. PMID 27358425.
- Davis, Charles C.; Chase, Mark W. (2004). "Elatinaceae are sister to Malpighiaceae; Peridiscaceae belong to Saxifragales" (PDF). American Journal of Botany. 91 (2): 262–273. doi:10.3732/ajb.91.2.262. hdl:2027.42/141309. PMID 21653382. S2CID 6325727.
- Dickison, William C.; Hils, Matthew H.; Lucansky, Terry W.; William Louis, Stern (1994). "Comparative anatomy and systematics of woody Saxifragaceae: Aphanopetalum". Botanical Journal of the Linnean Society. 114 (2): 167–182. doi:10.1111/j.1095-8339.1994.tb01930.x.
- Endress, Peter K. (1986). "Floral structure, systematics and phylogeny in Trochodendrales". Annals of the Missouri Botanical Garden. 73 (2): 297–324. Bibcode:1986AnMBG..73..297E. doi:10.2307/2399115. JSTOR 2399115.
- Endress, Peter K. (1989). "Aspects of evolutionary differentiation of the Hamamelidaceae and the Lower Hamamelididae". Plant Systematics and Evolution. 162 (1–4): 193–211. Bibcode:1989PSyEv.162..193E. doi:10.1007/BF00936917. S2CID 45506515.
- Gapinski, Andrew (2014). "Hamamelidaceae, Part 1: Exploring the Witch-hazels of the Arnold Arboretum" (PDF). Arnoldia. 72 (2): 2–17. doi:10.5962/p.253579. Archived from the original (PDF) on 2020-01-03.
- Hils, Matthew H.; Dickison, William C.; Lucansky, Terry W.; William Louis, Stern (1988). "Comparative anatomy and systematics of woody Saxifragaceae: Tetracarpaea". American Journal of Botany. 75 (11): 1687–1700. doi:10.2307/2444685. JSTOR 2444685.
- Ickert-Bond, Stephanie M.; Wen, Jun (2006). "Phylogeny and biogeography of Altingiaceae: Evidence from combined analysis of five non-coding chloroplast regions". Molecular Phylogenetics and Evolution. 39 (2): 512–528. Bibcode:2006MolPE..39..512I. doi:10.1016/j.ympev.2005.12.003. PMID 16439163.
- Ickert-Bond, Stefanie; Wen, Jun (17 December 2013). "A taxonomic synopsis of Altingiaceae with nine new combinations". PhytoKeys (31): 21–61. Bibcode:2013PhytK..31...21I. doi:10.3897/phytokeys.31.6251. PMC 3881344. PMID 24399902.
- Moody, Michael L.; Les, Donald H. (2007). "Phylogenetic systematics and character evolution in the angiosperm family Haloragaceae". American Journal of Botany. 94 (12): 2005–2025. Bibcode:2007AmJB...94.2005M. doi:10.3732/ajb.94.12.2005. PMID 21636395.
- Soltis, Douglas E.; Soltis, Pamela S. (April 1997). "Phylogenetic relationships in Saxifragaceae sensu lato: a comparison of topologies based on 18S rDNA and rbcL sequences". American Journal of Botany. 84 (4): 504–522. Bibcode:1997AmJB...84..504S. doi:10.2307/2446027. JSTOR 2446027. PMID 21708603.
- Soltis, Douglas E.; Kuzoff, Robert K.; Mort, Mark E.; Zanis, Michael; Fishbein, Mark; Hufford, Larry; Koontz, Jason; Arroyo, Mary K. (2001). "Elucidating deep-level phylogenetic relationships in Saxifragaceae using sequences for six chloroplastic and nuclear DNA regions". Annals of the Missouri Botanical Garden. 88 (4): 669–693. Bibcode:2001AnMBG..88..669S. doi:10.2307/3298639. JSTOR 3298639. S2CID 88444605.
- Soltis, Douglas E.; Clayton, Joshua W.; Davis, Charles C.; Gitzendanner, Matthew A.; Cheek, Martin; Savolainen, Vincent; Amorim, André M.; Soltis, Pamela S. (2007). "Monophyly and relationships of the enigmatic family Peridiscaceae". Taxon. 56 (1): 65–73. Bibcode:2007Taxon..56...65S. doi:10.2307/25065736. JSTOR 25065736.
- Tseng-Chieng, Huang (1965). "Monograph of Daphniphyllum (I)". Taiwania. 11 (1): 57–98. doi:10.6165/tai.1965.11.57. Archived from the original on 2018-04-26.
- Tseng-Chieng, Huang (1966). "Monograph of Daphniphyllum (II)". Taiwania. 12 (1): 137–234. doi:10.6165/tai.1966.12.137. Archived from the original on 2018-04-25.

==== Paleontology ====
- Crane, Peter R. (1989). "Paleobotanical evidence on the early radiation of nonmagnoliid dicotyledons". Plant Systematics and Evolution. 162 (1–4): 165–191. Bibcode:1989PSyEv.162..165C. doi:10.1007/BF00936916. S2CID 19163148.
- Hermsen, Elizabeth J.; Gandolfo, María A.; Nixon, Kevin C.; Crepet, William L. (2003). "Divisestylus genus novus (Affinity Iteaceae), a fossil saxifrage from the Late Cretaceous of New Jersey, USA". American Journal of Botany. 90 (9): 1373–1388. doi:10.3732/ajb.90.9.1373. PMID 21659237.
- Hermsen, Elizabeth J.; Gandolfo, María A.; Nixon, Kevin C.; Crepet, William L. (2006). "The impact of extinct taxa on understanding the early evolution of angiosperm clades: An example incorporating fossil reproductive structures of Saxifragales". Plant Systematics and Evolution. 260 (2–4): 141–169. Bibcode:2006PSyEv.260..141H. doi:10.1007/s00606-006-0441-x. S2CID 24956887.
- Hernández-Castillo, Genaro R.; Cevallos-Ferriz, Sergio R.S. (1999). "Reproductive and vegetative organs with affinities to Haloragaceae from the Upper Cretaceous Huepac Chert Locality of Sonora, Mexico". American Journal of Botany. 86 (12): 1717–1734. Bibcode:1999AmJB...86.1717H. doi:10.2307/2656670. JSTOR 2656670. PMID 10602765.
- Pigg, Kathleen B.; Ickert-Bond, Stephanie M.; Wen, Jun (2004). "Anatomically preserved Liquidambar (Altingiaceae) from the middle Miocene of Yakima Canyon, Washington State, USA, and its biogeographic implications". American Journal of Botany. 91 (3): 499–509. Bibcode:2004AmJB...91..499P. doi:10.3732/ajb.91.3.499. PMID 21653405.

=== Websites ===
- Brennan, Rex M. (2008a). "Currants and Gooseberries / Ribes species / Saxifragaceae" (PDF).
- Cole, Theodor C. H.; Hilger, Hartmut H.; Stevens, Peter F. (May 2019), Angiosperm Phylogeny: Flowering Plant Systematics, doi:10.7287/peerj.preprints.2320v6
- Kormanik, Paul P. (1990). "Liquidambar styraciflua L. - Silvics of North America". Forest*A*Syst. Warnell School of Forestry & Natural Resources & College of Agricultural & Environmental Sciences, The University of Georgia.
- Stevens, P.F. (2019) [2001]. "Saxifragales". AP Web v. 14. Missouri Botanical Garden. (see also Angiosperm Phylogeny Website)
- Soltis, D; Soltis, P; Arakaki, M (2006). "Saxifragales". Tree of Life.
- WFO (2019). "Saxifragales Bercht. & J.Presl". World Flora Online.
- IUCN (2019). "Saxifragales". Red List of Threatened Species. IUCN., see also IUCN Red List
- Chen, Jiarui; Funston, Michele (2004). "Haloragaceae". pp. 427–428., in Flora of China online vol. 13
- Gros d'Aillon, Francois (5 April 2016). "Ribes Linaeus". A small Flore of Rosemère surroundings. Archived from the original on 6 December 2019.
- Doronina, A.Ju.; Terekhina, N.V. (2009). "AgroAtlas - Crops - Ribes nigrum L. - European black currant". Interactive Agricultural Ecological Atlas of Russia and Neighboring Countries. Economic Plants and their Diseases, Pests and Weeds.
- Johansson, Jan Thomas (2013). "Saxifragales Dumortier". The Phylogeny of Angiosperms.

Images

- "Pterostemon mexicanus". Plants of the World Online (Photograph: glandular dentate leaf margins). Royal Botanic Gardens, Kew. 2017.
