= List of Saxifragales, Vitales and Zygophyllales families =

Plant taxonomical classifications

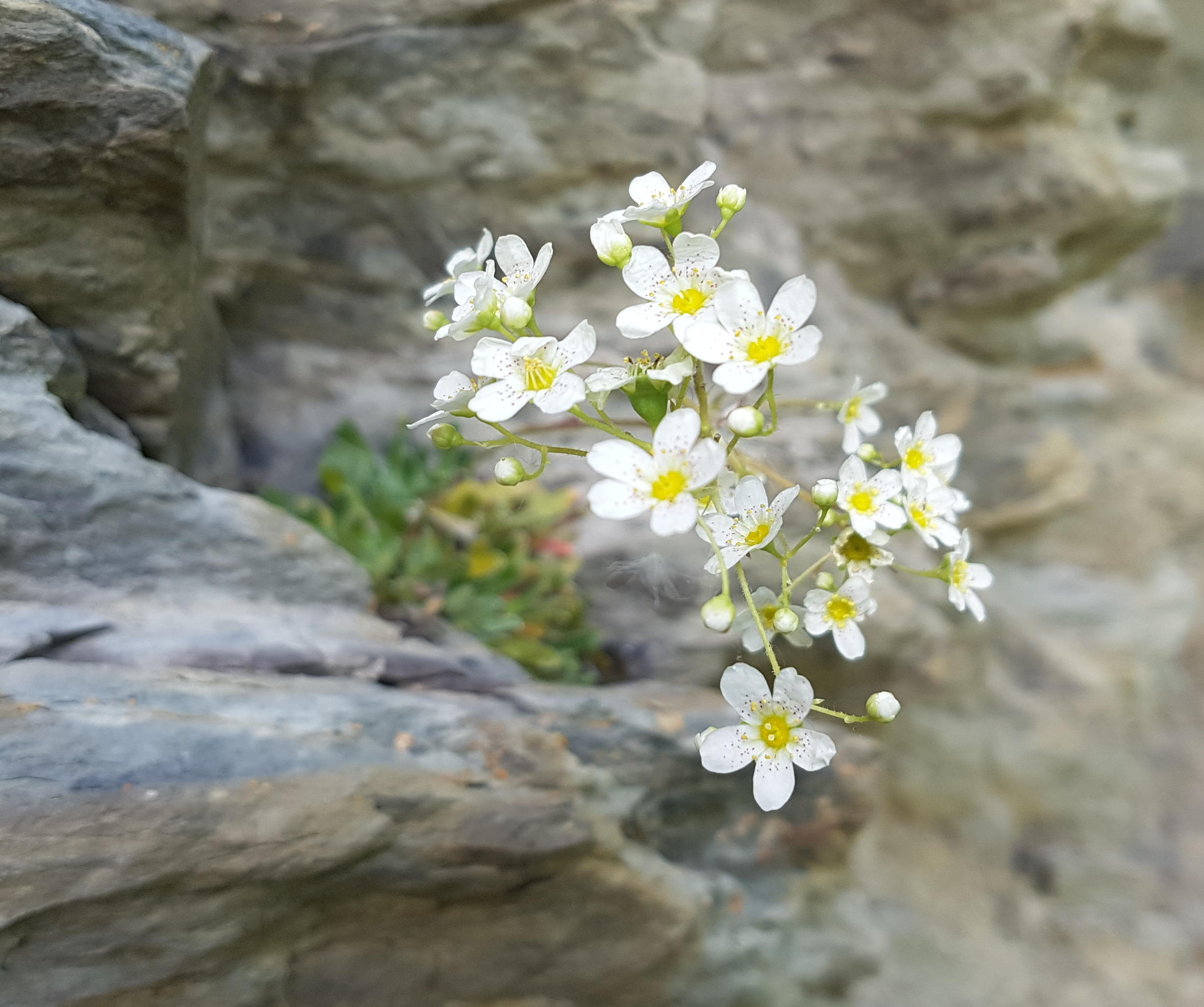
Saxifraga, from Latin for "stone-breaking"

Saxifragales, Vitales and Zygophyllales are three orders of flowering plants with a total of 18 families. (Note: The taxonomy (classification) in this list follows Plants of the World (2017) and the fourth Angiosperm Phylogeny Group system. Total counts of genera for each family come from Plants of the World Online. (See the POWO license.) Extinct taxa are not included.) They belong to the superrosids, a group of around 150 related families, including the rose family. They are the only such orders that are not included in three large subgroups of the superrosids: the COM clade, the nitrogen-fixing clade and the malvids. (Note: A clade is a subgroup of related species.)

The order Saxifragales includes fruit-bearing shrubs, woody vines, succulents, aquatics, and many ornamental trees and garden plants, including stonecrops, currants and witch-hazels. Peonies are bred by horticulturists and widely cultivated in temperate gardens. The antiseptic resin of sweetgum trees has been used as a balm since biblical times. Cercidiphyllum japonicum, the largest tree species native to Japan, is used to make boards for the game of Go. Redcurrants, rich in pectin, are used in jams and juices.

Vitales and Zygophyllales include trees, shrubs, vines and herbaceous plants. Krameria triandra is used as an astringent in mouthwash and toothpaste. Wine, juices and jellies are made from grapes, and the leaves are also edible. Guaiacum, in the twinleaf family, yields exceptionally hard lumber.

== Glossary ==
From the glossary of botanical terms:

- annual: a plant species that completes its life cycle within a single year or growing season
- basal: attached close to the base (of a plant or an evolutionary tree diagram)
- deciduous: shedding or falling seasonally, as with bark, leaves, or petals
- herbaceous: not woody; usually green and soft in texture
- perennial: not an annual or biennial
- succulent (adjective): juicy or fleshy
- unisexual: of one sex; bearing only male or only female reproductive organs
- woody: hard and lignified; not herbaceous

The APG IV system is the fourth in a series of plant taxonomies from the Angiosperm Phylogeny Group.

Saxifragales is the only superrosid order that is not also a member of the rosids. Although the Saxifragales families are quite diverse, there are a few visible traits that can be linked to many of them. The plants have relatively small seeds, except in the family Peridiscaceae. Flowers tend to have separate, unfused petals, without nectar-secreting glands. The pollen-bearing anthers are often attached by their bases. Most fruits are follicles (seed pods). There are often two distinct ovaries, each with a hypanthium, a tube or cup-like structure in a flower that includes the bases of the sepals, petals, and stamens.

== Vitales and Zygophyllales ==
Vitales and Zygophyllales families
Family and a common name	Type genus and etymology	Total genera; global distribution	Description and uses	Order	Type genus images
Krameriaceae (ratany family)	Krameria, for Wilhelm Heinrich Kramer (1724–1765), a German physician and naturalist	1 genus, in southern North America and dry parts of South America	Parasitic shrubs and herbaceous perennials	Zygophyllales	Krameria erecta
Vitaceae (grapevine family)	Vitis, from a Latin plant name	18 genera, in the tropics and warm temperate zones	Small trees, shrubs, and woody and herbaceous vines	Vitales	Vitis vinifera
Zygophyllaceae (twinleaf family)	Zygophyllum, from Greek for "yoked leaves"	22 genera, scattered worldwide, mostly in dry tropical to temperate zones	Shrubs, trees and herbaceous plants, frequently with jointed branches, sometimes with thorns	Zygophyllales	Zygophyllum fabago

== Saxifragales ==
Saxifragales families
Family and a common name (Note: Each family's formal name ends in the Latin suffix -aceae and is derived from the name of a genus that is or once was part of the family.)	Type genus and etymology	Total genera; global distribution	Description and uses	Type genus images
Altingiaceae (sweetgum family)	Liquidambar. Altingia, an earlier synonym, was named for Willem Arnold Alting (1724–1800), a Dutch colonial administrator.	1 genus, in North America and southern, eastern and Southeast Asia	Evergreen and deciduous trees. Several species are harvested for timber. The wood of L. styraciflua is used to make furniture.	Liquidambar styraciflua
Aphanopetalaceae (gum-vine family)	Aphanopetalum, from Greek for "inconspicuous petals"	1 genus, in Australia	Shrubs, some twining like vines. The stems have extensive lenticels (ruptures in the bark) for gas exchange.	Aphanopetalum resinosum
Cercidiphyllaceae (caramel-tree family)	Cercidiphyllum, from Greek for "leaves like Cercis" (that is, Cercis siliquastrum)	1 genus, in China and Japan	Deciduous trees. The autumn leaves of C. japonicum have a caramel scent.	Cercidiphyllum japonicum
Crassulaceae (stonecrop family)	Crassula, from Latin for "little thick" (leaves)	36 genera, scattered worldwide	Usually herbaceous perennials and annuals, sometimes shrubby, always with succulent stems. Some species of Crassula, Kalanchoe, Hylotelephium, Phedimus and Sempervivum are widely popular as potted ornamentals or rock garden plants. Sedum acre has been used as a pot-herb and a salad green.	Crassula perfoliata
Cynomoriaceae (tarthuth family)	Cynomorium, from Greek for "dog penis"	1 genus, in arid regions near the Mediterranean and in central and eastern Asia	Reddish-brown herbaceous parasites, lacking chlorophyll. C. coccineum has been harvested in deserts for millennia for food and dyes.	Cynomorium coccineum
Daphniphyllaceae (laurel-leaf family)	Daphniphyllum, from Greek for "leaves like Daphne"	1 genus, in southern, eastern and Southeast Asia	Unisexual evergreen shrubs and trees	Daphniphyllum macropodum
Grossulariaceae (gooseberry family)	Ribes. Grossularia, an earlier synonym, is from a Latin plant name.	1 genus, in the temperate Northern Hemisphere and South America	Usually deciduous shrubs, frequently spiny. Most species have edible fruits. Blackcurrant, redcurrant and gooseberry fruits are mixed into juices, preserves and baked goods.	Ribes rubrum (redcurrant)
Haloragaceae (water-milfoil family)	Haloragis, from Greek for "salt berries"	8 genera, distributed almost worldwide	Shrubs, small trees and herbaceous plants, growing in soil and water. Myriophyllum can be cultivated as a pond or aquarium plant.	Haloragis heterophylla
Hamamelidaceae (witch-hazel family)	Hamamelis, from a Greek plant name	26 genera, scattered worldwide	Deciduous and evergreen trees and shrubs. Some genera are common garden ornamentals, and some are harvested for furniture-making.	Hamamelis japonica
Iteaceae (sweetspire family)	Itea, from a Greek plant name	2 genera, in North America, southeastern Africa, and eastern and Southeast Asia	Shrubs and trees, usually evergreen. Three species of Itea are grown as garden ornamentals.	Itea virginica
Paeoniaceae (peony family)	Paeonia, from a Greek plant name	1 genus, in temperate western North America and throughout Eurasia	Shrubs and herbaceous perennials. They are widely cultivated as garden ornamentals. P. suffruticosa and P. lactiflora are especially popular in China and Japan.	Paeonia officinalis
Penthoraceae (ditch-stonecrop family)	Penthorum, from Greek for "five" (fruit sections)	1 genus, in eastern North America and temperate parts of East Asia	Herbaceous perennials. The plants are edible after cooking, but may have a laxative effect.	Penthorum sedoides
Peridiscaceae (ringflower family)	Peridiscus, from Greek for (stamens) "around the disk"	4 genera, in northeastern South America and West and Central Africa	Large shrubs and small trees	Peridiscus lucidus
Saxifragaceae (saxifrage family)	Saxifraga, from Latin for "stone-breaking"	40 genera, distributed widely in the Northern Hemisphere, the Andes and New Guinea	Herbaceous perennials, usually, often with rhizomes. Ornamental genera include Astilbe, Bergenia, Darmera, Heuchera, Mukdenia, Rodgersia, Saxifraga, Tellima and Tiarella.	Saxifraga granulata
Tetracarpaeaceae (delicate-laurel family)	Tetracarpaea, from Greek for "four-fruited"	1 genus, in Tasmania	Low bushes with erect branches	Tetracarpaea tasmannica

== See also ==
- List of plant family names with etymologies
