= Douglas E. Soltis =

American botanist (born 1953)

- Born: 28 October 1953 (age 72)
- Education: Indiana University
- Spouse: Pamela S. Soltis
- Awards: Darwin–Wallace Medal (2016)
- Scientific career
- Fields: Botany
- Workplaces: Florida Museum of Natural History; Department of Biology, University of Florida
- Author abbrev. (botany): Soltis

Douglas Soltis is an American botanist who is a Distinguished Professor in the Laboratory of Molecular Systematics & Evolutionary Genetics (Soltis lab), Florida Museum of Natural History, and Department of Biology at the University of Florida. His research interests are in plant evolution and phylogeny, an area in which he has published extensively together with his wife Pamela Soltis and together they were the joint awardees of the 2006 Asa Gray Award. They are the principal investigators in the Soltis laboratory, where they both hold the rank of Distinguished Professor and are contributing authors of the Angiosperm Phylogeny Group.

Soltis holds a Ph.D. from Indiana University (1980).

He is a member of the Editorial Board for PNAS.

== Selected publications ==
- p.s. Soltis, d.e. Soltis. 2004. The origin and diversification of angiosperms. Am. J. Botany 91: 1614-1626
- s. Kim, v.a. Albert, m-j. Yoo, j.s. Farris, p.s. Soltis, d.e. Soltis. 2004. Pre-angiosperm duplication of floral genes and regulatory tinkering at the base of angiosperms. Am. J. Botany 91: 2102-2118
- j.c. Pires, k.y. Lim, a. Kovarík, r. Matyásek, a. Boyd, a.r. Leitch, i.j. Leitch, m.d. Bennett, p.s. Soltis, d.e. Soltis. 2004. Molecular cytogenetic analysis of recently evolved Tragopogon (Asteraceae) allopolyploids reveal a karyotype that is additive of the diploid progenitors. Am. J. Botany 91: 1022-1035
- t.j. Davies, t.g. Barraclough, m.w. Chase, p.s. Soltis, d.e. Soltis, v. Savolainen. 2004. Darwin's abominable mystery: Insights from a supertree of the angiosperms. Proceedings of the National Academy of Sciences, USA 101: 1904-1909.
- l.p. Ronse DeCraene, p.s. Soltis, d.e. Soltis. 2003. Evolution of floral structures in basal angiosperms. International Journal of Plant Sciences 164: S329-S363.
- angiosperm phylogeny group II. 2003. An update of the Angiosperm Phylogeny Group classification for the orders and families of flowering plants: APG II. Bot. J. of the Linnean Soc. 141: 399-436
- p.s. Soltis, d.e. Soltis, v. Savolainen, p.r. Crane, t. Barraclough. 2002. Rate heterogeneity among lineages of land plants: integration of molecular and fossil data and evidence for molecular living fossils. Proc. of the National Academy of Sci. USA 99: 4430-4435
- pamela s. Soltis, douglas e. Soltis, m.w. Chase. 1999. Angiosperm phylogeny inferred from multiple genes: A research tool for comparative biology. Nature 402: 402-404
- douglas e. Soltis, pamela s. Soltis. 2006. Developmental genetics of the flower. Volume 44 of Advances in botanical research incorporating advances in plant pathology. Academic Press, 616 pp. ISBN 0120059444 en línea
- pamela s. Soltis, douglas e. Soltis, jeff J. Doyle. 1992. Molecular systematics of plants. Editor Springer, 434 pp. ISBN 0412022419 en línea
- d.e. Soltis, p.s. Soltis. 1990. Isozymes in plant biology. Springer, 268 pp. ISBN 0412365006 en línea

== Bibliography ==
- "Pamela Soltis, Ph.D." University of Florida Research Foundation Professors. University of Florida. 2006.
- "Laboratory of Molecular Systematics & Evolutionary Genetics: Doug Soltis". Florida Museum of Natural History. 9 October 2014.
- "Doug Soltis". UF Biology. University of Florida. 2016. Archived from the original on 25 September 2015.
