= Pamela S. Soltis =

American botanist

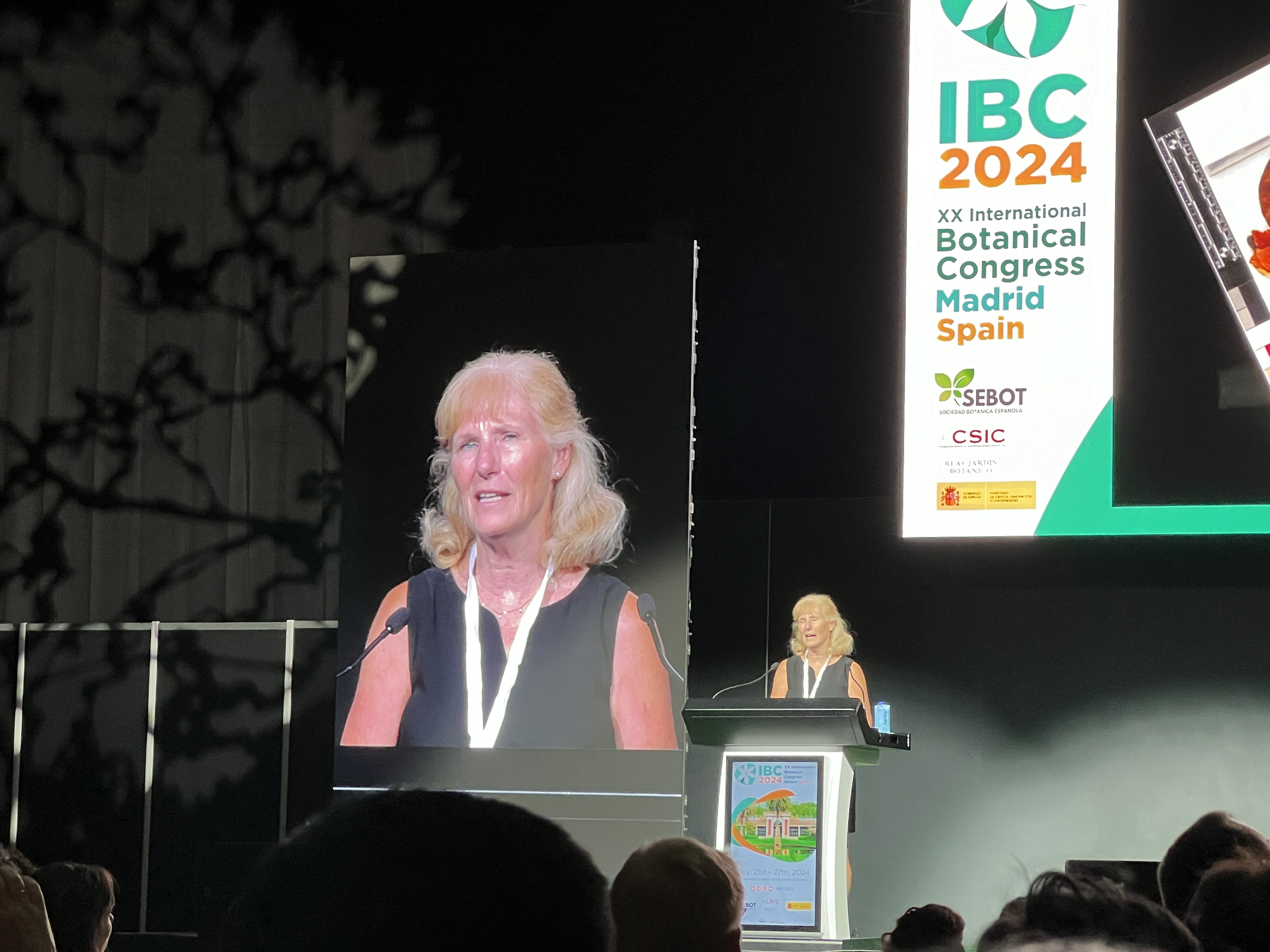
- Soltis presenting at XX International Botanical Congress (2024)
- Born: November 13, 1957 (age 69); Nelsonville, Ohio
- Other name: Pamela Sagraves
- Education: University of Kansas
- Spouse: Douglas E. Soltis
- Awards: Darwin–Wallace Medal (2016)
- Scientific career
- Fields: Botany
- Workplaces: Florida Museum of Natural History; University of Florida
- Author abbrev. (botany): P.S.Soltis

Pamela Soltis (born November 13, 1957) is an American botanist. She is a distinguished professor at the University of Florida, curator at the Florida Museum of Natural History, principal investigator of the Laboratory of Molecular Systematics and Evolutionary Genetics at the Florida Museum of Natural History, and founding director of the University of Florida Biodiversity Institute.

== Early life and education ==
Soltis was born on November 13, 1957, in Nelsonville, Ohio, to Barbara D. Sagraves and Walter Ronald Sagraves. She attended Pella High School in Pella, Iowa, and graduated in 1976 as valedictorian. She was a National Merit Finalist in 1976. She earned her bachelor's degree in biology from Central College in 1980 and graduated summa cum laude. She then attended University of Kansas and earned an M.Phil. with honors in botany in 1984 and a Ph.D. in botany in 1986. Her dissertation was chaired by William L. Bloom and included focus on Clarkia.

== Career ==
After earning her Ph.D., Soltis started as an assistant professor in the Department of Botany at Washington State University in 1986 and was promoted to associate professor in 1992. She was then promoted in full professor in the Department of Botany and School of Biological Sciences in 1998. In 2000, Soltis moved from Washington State University to University of Florida, Florida Museum of Natural History as curator. At the University of Florida, Soltis was University of Florida Research Foundation Research Professor from 2006 to 2009 and co-director of the UF Computational Biology Program from 2009 to 2012.

== Research ==
Soltis' research has focused on the patterns and processes that generated the tree of life. More specifically, she studies the flowering plant (angiosperm) diversity and evolution. She uses genomic methods, natural history collections and computational modeling to understand the phylogeny, phylogeography, and polyploidy of angiosperms. She has published over 400 scientific papers, and among her most cited contributions are papers on the role of genetic and genomic attributes in the success of polyploids. In 2016, Soltis was elected as a member of the National Academy of Sciences and the American Academy of Arts and Sciences in 2017.

== Service ==
Soltis was president of the Botanical Society of America 2007–08. She has served on the Councils of the Society for the Study of Evolution, the American Society of Plant Taxonomists, the American Genetics Association, and the Society of Systematic Biologists. She served a three-year term as secretary of the Botanical Society of America and is currently the president of the Society of Systematic Biologists. She also serves as an associate editor for the journals Evolution and Systematic Biology. She is a member of the University of Kansas Women's Hall of Fame.

== Honors ==
She was the winner of the 2002 Dahlgren Prize in Botany from the Royal Physiographic Society of Sweden. Reuters named her as a highly cited researcher in 2014.

She won, along with her husband, Douglas Soltis, the 2006 Asa Gray Award. She was elected to the National Academy of Sciences in 2016, and was elected a fellow of the American Association for the Advancement of Science in 2022.

== Selected publications ==
=== Scientific publications ===
- p.s. Soltis, d.e. Soltis. 2004. The origin and diversification of angiosperms. Am. J. Bot. 91: 1614–1626
- s. Kim, v.a. Albert, m-j. Yoo, j.s. Farris, p.s. Soltis, d.e. Soltis. 2004. Pre-angiosperm duplication of floral genes and regulatory tinkering at the base of angiosperms. Am. J. Bot. 91: 2102–2118
- j.c. Pires, k.y. Lim, a. Kovarík, r. Matyásek, a. Boyd, a.r. Leitch, i.j. Leitch, m.d. Bennett, p.s. Soltis, d.e. Soltis. 2004. Molecular cytogenetic analysis of recently evolved Tragopogon (Asteraceae) allopolyploids reveal a karyotype that is additive of the diploid progenitors. Am. J. Bot. 91: 1022–1035
- t.j. Davies, t.g. Barraclough, m.w. Chase, p.s. Soltis, d.e. Soltis, v. Savolainen. 2004. Darwin's abominable mystery: Insights from a supertree of the angiosperms. Proceedings of the National Academy of Sciences, USA 101: 1904–1909.
- l.p. Ronse DeCraene, p.s. Soltis, d.e. Soltis. 2003. Evolution of floral structures in basal angiosperms. International Journal of Plant Sciences 164: S329-S363.
- angiosperm phylogeny group II. 2003. An update of the Angiosperm Phylogeny Group classification for the orders and families of flowering plants: APG II. Bot. J. of the Linnean Soc. 141: 399-436
- p.s. Soltis, d.e. Soltis, v. Savolainen, p.r. Crane, t. Barraclough. 2002. Rate heterogeneity among lineages of land plants: integration of molecular and fossil data and evidence for molecular living fossils. Proc. of the National Academy of Sci. USA 99: 4430-4435
- m.a. Gitzendanner, p.s. Soltis. 2000. Patterns of genetic variation in rare and widespread plant congeners: Do rare species have low levels of genetic variability? Am. J. Bot. 87: 783-792
- pamela s. Soltis, douglas e. Soltis, m.w. Chase. 1999. Angiosperm phylogeny inferred from multiple genes: A research tool for comparative biology. Nature 402: 402-404

=== Books ===
- douglas e. Soltis, pamela s. Soltis. 2006. Developmental genetics of the flower. Volumen 44 de Advances in botanical research incorporating advances in plant pathology. Edición ilustrada de Academic Press, 616 pp. ISBN 0120059444 en línea
- pamela s. Soltis, douglas e. Soltis, jeff J. Doyle. 1992. Molecular systematics of plants. Editor Springer, 434 pp. ISBN 0412022419 en línea
- d.e. Soltis, p.s. Soltis. 1990. Isozymes in plant biology. Edición ilustrada de Springer, 268 pp. ISBN 0412365006 en línea
- pamela s. Soltis. 1986. Studies of genetic variation in an introgressive complex in Clarkia (Onagraceae). Editor University of Kansas, Botany, 596 pp.
