= Pterostemonaceae =

Pterostemonaceae (Engl.), Small is a family of shrubs native to subtropical Mexico. The family was described by scientists working with the Angiosperm Phylogeny Group. However, it is combined into the family Grossulariaceae (currants and gooseberries) by other taxonomic systems. The APG II system recognized the family as containing a single genus, Pterostemon. The APG III system of 2009, as well as later versions, do not recognize Pterostemomaceae, and thus place Pterostemon within the Iteaceae (sweetspires).

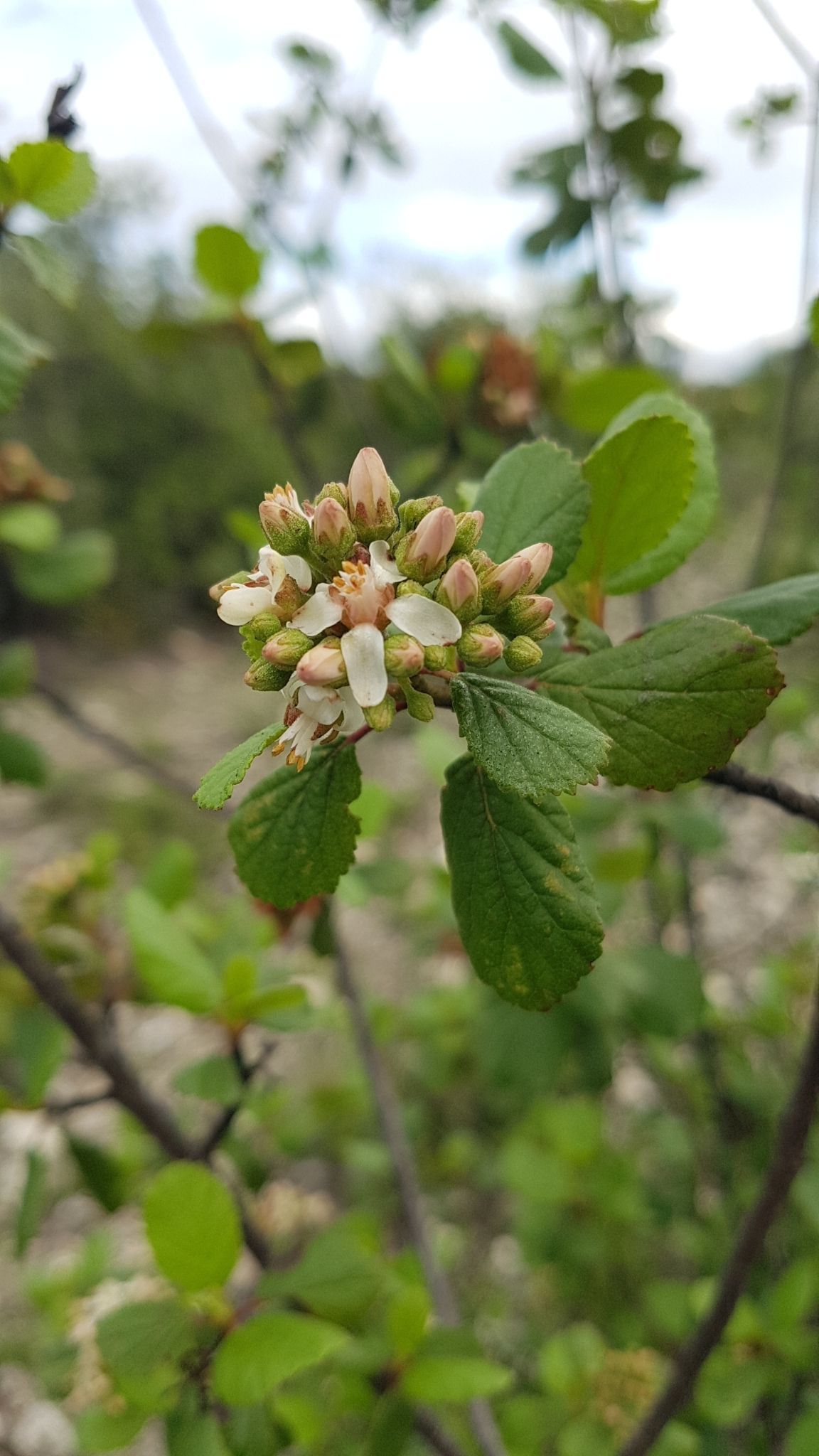
Pterostemon rotundifolius.
