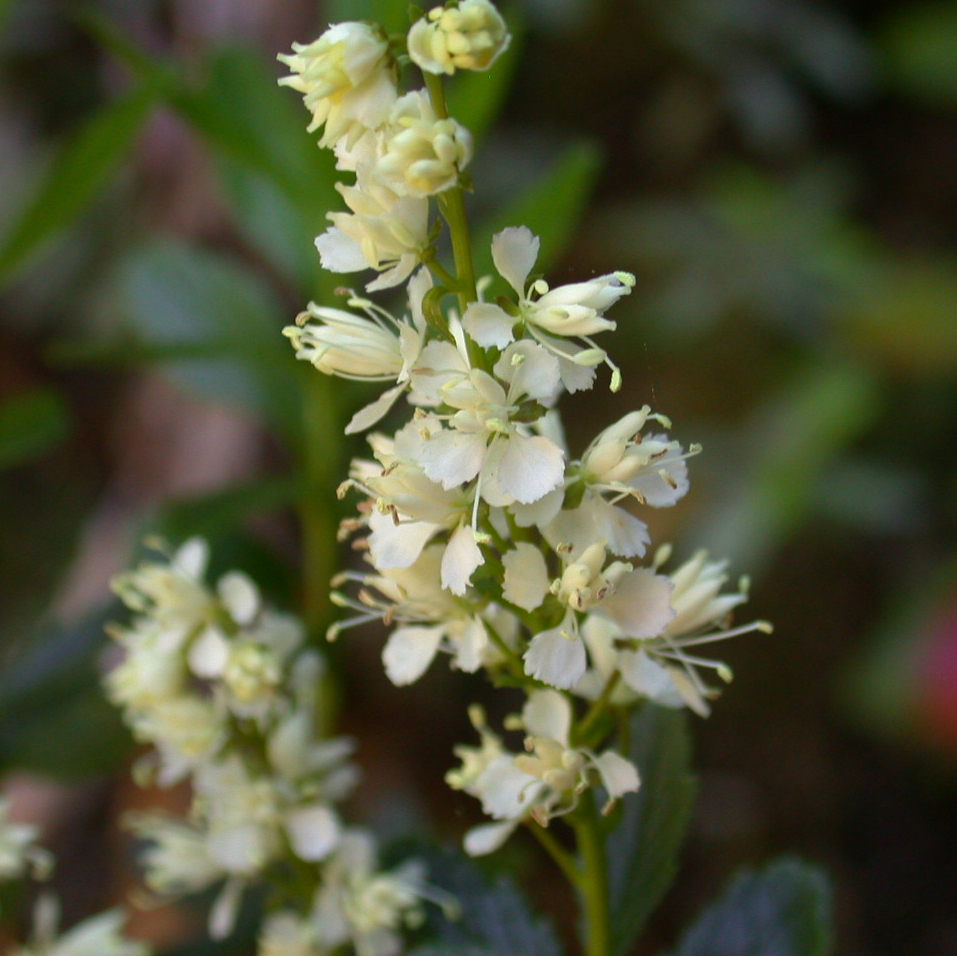

Scientific classification
- Kingdom: Plantae
- Clade: Tracheophytes
- Clade: Angiosperms
- Clade: Eudicots
- Order: Saxifragales
- Family: Tetracarpaeaceae; Nakai
- Genus: Tetracarpaea; Hook.
- Species: T. tasmannica

Binomial name
- Tetracarpaea tasmannica Hook.

= Tetracarpaea =

Genus of flowering plants

Tetracarpaea is the only genus in the flowering plant family Tetracarpaeaceae. Some taxonomists place it in the family Haloragaceae sensu lato, expanding that family from its traditional circumscription to include Penthorum and Tetracarpaea, and sometimes Aphanopetalum as well.

Tetracarpaea has one species, Tetracarpaea tasmannica, an evergreen, bushy shrub from subalpine areas of Tasmania. It is variable in height, from 1.5 to 10 dm. The leaves are shiny and small, with prominent veins, and the ends of the branches are crowded with small, white flowers. It is not known in cultivation, but has been grown from cuttings.

Tetracarpaea has an odd mix of characters, and during the nineteenth and twentieth centuries, its affinities remained obscure. It was variously classified by different authors, usually with considerable uncertainty. Molecular phylogenetic analysis of DNA sequences has shown that Tetracarpaea is a member of the Haloragaceae alliance, an informal group composed of the families Aphanopetalaceae, Tetracarpaeaceae, Penthoraceae, and Haloragaceae. These are four of the fourteen or fifteen families in the order Saxifragales.

== Description ==
The following description is based on information from several sources.

Tetracarpaea tasmannica is a glabrous, evergreen, erect and bushy shrub. It is variable in height, usually from 1.5 to 6 dm, but sometimes attaining a height of 1 m and a width of 7 dm.

The leaves are elliptic to oblanceolate, about 25 mm long and 8 mm wide, on a petiole about 2 mm long. The veins are prominent and end near the margin. The margins are serrate or crenate. On both surfaces, the epidermis is covered by a thick cuticle.

The inflorescences are dense, erect, terminal racemes, up to 5 cm long. The flowers appear in autumn. They are bisexual, actinomorphic, and 5 to 10 mm wide. The 4 sepals persist to the maturity of the fruit. The 4 petals are white and spatulate in shape.

The stamens are either 4 or 8 in number. If 4, they are opposite (along the same radii as) the sepals. The anthers are basifixed.

The ovary is superior and consists of 4 carpels that are large compared to the rest of the flower. The carpels are usually separate, but occasionally 2 or 3 of them are fused at the base, or rarely, as far as halfway up. They are erect and stipitate with a suture along the ventral side. A placenta runs along each side of the suture and bears 1 to 3 rows of numerous, tiny ovules. The ovules have been described as having one integument or two.

The ovary hardly enlarges after anthesis. The fruit consists of 4 follicles joined at the base. The seeds are numerous and about ½ mm long.

== Relationships ==
Named by William Jackson Hooker in 1840, the name Tetracarpaea refers to the four conspicuous and separate carpels. At that time, he wrote:

This beautiful little shrub is altogether new to me: but much as it differs in certain characters, both of the foliage and fructification, from the Order Cunoniaceae, I think it may safely be referred to it. The 4 carpels, which have suggested the Generic name, are perfectly free even in the earliest state of the ovary.

— William Jackson Hooker

Hooker did not use the modern system of suffixes for taxonomic ranks. He placed Tetracarpaea in what would later be known as the family Cunoniaceae. From that time, until the end of the twentieth century, most authors put it in either Cunoniaceae, Escalloniaceae, or Saxifragaceae. It was believed that these three families were related, but today, they are placed in separate orders.

It is now known that Cunoniaceae belongs in Oxalidales. Escalloniaceae is even more distant from Tetracarpaea, being a member of an asterid group called the campanulids. In the APG III system, it is assigned to the monofamilial order Escalloniales. Phylogenetic analysis of DNA has placed Tetracarpaea in the order Saxifragales, and in the "core Saxifragales", but no closer to Saxifragaceae. The family Saxifragaceae is now defined much more narrowly than it had been until 2001.

== History ==
After William Jackson Hooker named Tetracarpaea and placed it in Cunoniaceae, he was followed by George Bentham, who placed it in the same family. Bentham mistakenly attributed the name to "Hook.f." (Joseph Dalton Hooker), an error that is still repeated today. In 1865, George Bentham and Joseph Hooker moved Tetracarpaea from Cunoniaceae to Escalloniaceae.

Adolf Engler put Tetracarpaea in Saxifragaceae, but defined the latter so widely that it included what is now Escalloniaceae as a subfamily. Engler first placed Tetracarpaea in subfamily Escallonioideae, then later moved it to its own subfamily.

In 1943, Takenoshin Nakai put Tetracarpaea in a family to itself and was the first to use the term "Tetracarpaeaceae". John Hutchinson did not follow suit, but placed it in Escalloniaceae.

Arthur Cronquist put Tetracarpaea in Grossulariaceae. This family is now understood to contain only the genus Ribes and is sister to Saxifragaceae. Armen Takhtajan has at different times put Tetracarpaea in Escalloniaceae and in Tetracarpaeaceae. Most recently, in 2009, he put it in Tetracarpaeaceae.

In 1988, Matthew H. Hils, et alii, did a detailed study of the anatomy of the wood and leaves of Tetracarpaea. They concluded that Tetracarpaea was much closer to Saxifragaceae than to Cunoniaceae or Escalloniaceae.

The first molecular phylogenetic studies of the order Saxifragales were inconclusive because their results had only weak statistical support. In 2008, by comparing DNA sequences of the entire invert repeat region of the chloroplast genome, Shuguang Jian et alii were able to determine the position of Tetracarpaea within Saxifragales. These results had strong bootstrap support.
