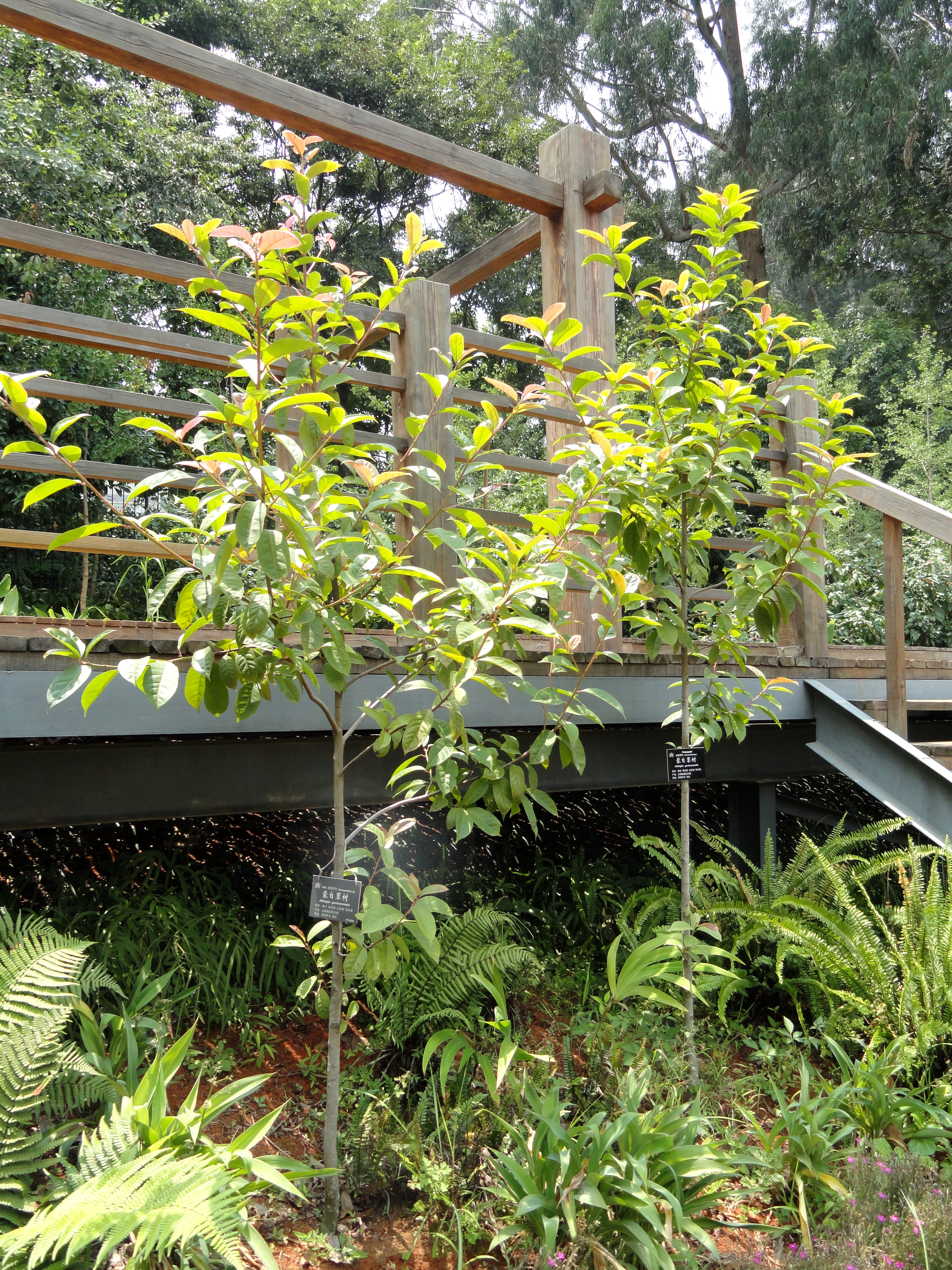
- Altingia yunnanensis in Kunming Botanical Garden

Scientific classification
- Kingdom: Plantae
- Clade: Embryophytes
- Clade: Tracheophytes
- Clade: Spermatophytes
- Clade: Angiosperms
- Clade: Eudicots
- Order: Saxifragales
- Family: Altingiaceae
- Genus: Liquidambar
- Species: L. yunnanensis

Binomial name
- Liquidambar yunnanensis Rehder & E.H. Wilson

Synonyms
- Altingia yunnanensis Rehder & E.H.Wilson

= Liquidambar yunnanensis =

Species of plant

Liquidambar yunnanensis is an evergreen tree species in the small family Altingiaceae within the order Saxifragales. It is native to Southwest China (Yunnan) and Vietnam.

== Description ==
=== Vegetative characteristics ===
The evergreen tree reaches a height of (3–)15–30 m. The young branches are sparsely pubescent and later become glabrous; older branches are gray-brown to gray, striped, and covered with lenticels. The bud scales are narrow-ovate. The phyllotaxis of the leaves is spiral, and they have a thick, (1–)1.5–2 cm long, glabrous petiole. The stipules are linear to filiform and 2–5 mm long. They are caducous, leaving small scars. The simple, undivided, pinnate leaf blade is elongated-ovate or elongated-elliptical, 6–15 cm long and 3–7 cm wide. It usually has a wedge-shaped, sometimes almost rounded base, and a pointed to acuminate apex. The blade is leathery, pale-colored on the underside, and glabrous. It has 6–9 pairs of both adaxial and abaxial lateral veins. The leaf margin is serrate to dentate almost to the base.

=== Reproductive characteristics ===
The sexual distribution of the flowers is monoecious. The flowers lack a perianth.

Male inflorescences are multi-flowered, ellipsoidal, approximately 1 cm long head. They are pedicellate and arranged in clusters at the ends of the branches or just below them. The male flowers consist only of separate stamens with sessile, basifixed anthers. The two truncate thecae each consist of two pollen sacs and open longitudinally by a slit.

The head-like female inflorescences are usually arranged in racemes. They have a 3–4(–6) cm long, pubescent peduncle, surrounded at the base by four ovate, about 15 mm long bracts, and consist of 16–24 flowers. These contain only the half-inferior ovary, which consists of two fused, free only at the tip carpels, an enclosing disk, and several scale-like staminodia. The two filiform, 3–4 mm long styles are brown and pubescent. Each of the two locules contains numerous ovules on the central placentation.

The 3–6.5 cm long pedicellate fruits are 1.5–3 cm wide and nearly spherical with a truncate base. The individual fruits are woody, dehiscent, and slightly brownish-pubescent capsules, which open loculicidally with two valves. The upper part of the style and the staminodia are no longer present in the fruiting state. The seeds are angular.

Liquidambar yunnanensis flowers from March to May and fruits from May to July.

=== Chromosomes ===
Liquidambar yunnanensis has a diploid chromosome number of 2n = 32.

== Distribution and habitat ==
Liquidambar yunnanensis is presented as an endemic species in Southeast Yunnan Province, China, in the Flora of China. However, other sources also report occurrences in Vietnam, both near the Chinese border in the provinces of Lào Cai and Cao Bằng, as well as in the south of the country near Nha Trang.

The tree species grows in mountain forests.

== Taxonomy and systematics ==
The species was first described in 1913 by Alfred Rehder and Ernest Henry Wilson based on two collections made by Irish plant collector Augustine Henry. As the publication was actually dedicated to the collections of E.H. Wilson, and in this case the underlying collections were from another collector, the description appeared only as a footnote to Liquidambar formosana var. monticola.

== Etymology ==
The specific epithet yunnanensis refers to the type locality of the species in Yunnan Province, China. The genus Altingia is named in honor of Willem Arnold Alting (1724–1800), the Governor-General of Dutch East Indies during the time when the first describer Francisco Noroña visited Java.
