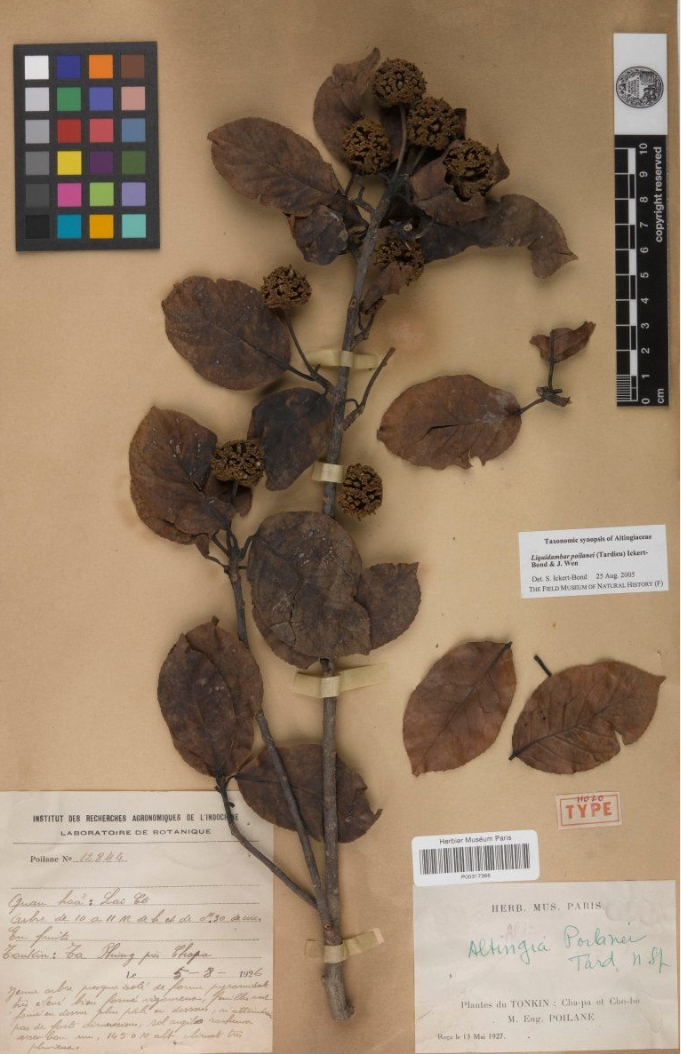

Conservation status
- Data Deficient (IUCN 3.1)

Scientific classification
- Kingdom: Plantae
- Clade: Embryophytes
- Clade: Tracheophytes
- Clade: Spermatophytes
- Clade: Angiosperms
- Clade: Eudicots
- Order: Saxifragales
- Family: Altingiaceae
- Genus: Liquidambar
- Species: L. poilanei

Binomial name
- Liquidambar poilanei (Tardieu) Ickert-Bond & J.Wen

Synonyms
- Altingia poilanei Tardieu

= Liquidambar poilanei =

Species of flowering plant

Liquidambar poilanei is a species of flowering plant in the family Altingiaceae. It is a shrub or tree with dark green, parchment-like leaves, and round seed capsules. The species is native to northern Vietnam.

Liquidambar poilanei was described in 1965, and received its current name in 2013. Only two herbarium specimens are known to exist. The IUCN lists the species as Data Deficient.

== Taxonomy ==
Liquidambar poilanei was first described as Altingia poilanei, in 1965, by Marie Laure Tardieu. In 2013, Stefanie Ickert-Bond and Jun Wen moved all species of the genus Altingia to Liquidambar, creating the new combination Liquidambar poilanei.

The type specimens were collected from a forest by a small river, in Sa Pa, Lào Cai province, Vietnam. Only two confirmed specimens are known to exist. A third identified specimen may be a variation of Liquidambar chinensis.

== Distribution ==
Liquidambar poilanei is native to the wet tropical biome of Vietnam. It is endemic to northern Vietnam.

Liquidambar poilanei grows in moist, well-drained sand or loam. The species can grow in acidic or pH neutral environments, and in either full sun or partial shade. It is hardy in coastal and relatively mild climates.

== Description ==
Liquidambar poilanei is a small tree or large shrub. It grows 2.5–4 metres (8.2–13.1 ft) high, and takes five to ten years to reach its ultimate height. The leaves are dark green, parchment-like, broadly elliptical, and finely serrated. The seed capsules are large, round, and pitted.

The species can be propagated by seeds or semi-ripe cuttings. It may be vulnerable to honey fungus.

== Conservation ==
In 2018, the IUCN listed Liquidambar poilanei as Data Deficient. It is known only from Vietnam's Lào Cai province, and the population is thought to be small.
