= Liquidambar cambodiana =

Conservation status
- Data Deficient (IUCN 3.1)

Scientific classification
- Kingdom: Plantae
- Clade: Embryophytes
- Clade: Tracheophytes
- Clade: Spermatophytes
- Clade: Angiosperms
- Clade: Eudicots
- Order: Saxifragales
- Family: Altingiaceae
- Genus: Liquidambar
- Species: L. cambodiana

Binomial name
- Liquidambar cambodiana (Lecomte) Ickert-Bond & J.Wen

Synonyms
- Altingia cambodiana Lecomte

Species of tree endemic to Cambodia

Liquidambar cambodiana, commonly known as sdey, is a tree in the Altingiaceae family endemic to southwest Cambodia.

== Taxonomy ==
The species was originally named Altingia cambodiana in 1924 by the French botanist Paul Henri Lecomte (1856–1934). In 2013, US botanists Stefanie M. Ickert-Bond and Jun Wen (born 1963) demonstrated that it was in the Altingiaceae family and Liquidambar genus.

== Description ==
The taxa grows as a tree from 8 to 10 m (26 to 33 ft) tall. The species is differentiated from other Liquidambar by having leaves that are glossy on the upper surface and with margins that are distinctly revolute when dry.

== Distribution ==
The tree is reported from three locations in the Dâmrei Mountains of southwestern Cambodia. It was reported in the riparian forests in basalt areas (and perhaps more widely) of the Chuor Phnom Krâvanh/Cardamon Mountains of western Cambodia, the tree dominates the riverbanks. However the botanist Ickert-Bond visited Bokor National Park around 2013, and for several days attempted to find specimens with no luck, and identified stands near the Pokovil waterfall in the Dâmrei Mountains as being a population of Liquidambar siamensis It grows from lowlands areas up to 500 m (1,600 ft) in altitude.

== Conservation ==
This plant has not been found in the last few decades. Therefore, its conservation status has been described as Data Deficient. As it is only known from three archived specimens from one location, it is believed that this taxa has a small population size, in an area with expanding tourism impacts and resource extraction.

== Vernacular names ==
- sdey (Khmer language)

== Uses ==
The young leaves of the tree are eaten raw in salads; they are an appreciated food and are particularly eaten in the dish tük kröeung. The wood is used to make tool handles.
