= Liquidambar multinervis =

Conservation status
- Data Deficient (IUCN 3.1)

Scientific classification
- Kingdom: Plantae
- Clade: Embryophytes
- Clade: Tracheophytes
- Clade: Spermatophytes
- Clade: Angiosperms
- Clade: Eudicots
- Order: Saxifragales
- Family: Altingiaceae
- Genus: Liquidambar
- Species: L. multinervis

Binomial name
- Liquidambar multinervis (W.C.Cheng) Ickert-Bond & J.Wen

Synonyms
- Altingia multinervis W.C.Cheng

Species of flowering plant

Liquidambar multinervis is a species of flowering plant in the family Altingiaceae. It is a tree up to 10 metres (33 ft) high. It is native to Guizhou, China.

Liquidambar multinervis was first described in 1947, and received its current name in 2013. The IUCN lists it as Data Deficient.

== Taxonomy ==
Liquidambar multinervis was first described in 1947, by Wan-Chun Cheng, and placed in the genus Altingia. In 2013, all species of Altingia were moved to Liquidambar, creating the new combination Liquidambar multinervis.

The species is known only from the type specimen, which includes a branch, leaves, and a crushed infructescence.

== Distribution ==
Liquidambar multinervis is native to the temperate biome of northern Guizhou, China. It has only been found in Guizhou. It grows at an elevation of 1,000 metres (3,300 ft), and has been reported from forests.

== Description ==
Liquidambar multinervis is a tree up to 10 metres (33 ft) high. It has papery leaves with serrate margins and ten lateral veins. The leaves have long stems.

Liquidambar multinervis appears similar to L. siamensis and L. excelsa.

== Conservation ==
The IUCN lists Liquidambar multinervis as Data Deficient. The population size is assumed to be small, and its trend is unknown. In China, the species is assessed as Endangered.
