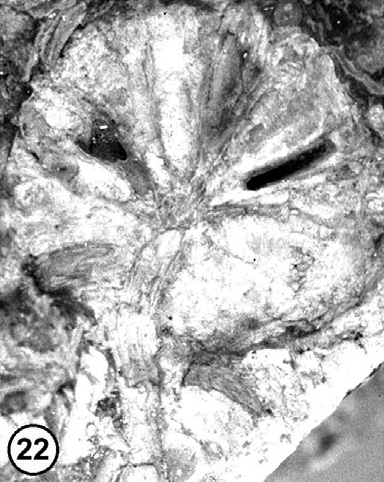
- Liquidambar changii infructescence

Scientific classification
- Kingdom: Plantae
- Clade: Tracheophytes
- Clade: Angiosperms
- Clade: Eudicots
- Order: Saxifragales
- Family: Altingiaceae
- Genus: Liquidambar
- Species: †L. changii

Binomial name
- †Liquidambar changii Pigg, Ickert-Bond & Wen

= Liquidambar changii =

Liquidambar changii Temporal range: Middle Miocene

Extinct species of flowering plant

Liquidambar changii is an extinct species of sweetgum in the Altingiaceae genus Liquidambar. Liquidambar changii is known from Middle Miocene fossils found in Central Washington.

== History and classification ==
The species was first described from specimens of silicified infructescences in blocks of chert. The chert was recovered from the "Hi hole" site, one of the "county line hole" fossil localities north of Interstate 82 in Yakima County, Washington. The "Hi hole" site works strata which was thought to be part of the Museum Flow Package within the interbeds of the Sentinel Bluffs Unit of the central Columbia Plateau N_{2} Grande Ronde Basalt, Columbia River Basalt Group. The Museum Flow Package interbeds, designated the type locality, are dated to the middle Miocene and are approximately 15.6 million years old. Later re-evaluation of the "hi hole" site indicated that the site is included into a basalt flow, rather than part of the interbedded Museum flow package. The evaluation suggested the basalt is part of the Wanapum Basalt and that the fossils are possibly a little younger than formerly reported. Dating reported in 2007 of a related site near Ellensburg, Washington confirmed that the deposits worked are pockets within the basalt flows, and the 15.6 million year old date was accurate.

At the time of study, the holotype infructescence, specimen UWBM 94723, and a series of paratype specimens are preserved in chert blocks housed in the Burke Museum of Natural History and Culture while an additional seven of the paratypes were part of the paleobotanical collections at Arizona State University. The specimens represent a range of preservation conditions, ranging from exposed on weathered surfaces of the chert, totally weathered out of the chert, and as hollow chert casts of the infructescences. A total of 42 specimens in chert were studied by paleobotanists Kathleen Pigg, Stefanie Ickert-Bond, and Jun Wen, with their 2004 type description being published in the American Journal of Botany. Pigg and team chose the specific epithet changii as a patronym honoring the Chinese botanist and ecologist Hung-ta Chang, for his work with the family Altingiaceae and for describing the living species Liquidambar acalycina.

Based on the infructescence morphology, Pigg et al noted the close similarity between L. changii and L. acalycina, suggesting they are possibly closely related. Due to the lack of some details used for the delimitation of L. acalycina, they chose to place the fossils into a new species rather than describe them as fossils belonging to the living species. The authors also noted that a number of Liquidambar compression/impression fossils of very similar age have been reported from the region, and may be also closely related, but lack the needed detail for examination.

== Description ==
Liquidambar changii infructescences are round in shape, with diameters reaching 2.5 cm (0.98 in), consisting of as many as 30 individual capsules in a helical arrangement. The infructescences are born on woody stems of up to 16 mm (0.63 in) and several specimens have stems containing secondary xylem. The woody structuring of the stems occasionally extends into the infructescence and all of the specimens have ducts for resin or gum, a character seen in living Liquidambar. The individual capsules are bi-locular with elongated outlines that are open at the top, and closed at the base which attaches to the central axis of the fruit. In each capsule there are between 5 and 9 aborted seeds and between one and two mature seeds, attached to the interior of the capsule along the side that is fused to the adjoining capsule. The mature seeds are attached to the capsule near the fruit interior while the aborted seeds are found both near the interior and to the sides of the ventral margin. The mature fruits have a triangular outline and have a raised ridge that runs around the outside of the seed.
