= Liquidambar obovata =

Conservation status
- Vulnerable (IUCN 3.1)

Scientific classification
- Kingdom: Plantae
- Clade: Embryophytes
- Clade: Tracheophytes
- Clade: Spermatophytes
- Clade: Angiosperms
- Clade: Eudicots
- Order: Saxifragales
- Family: Altingiaceae
- Genus: Liquidambar
- Species: L. obovata

Binomial name
- Liquidambar obovata (Merr. & Chun) Ickert-Bond & J.Wen

Synonyms
- Altingia obovata Merr. & Chun

Species of flowering plant

Liquidambar obovata is a species of flowering plant in the family Altingiaceae. It is a tree native to Hainan, China.

The species was described in 1935, and received its current name in 2013. The IUCN has assessed it as Vulnerable.

== Taxonomy ==
Liquidambar obovata was described by Elmer Drew Merrill and Woon Young Chun in 1935. Merrill and Chun placed the species in the genus Altingia. In 2013, Stefanie Ickert-Bond and Jun Wen moved all the species of Altingia to Liquidambar, creating the new combination Liquidambar obovata.

== Distribution ==
Liquidambar obovata is native to the wet tropical biome of Hainan, China. It is endemic to Hainan. The species' extent of occurrence is estimated to be less than 2,000 square kilometres (770 sq mi).

The species grows in montane evergreen forests, at elevations of 800–1,400 metres (2,600–4,600 ft). It is likely to occur in less than ten locations.

== Description ==
Liquidambar obovata is a tree that can grow up to 30 metres (98 ft) high.

== Conservation ==
In 2018, the IUCN assessed Liquidambar obovata as Vulnerable. The population is assumed to be very small. The species is threatened by the conversion of evergreen forests into plantations.
