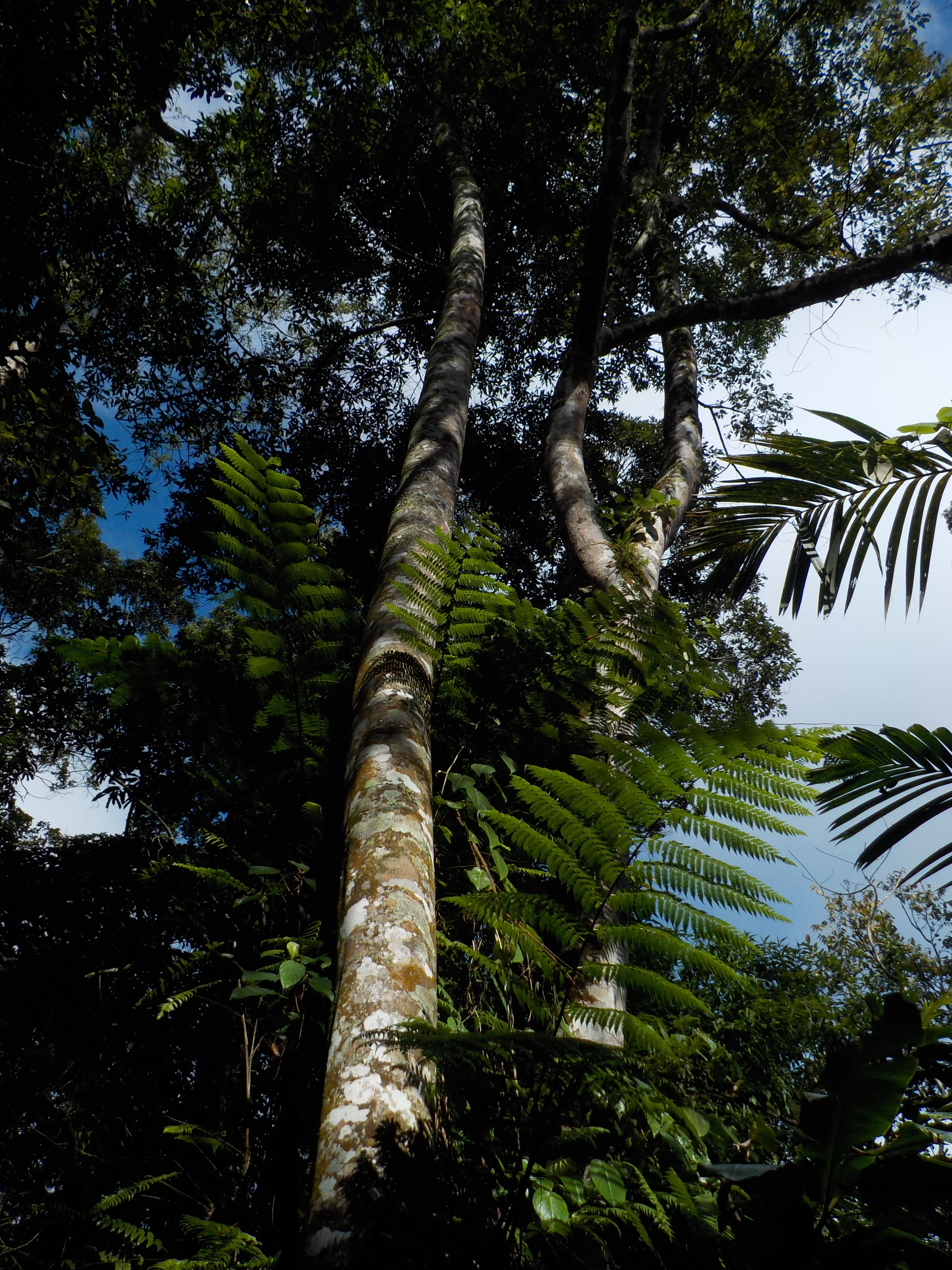
- Bole can be branchless to 35 m (115 ft)
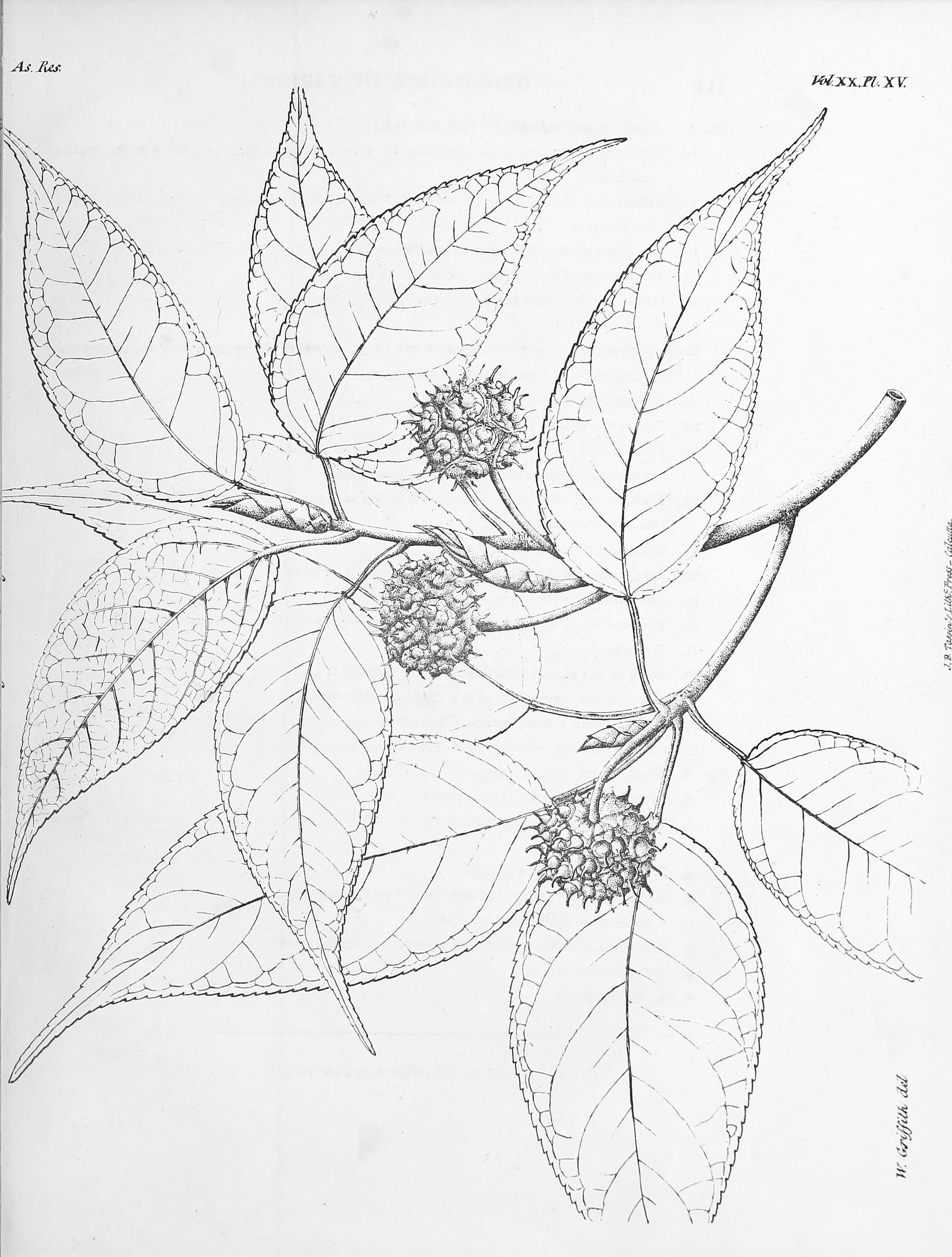
- Botanical illustration

Conservation status
- Least Concern (IUCN 3.1)

Scientific classification
- Kingdom: Plantae
- Clade: Tracheophytes
- Clade: Angiosperms
- Clade: Eudicots
- Order: Saxifragales
- Family: Altingiaceae
- Genus: Liquidambar
- Species: L. excelsa

Binomial name
- Liquidambar excelsa (Noronha) Oken

Synonyms
- List: Altingia caerulea Poir.; Altingia excelsa Noronha; Liquidambar altingia Blume; Liquidambar altingiana Blume; Liquidambar cerasifolia (Wall. & Griff.) Voigt; Liquidambar rasamala Blume; Sedgwickia cerasifolia Wall. & Griff.

= Liquidambar excelsa =

Species of plant

Liquidambar excelsa, the rasamala, is a species of flowering plant in the family Altingiaceae. Along with Liquidambar gracilipes, this species is a native source of storax in Indonesia.

== Distribution and habitat ==
It is native to Tibet and Yunnan in China, Bhutan, India (Assam), Bangladesh, and Southeast Asia, including western Malesia. A tree reaching 60 m (200 ft), it is typically found in wet tropical forests at elevations from 550 to 1,700 m (1,800 to 5,600 ft).

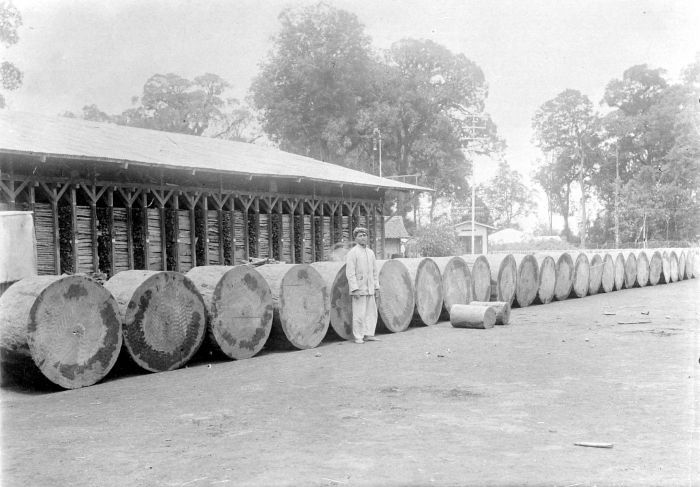
Diameter at breast height can reach 185 cm (73 in)
