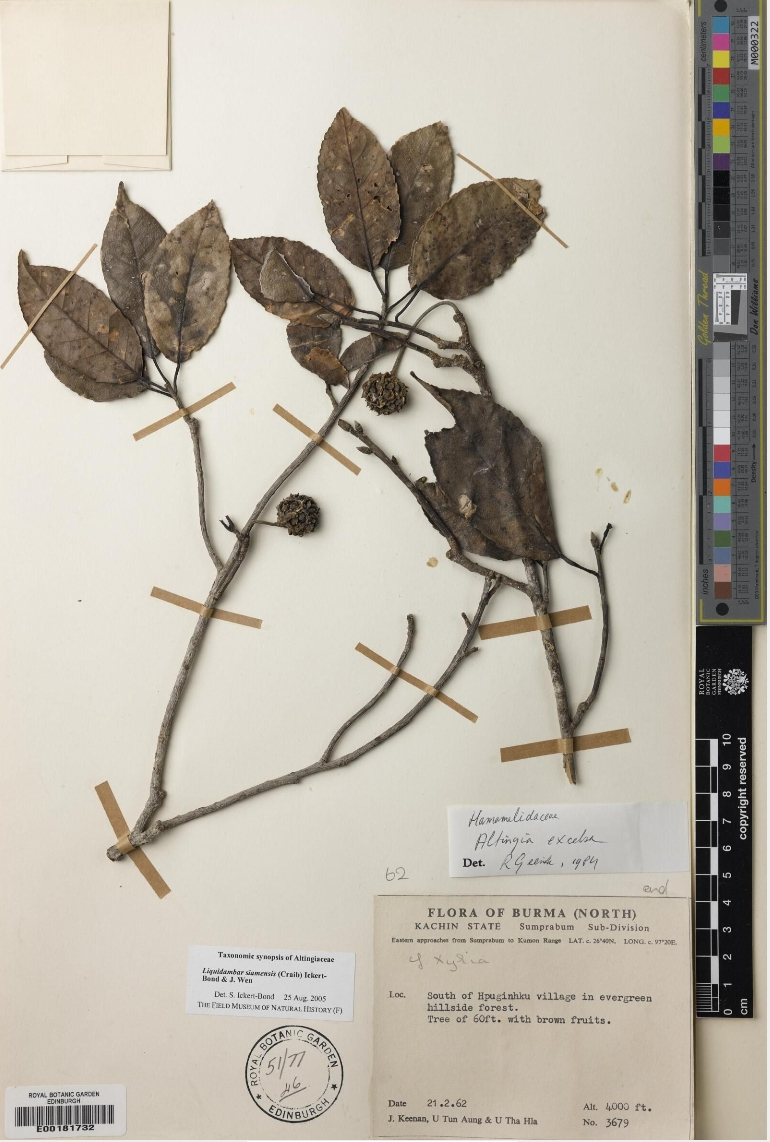

Conservation status
- Least Concern (IUCN 3.1)

Scientific classification
- Kingdom: Plantae
- Clade: Embryophytes
- Clade: Tracheophytes
- Clade: Spermatophytes
- Clade: Angiosperms
- Clade: Eudicots
- Order: Saxifragales
- Family: Altingiaceae
- Genus: Liquidambar
- Species: L. siamensis

Binomial name
- Liquidambar siamensis (Craib) Ickert-Bond & J.Wen

Synonyms
- Altingia siamensis Craib; Altingia angustifolia H.T.Chang; Altingia takhtajanii T.V.Trung & L.V.Lok; Altingia tenuifolia Chun ex Hung T.Chang

= Liquidambar siamensis =

Species of flowering plant

Liquidambar siamensis is a species of flowering plant in the family Altingiaceae. It is a tree native to south-east Asia.

Liquidambar siamensis was first described in 1928, and received its current name in 2013. The IUCN lists the species as of Least Concern. It is used for timber and essential oils.

== Taxonomy ==
The species was first described in 1928, by William Grant Craib, as Altingia siamensis. In 2013, Stefanie Ickert-Bond and Jun Wen moved all species of the genus Altingia to Liquidambar, creating the new combination Liquidambar siamensis.

== Distribution ==
Liquidambar siamensis is native to Cambodia, China (southern Yunnan, eastern Guangdong, Guizhou, and southern Jiangxi), Laos, Myanmar, Thailand, and Vietnam. It occurs in humid forests, and near rivers, at elevations of 350–1,200 metres (1,150–3,940 ft). It is a light demanding species.

== Description ==
Liquidambar siamensis is a tree that grows 7–30 metres (23–98 ft) high. It has simple leaves, with serrated edges, that lack drip tips. The leaves resemble those of Liquidambar multinervis. The infructescences are flattened, and shaped like inverted cones.

== Uses ==
Timber from Liquidambar siamensis is used in construction and ship-building. The species is also used for essential oils.

== Conservation ==
In 2018, the IUCN listed Liquidambar siamensis as of Least Concern. It is widespread in south-east Asia, faces no known threats, and occurs in protected areas. In China, the species is listed as Vulnerable, as it has a restricted geographic range.
