= Liquidambar chingii =

Conservation status
- Least Concern (IUCN 3.1)

Scientific classification
- Kingdom: Plantae
- Clade: Embryophytes
- Clade: Tracheophytes
- Clade: Spermatophytes
- Clade: Angiosperms
- Clade: Eudicots
- Order: Saxifragales
- Family: Altingiaceae
- Genus: Liquidambar
- Species: L. chingii

Binomial name
- Liquidambar chingii (F.P.Metcalf) Ickert-Bond & J.Wen

Synonyms
- Altingia chingii F.P.Metcalf; Semiliquidambar cathayensis H.T.Chang; Semiliquidambar chingii (F.P.Metcalf) H.T.Chang; Semiliquidambar chingii var. longipes Y.K.Li & X.M.Wang; Semiliquidambar coriacea H.T.Chang

Species of plant

Liquidambar chingii is a species of plant in the Altingiaceae family. It is native to Vietnam and China. It is threatened by habitat loss.
