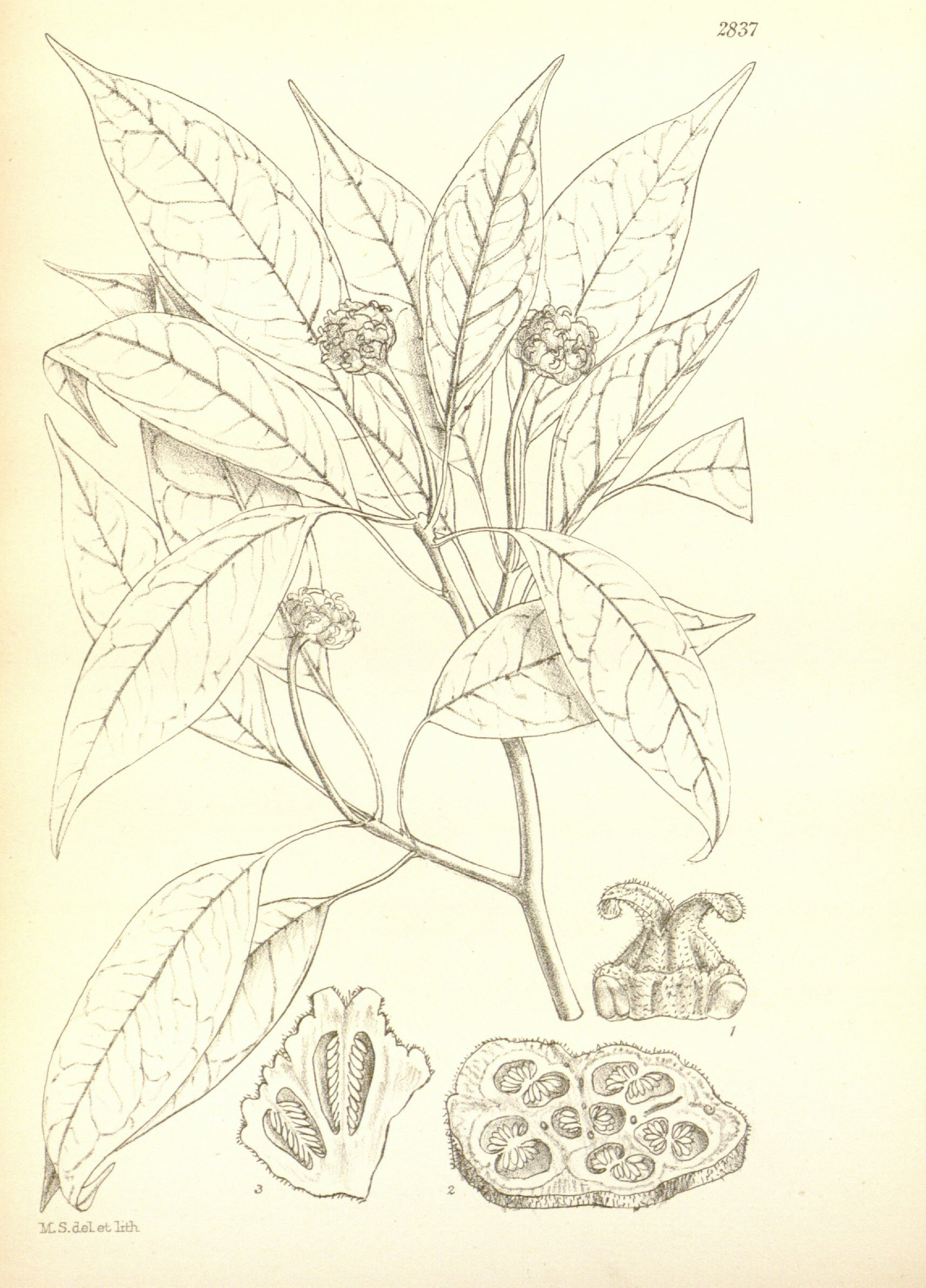
- Illustration

Conservation status
- Least Concern (IUCN 3.1)

Scientific classification
- Kingdom: Plantae
- Clade: Embryophytes
- Clade: Tracheophytes
- Clade: Spermatophytes
- Clade: Angiosperms
- Clade: Eudicots
- Order: Saxifragales
- Family: Altingiaceae
- Genus: Liquidambar
- Species: L. gracilipes

Binomial name
- Liquidambar gracilipes (Hemsl.) Ickert-Bond & J.Wen

Synonyms
- Altingia gracilipes Hemsl.; Altingia gracilipes var. serrulata Tutcher; Altingia gracilipes f. uniflora Hung T.Chang

= Liquidambar gracilipes =

Species of flowering plant

Liquidambar gracilipes is a species of flowering plant in the family Altingiaceae. It is native to China. The species was first described in 1907, and was moved to the genus Liquidambar in 2013.

Liquidambar gracilipes is a 12–20 metres (39–66 ft) tall tree. It is used as an ornamental plant, and its resin is used in medicine and perfume. The IUCN classifies the species as of Least Concern.

== Taxonomy ==
The species was first described in 1907, as Altingia gracilipes, by William Botting Hemsley. In 2013, all species of the genus Altingia were moved to Liquidambar, creating the new combination Liquidambar gracilipes.

== Distribution ==
Liquidambar gracilipes is native to the wet tropical biome of south-east China. It is present in Fujian, Guangdong, and Zhejiang, as well as Hong Kong. The species grows in evergreen forests.

The species is widespread, and its extent of occurrence is at least 110,000 square kilometres (42,000 sq mi). It grows at elevations of 400–1,000 metres (1,300–3,300 ft).

== Description ==
Liquidambar gracilipes grows 12–20 metres (39–66 ft) high. The leaves are simple, leathery, and have smooth edges. The ends of the leaves have a drip tip. The fruits are flattened.

Liquidambar gracilipes is similar to Liquidambar caudata, though the base of the leaves is strongly three-nerved in the former.

== Uses ==
The resin of Liquidambar gracilipes is used in medicine and perfume. In China, it is used as an ornamental plant.

== Conservation ==
In 2018, the IUCN classified Liquidambar gracilipes as of Least Concern.
