= Liquidambar caudata =

Conservation status
- Data Deficient (IUCN 3.1)

Scientific classification
- Kingdom: Plantae
- Clade: Embryophytes
- Clade: Tracheophytes
- Clade: Spermatophytes
- Clade: Angiosperms
- Clade: Eudicots
- Order: Saxifragales
- Family: Altingiaceae
- Genus: Liquidambar
- Species: L. caudata

Binomial name
- Liquidambar caudata (H. T. Chang) Ickert-Bond & J. Wen

Synonyms
- Semiliquidambar caudata H. T. Chang; Semiliquidambar caudata var. cuspidata (H. T. Chang) H. T. Chang; Semiliquidambar cuspidata H. T. Chang

Species of plant

Liquidambar caudata is a species of sweetgum tree endemic to East China.

== Description ==
Liquidambar caudata is similar to Liquidambar gracilipes, but its leaves are not strongly 3-nerved at the base. It can grow up to 10 meters tall.

== Distribution and habitat ==
Liquidambar caudata is native to the coastal Chinese provinces of Fujian and Zhejiang and lives primarily in subtropical forest habitats.
