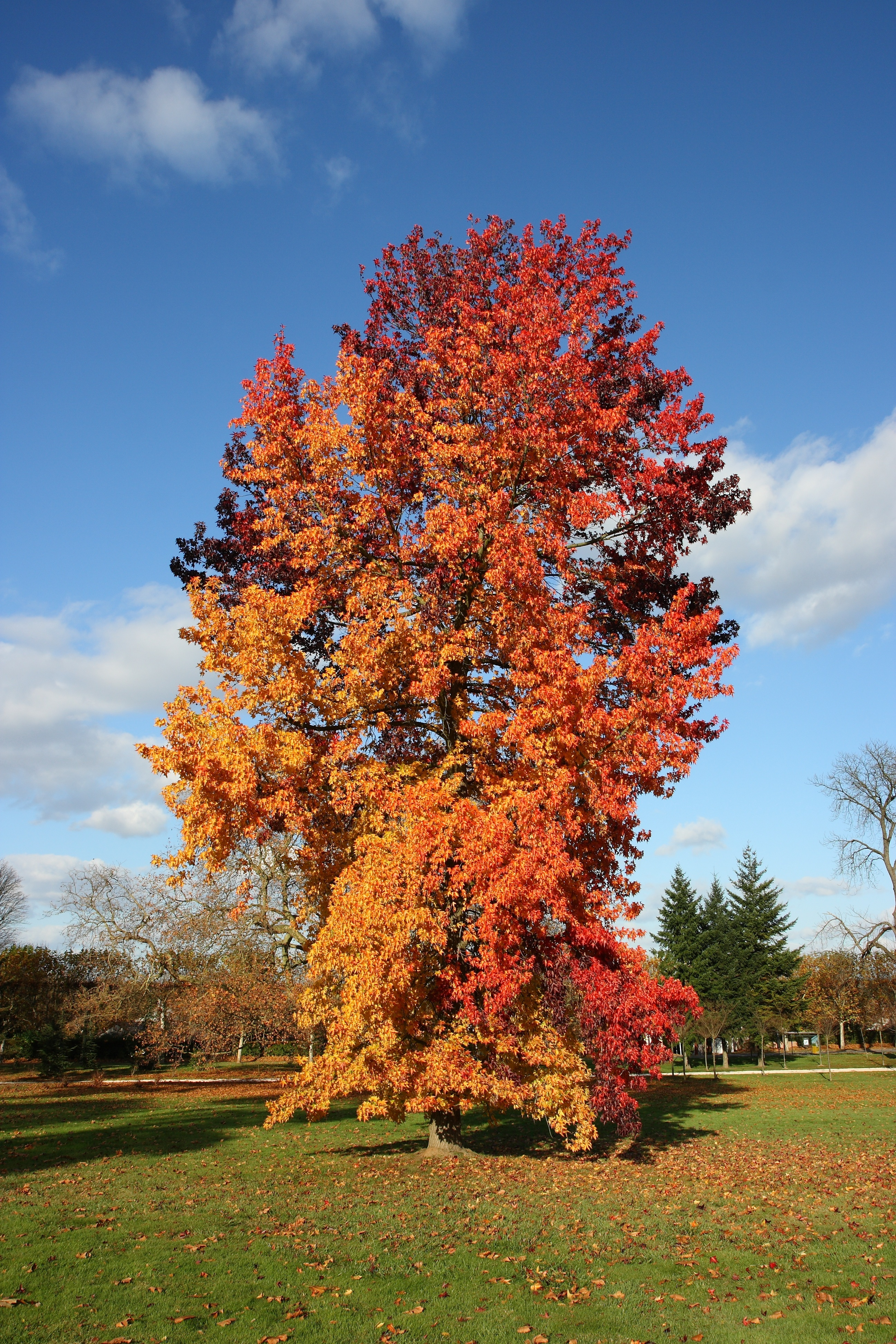
- Sweetgum (Liquidambar styraciflua)

Scientific classification
- Kingdom: Plantae
- Clade: Tracheophytes
- Clade: Angiosperms
- Clade: Eudicots
- Order: Saxifragales
- Family: Altingiaceae
- Genus: Liquidambar; L.

Type species
- Liquidambar styraciflua L.

Synonyms
- Altingia Noronha; Cathayambar (Harms) Nakai; Sedgwickia Griff.; Semiliquidambar H.T.Chang

= Liquidambar =

Liquidambar Temporal range: Late Cretaceous – Recent

Genus of flowering plants

Liquidambar, commonly called sweetgum (star gum in the UK), gum, redgum, satin-walnut, styrax or American storax, is the only extant genus in the flowering plant family Altingiaceae and has 15 species. They were formerly often treated as a part of the Hamamelidaceae. They are native to southeast and east Asia, the eastern Mediterranean and North America. They are decorative deciduous trees that are used in the wood industry and for ornamental purposes.

== Etymology ==
The scientific name of the genus is a combination of the Latin liquidus and the Arabic "amber". It refers to fragrant liquid, or balsam. Both the scientific and common names refer to the sweet resinous sap (liquid amber) exuded by the trunk when cut.

The synonym Altingia is in honor of Willem Arnold Alting (1724–1800), the Governor-General of Dutch East Indies during the time when the first describer Francisco Noroña visited Java.

== Species ==
=== Extant species ===
Image	Scientific name	Common name	Distribution
	Liquidambar acalycina	Chang's sweet gum	central & southern China
	Liquidambar cambodiana	Sdey	Cambodia
	Liquidambar caudata		Fujian and Zhejiang, China
	Liquidambar chinensis		south China to Vietnam
	Liquidambar chingii		south China to Vietnam
	Liquidambar excelsa	Rasamala	Indonesia to Tibet. Some populations in India and Bangladesh
	Liquidambar formosana	Chinese sweet gum	Vietnam, Laos, China, Taiwan and Korea
	Liquidambar gracilipes		southeast China
	Liquidambar multinervis		north Guizhou, China
Preserved specimen of Liquidambar obovata, consisting of a twig with brown leaves	Liquidambar obovata		Hainan, China
	Liquidambar orientalis	Oriental sweetgum	southwest Turkey and Rhodes, Greece
Preserved specimen of Liquidambar poilanei, consisting of a branch with dark brown leaves, and round fruits	Liquidambar poilanei		Vietnam
Preserved specimen of Liquidambar siamensis, consisting of twigs with brown leaves, and round fruits	Liquidambar siamensis		Southeast Asia to China
	Liquidambar styraciflua	American sweetgum	eastern North America from Connecticut, US, to Nicaragua
	Liquidambar yunnanensis		southeast Yunnan, China to Vietnam

=== Fossils ===
- †Liquidambar changii – Miocene (Washington state, North America)

== Description ==
Stereo image
Left frame
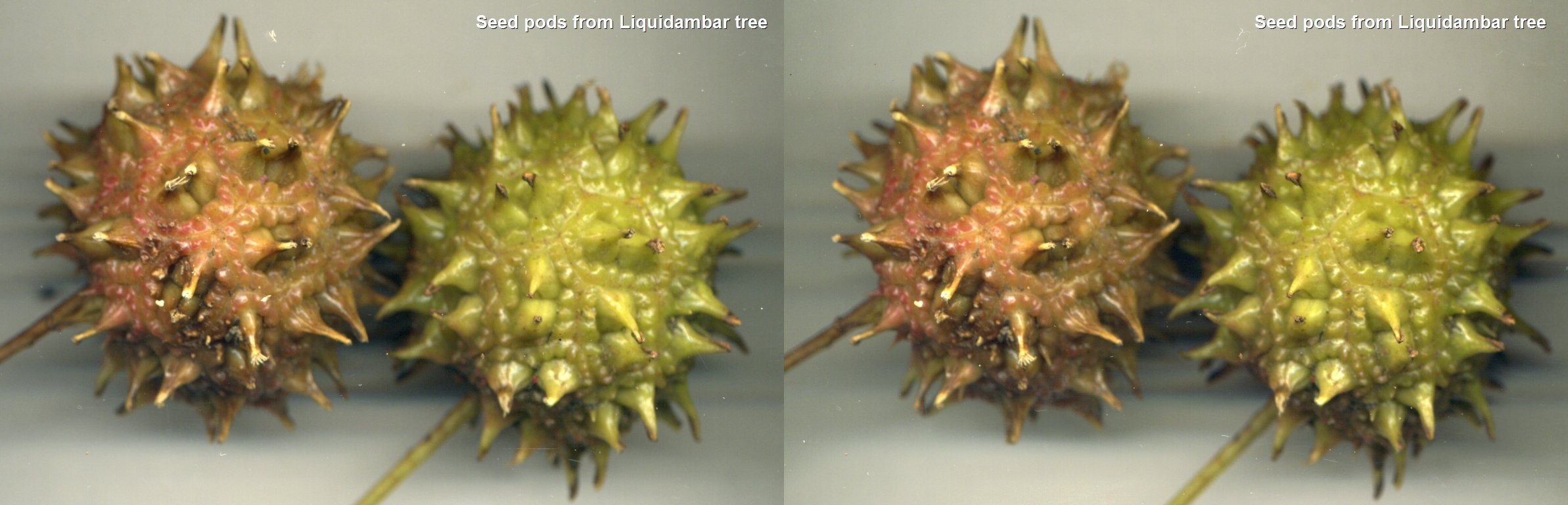
Right frame
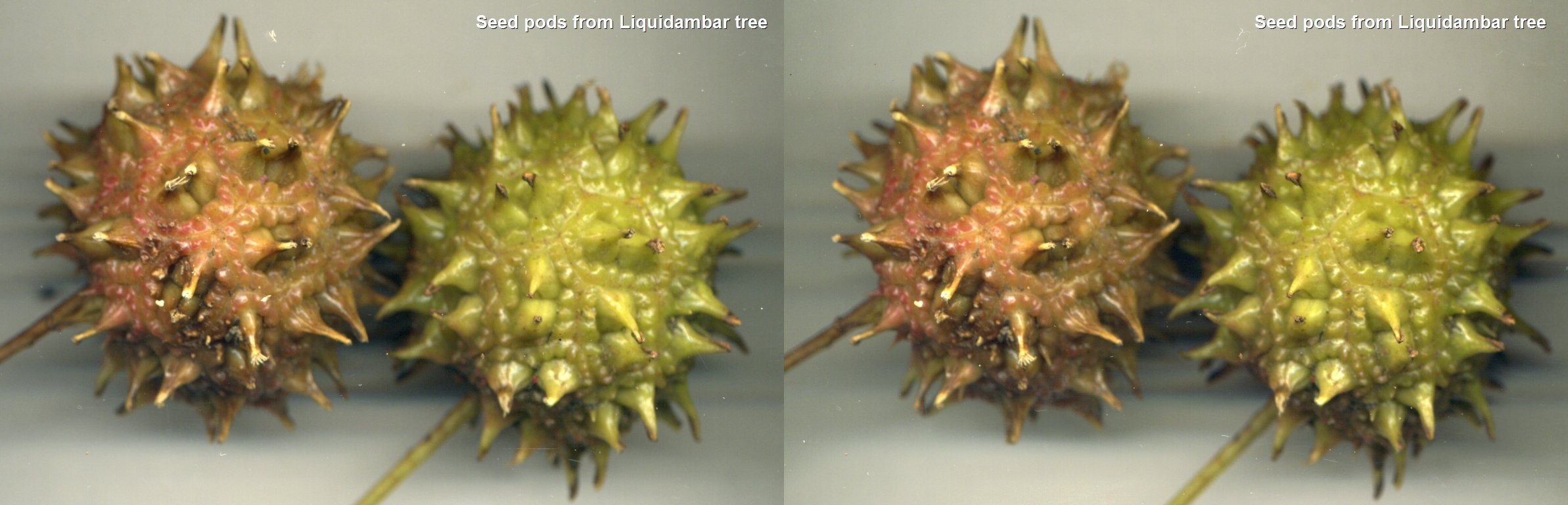
Parallel view
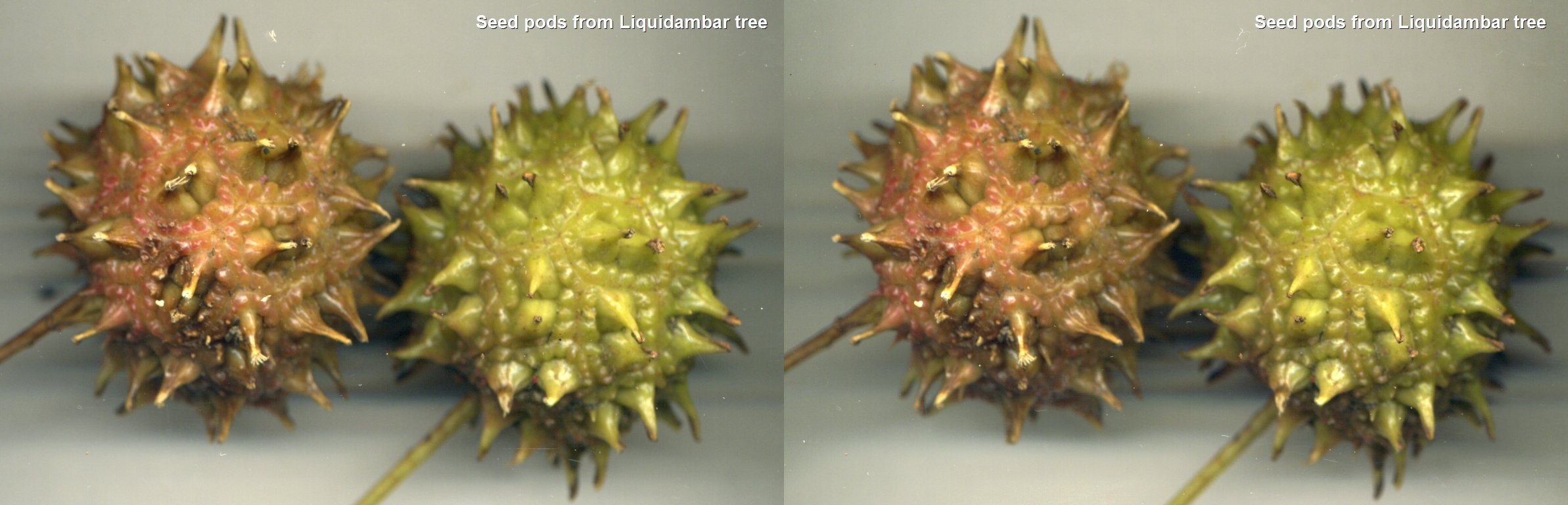
Cross-eye view
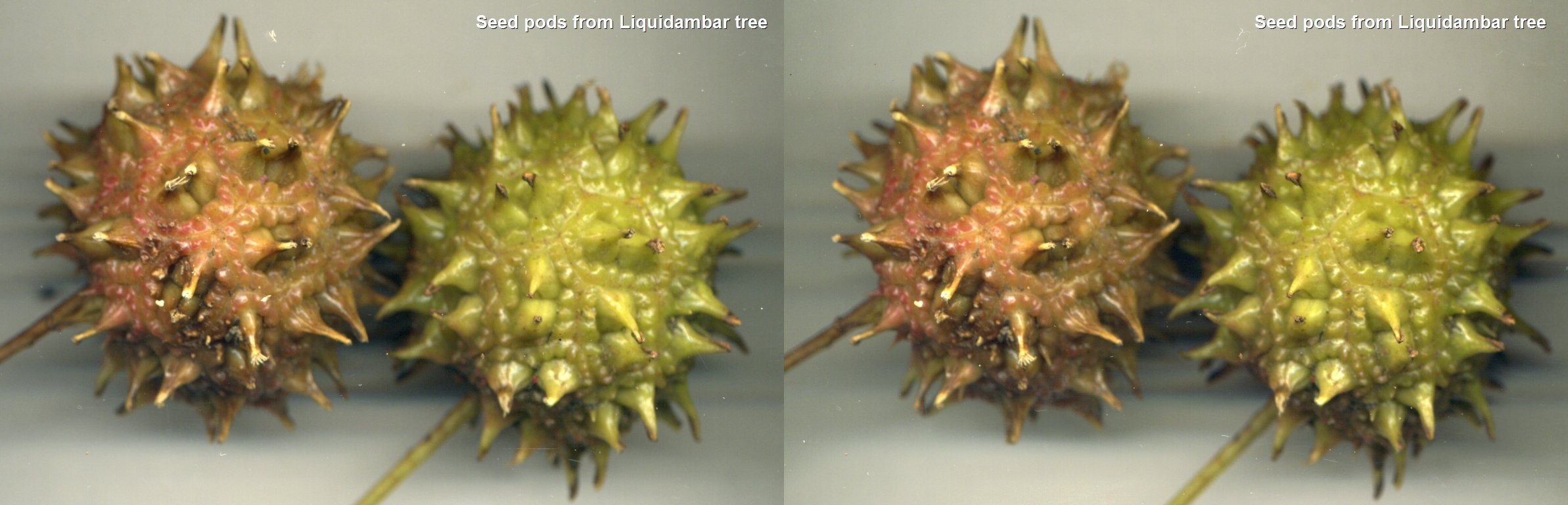

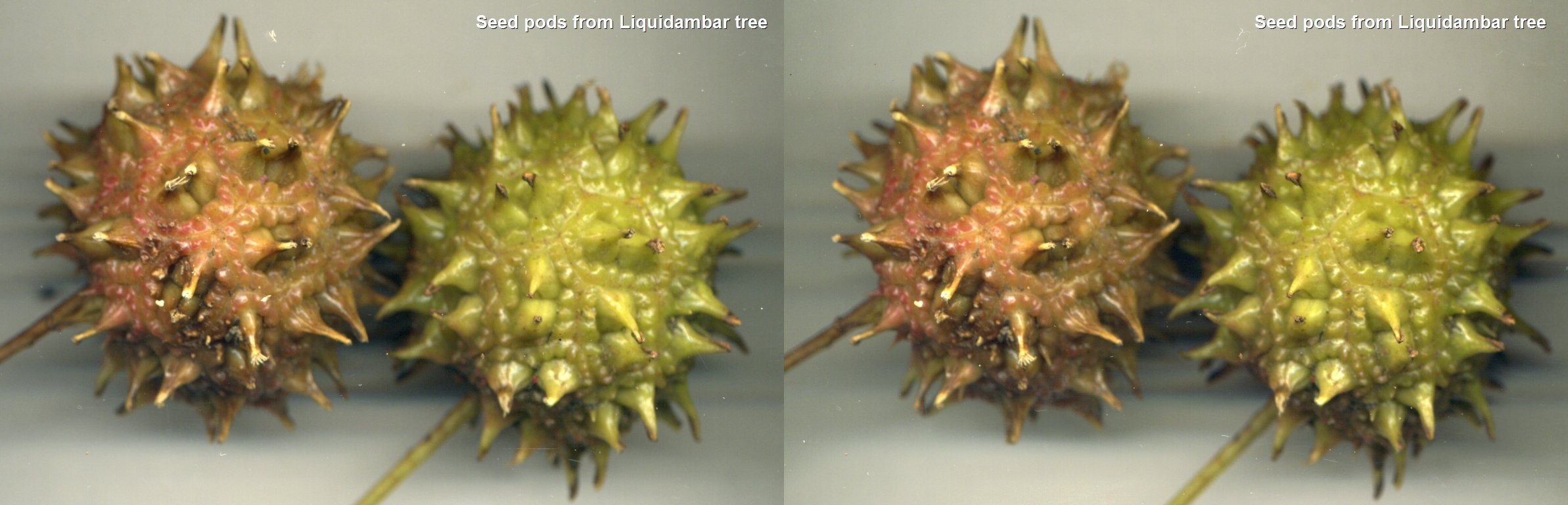
- Seed pods from Liquidambar tree

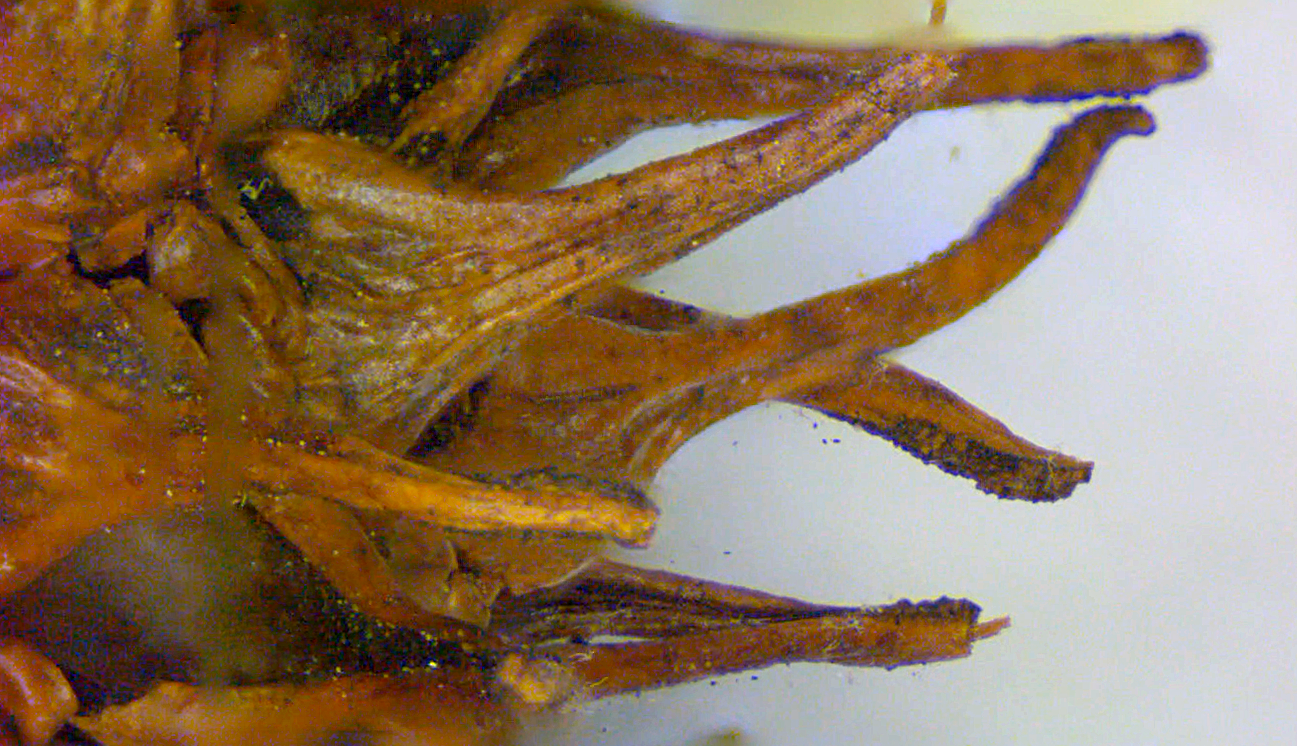
Spiny, woody seed pods of the American sweetgum tree, captured using a stereomicroscope

They are all large, deciduous trees, 25–40 m (82–131 ft) tall, with palmately 3- to 7-lobed leaves arranged spirally on the stems and length of 12.5 to 20 centimetres (4.9 to 7.9 in), having a pleasant aroma when crushed. Their leaves can be many colors such as bright red, orange, yellow, and even purple. Mature bark is grayish and vertically grooved. The flowers are small, produced in a dense globular inflorescence 1–2 centimetres (0.39–0.79 in) diameter, pendulous on a 3–7 centimetres (1.2–2.8 in) stem. The fruit is a woody multiple capsule 2–4 centimetres (0.79–1.57 in) in diameter (popularly called a "gumball"), containing numerous seeds and covered in numerous prickly, woody armatures, possibly to attach to fur of animals. The woody biomass is classified as hardwood.

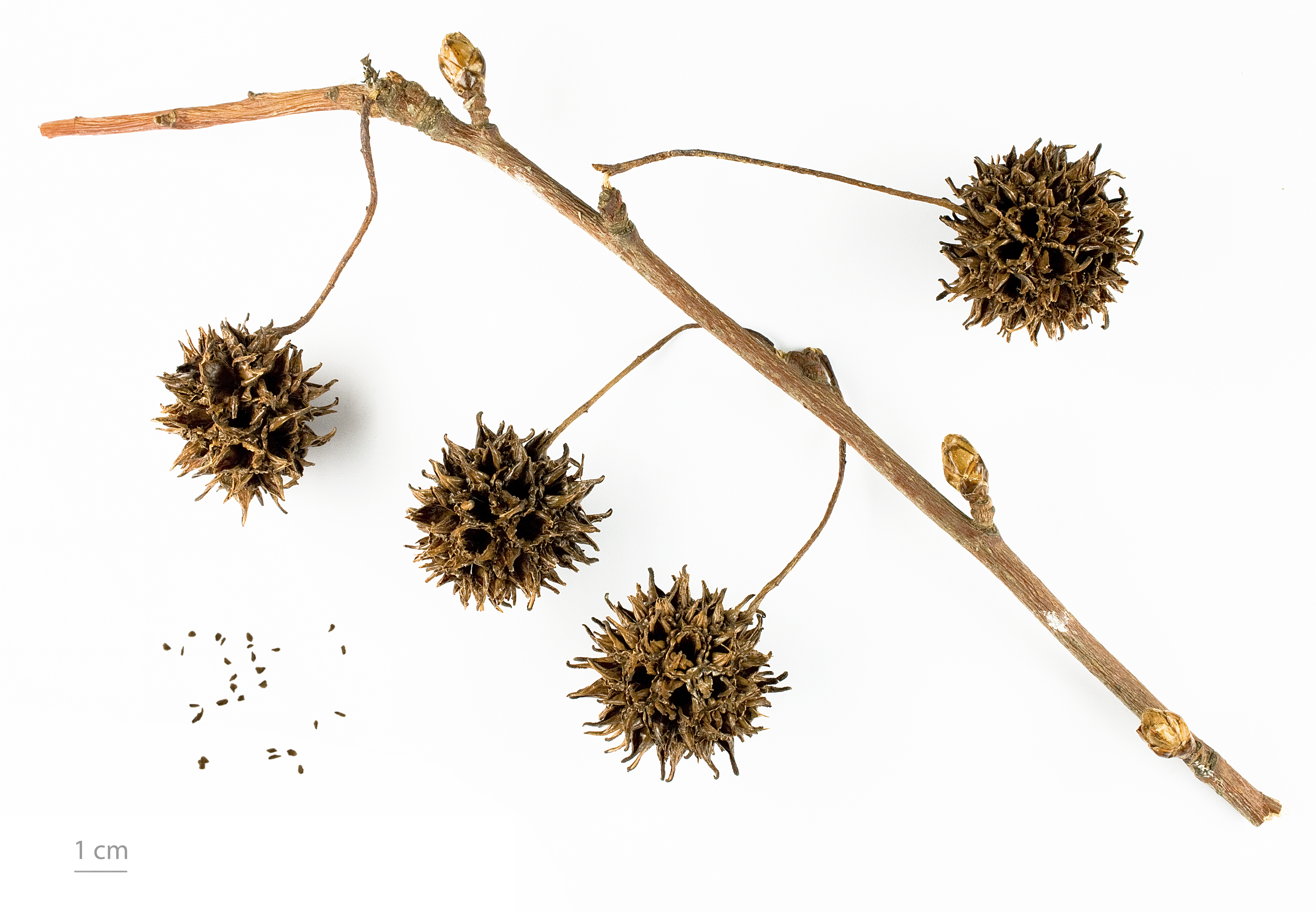
L. styraciflua fruits on stem with seeds to the side

At higher latitudes, Liquidambars are among the last of trees to leaf out in the spring, and also among the last of trees to drop its leaves in the fall/autumn, turning multiple colors. Fall/autumn colors are most brilliant where nights are chilly, but some cultivars color well in warm climates.

== Distribution ==
Species within this genus are native to Southeast and east Asia, the eastern Mediterranean, and eastern North America. Countries and regions in which they occur are: Indonesia (Nusa Tenggara, Java, Sumatra); Malaysia (Peninsular Malaysia); Thailand; Cambodia; Vietnam; China (including Tibet, Fujian, Guizhou, Hainan, Yunnan, Zhejiang), Taiwan, South Korea, Laos, Myanmar, Eastern India, Bhutan, Turkey, Greece (Rhodes), Nicaragua, Honduras, El Salvador, Guatemala, Belize, Mexico, and the eastern United States (from Texas to Connecticut). It is regarded as an artificially introduced species in other parts of India, Italy, Spain, and Belgium. In cultivation, they can be seen in warm temperate and subtropical climates around the world.

== Fossil records ==
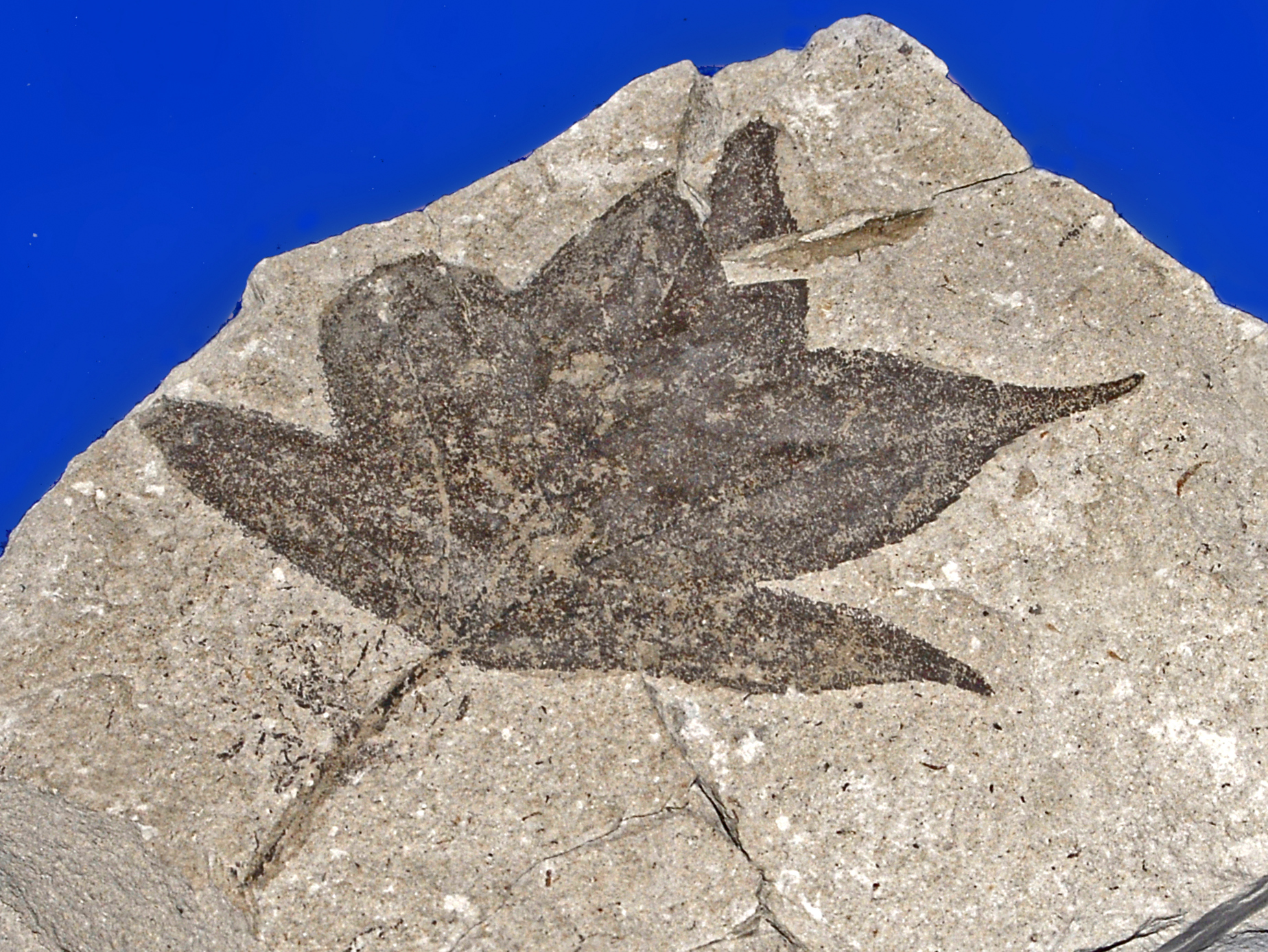
Fossil leaf of Liquidambar from Pliocene of Italy

This genus is known in the fossil record from the Cretaceous to the Quaternary (age range: 99.7 to 0.781 million years ago). The genus was much more widespread in the Tertiary, but has disappeared from Europe due to extensive glaciation in the north and the east–west oriented Alps and Pyrenees, which have served as a blockade against southward migration. It has also disappeared from western North America due to climate change, and also from the unglaciated (but nowadays too cold) Russian Far East. There are several fossil species of Liquidambar, showing its relict status today.

== Uses ==
The wood is used for furniture, interior finish, paper pulp, veneers and baskets of all kinds. The heartwood once was used in furniture, sometimes as imitation mahogany or Circassian walnut. It is used widely today in flake and strand boards. Sweetgum is a foodplant for various caterpillars. The American sweetgum is widely planted as an ornamental, within its natural range and elsewhere.

The hardened sap, gum resin, or storax excreted from the wounds of the sweetgum, for example, the American sweetgum (Liquidambar styraciflua), can be chewed on like chewing gum and has been long used for this purpose in the Southern United States. The sap was also believed to be a cure for sciatica, weakness of nerves, etc. It also has economic significance due to its balsam content, medicinal purposes, cosmetics, etc. Its purpose as an export also makes the sweetgum a key income source for local populations.

In Traditional Chinese medicine, lu lu tong, or "all roads open", is the hard, spiky fruit of native sweetgum species. It first appeared in Chinese medical literature in Omissions from the Materia Medica, by Chen Cangqi, in 720 AD. Bitter in taste, aromatic, and neutral in temperature, lu lu tong is claimed to promote the movement of blood and qi, water metabolism and urination, expels wind, and unblocks the channels. It is supposedly an ingredient in formulas for epigastric distention or abdominal pain, anemia, irregular or scanty menstruation, low back or knee pain and stiffness, edema with difficult urination, or nasal congestion.

In the fall/autumn, the trees drop their hard, spiky seedpods by the hundreds, which can become a serious nuisance on pavements and lawns. Some US cities have expedited permits to remove sweetgum trees.

In Louisiana folklore, a sharpened stick from this tree can be used to wound a cryptid known as the Parlangua (a hybrid of man and alligator).

== Gallery ==
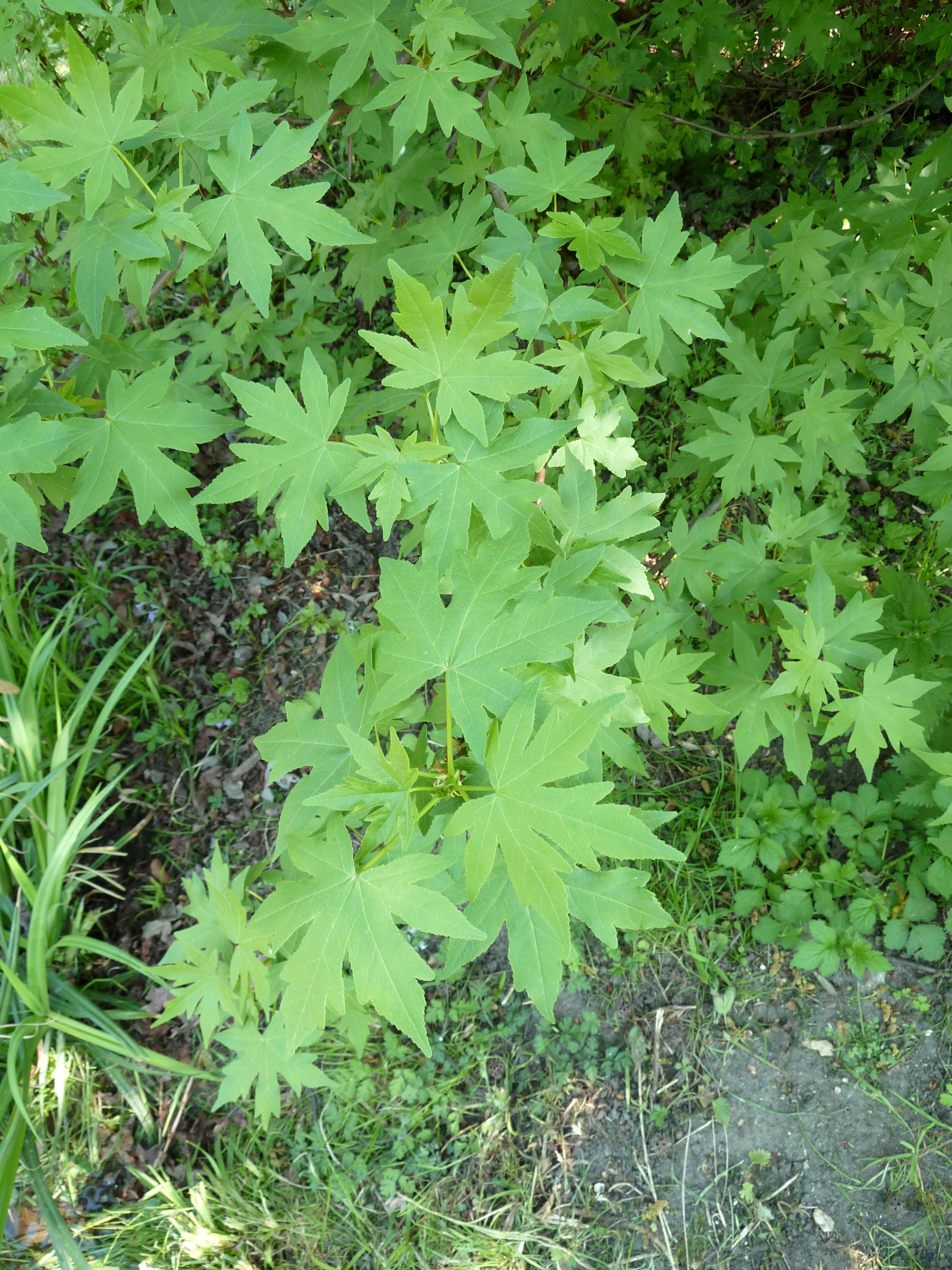
Foliage of Liquidambar orientalis

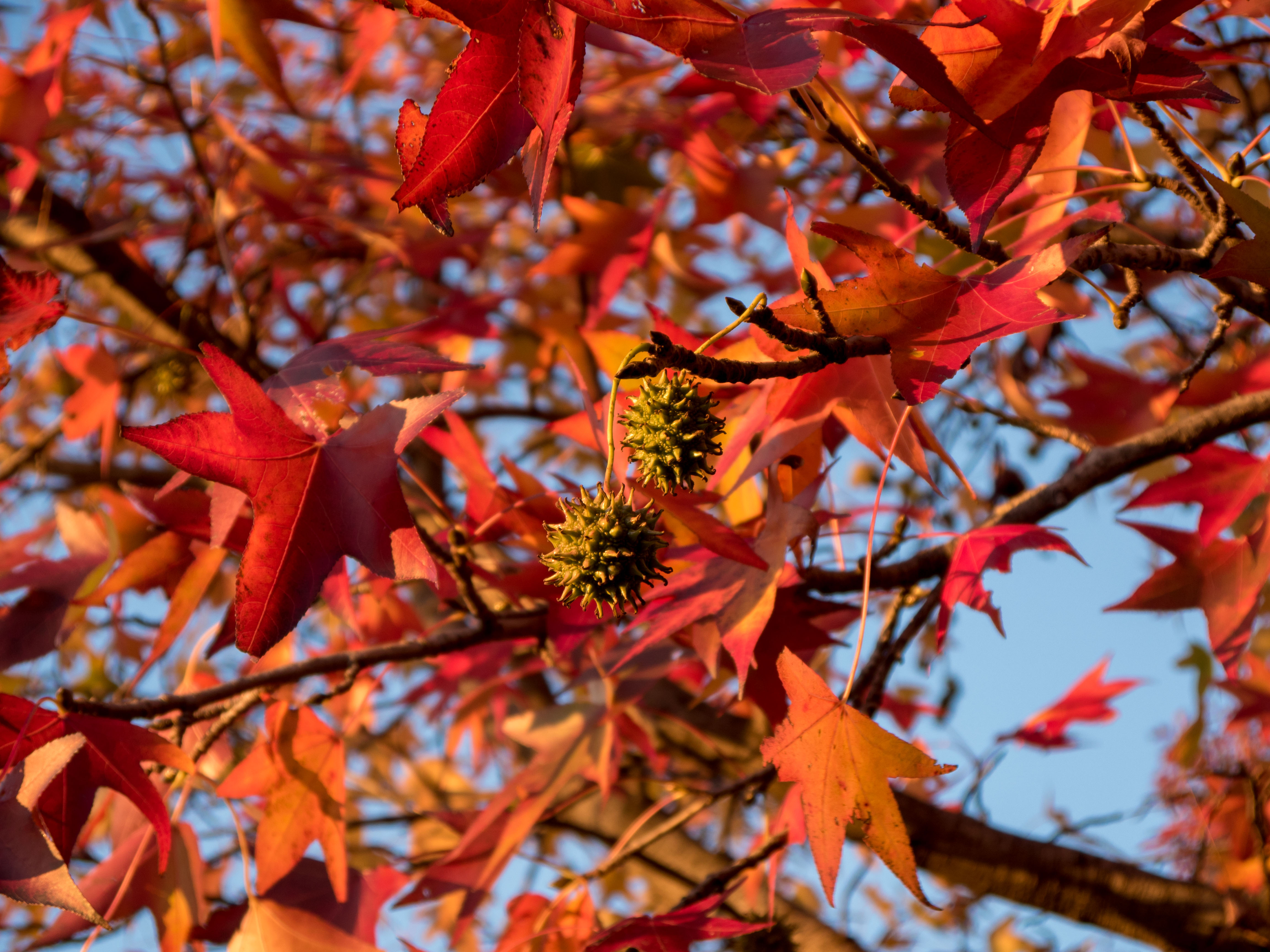
Sweetgum fall foliage and seedpods, Brooklyn, New York

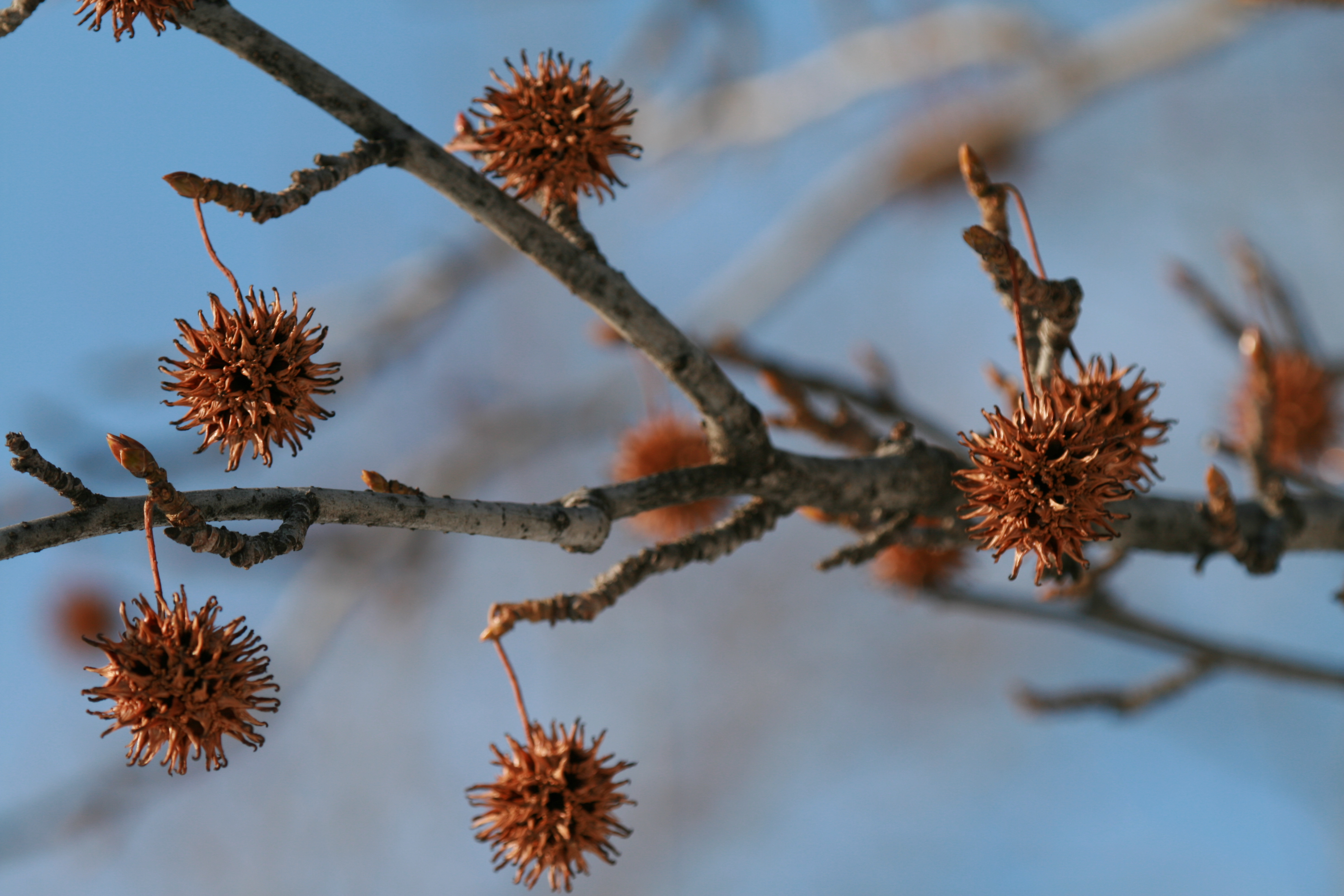
Sweetgum seed pods in Michigan during winter

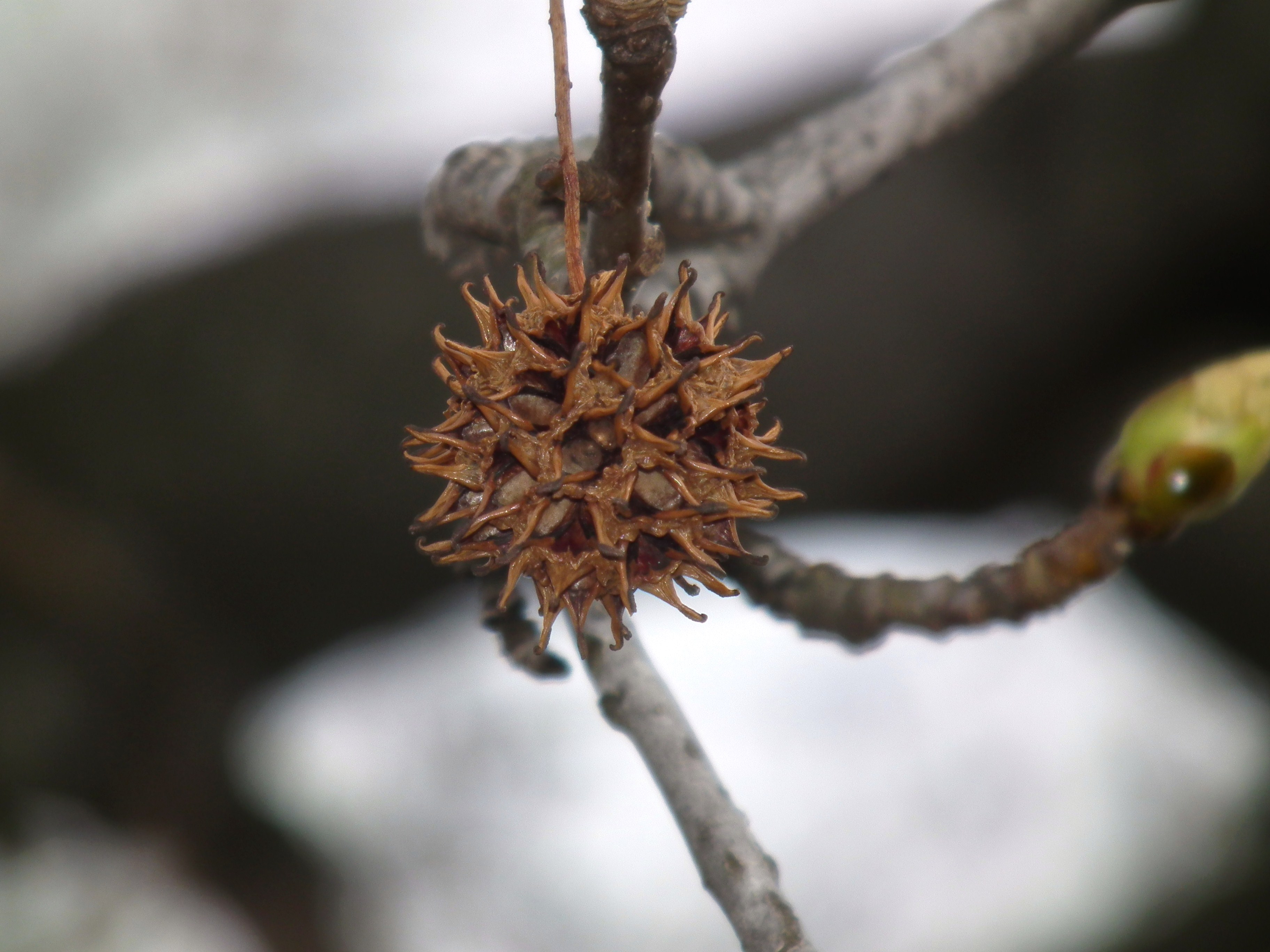
Closeup on a sweetgum seed pod
