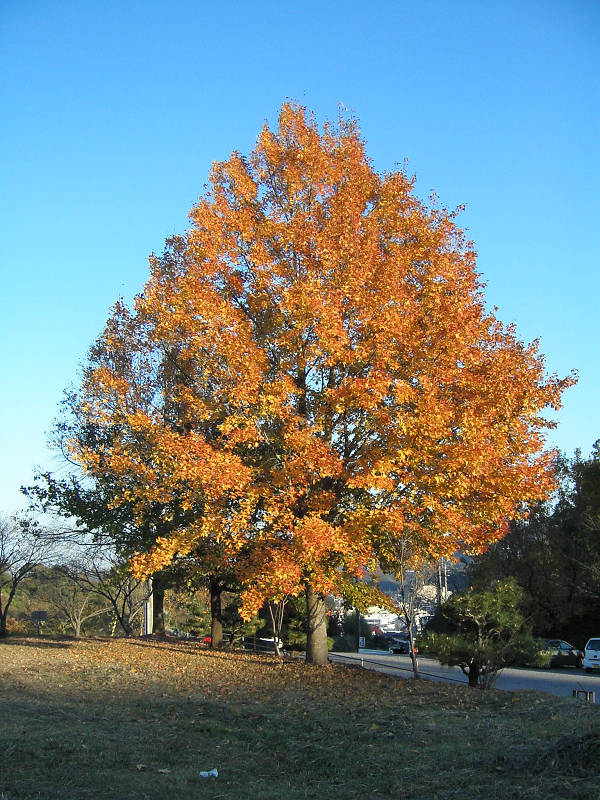
- In autumn

Conservation status
- Least Concern (IUCN 3.1)

Scientific classification
- Kingdom: Plantae
- Clade: Embryophytes
- Clade: Tracheophytes
- Clade: Spermatophytes
- Clade: Angiosperms
- Clade: Eudicots
- Order: Saxifragales
- Family: Altingiaceae
- Genus: Liquidambar
- Species: L. formosana

Binomial name
- Liquidambar formosana Hance

Synonyms
- Liquidambar acerifolia Maxim., non Unger, fossil name.; Liquidambar edentata Merr.; Liquidambar formosana var. monticola Rehder & E.H.Wilson; Liquidambar maximowiczii Miq.; Liquidambar rosthornii Diels; Liquidambar tonkinensis A.Chev.

= Liquidambar formosana =

Species of tree

Liquidambar formosana, commonly known as the Formosan gum, Chinese sweet gum and Formosa sweet gum, is a species of tree in the family Altingiaceae native to East and Southeast Asia.

== Description ==
Liquidambar formosana is a large deciduous tree that grows up to 30-40m tall. The leaves are 10~15 cm wide, and are three-lobed unlike five- to seven-lobed leaves of most American Liquidambar species. The foliage of the L. formosana turns a very attractive red color in autumn. Leaves grow in an alternate arrangement, and are simple, palmately-veined, with serrated margins. Roots can be aggressive and branches are usually covered with corky projections. The individual flowers of L. formosana are unisexual. However, both sexes can be found in the same plant (monoecious). Male flowers are in catkins, female flowers form dense spherical heads, and the fruit is burr-like because of the persistent styles.

== Distribution and habitat ==
Liquidambar formosana grows mostly in woodland in warm temperate zones. It requires moist soil and can grow in light to no shade areas. It is found in Hong Kong, Central and Southern China, South Korea, Taiwan, Laos and Vietnam.

== Uses ==
=== Medicinal ===
Liquidambar formosana has many medicinal uses. The leaves and roots are used in the treatment of cancerous growths. The stem bark is used in the treatment of fluxes and skin diseases. The fruits used in the treatment of arthritis, lumbago, oedema, oliguria, and decreased milk production and skin diseases. The resin from the stems is used to treat bleeding boils, carbuncles, toothache and tuberculosis. The trunk of this tree can be used for aromatic resin. The extract of this resin is used to promote blood circulation and relieve pain.

=== Other uses ===
Liquidambar formosana is rare in cultivation but in its native regions the wood is used for making tea chests and the leaves to feed silk worms.

== Gallery ==
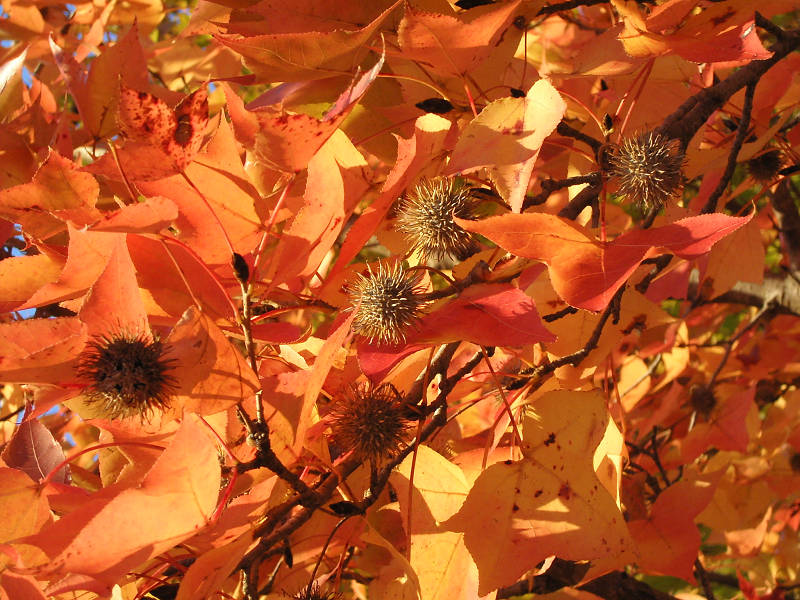
Fall foliage and seed pods

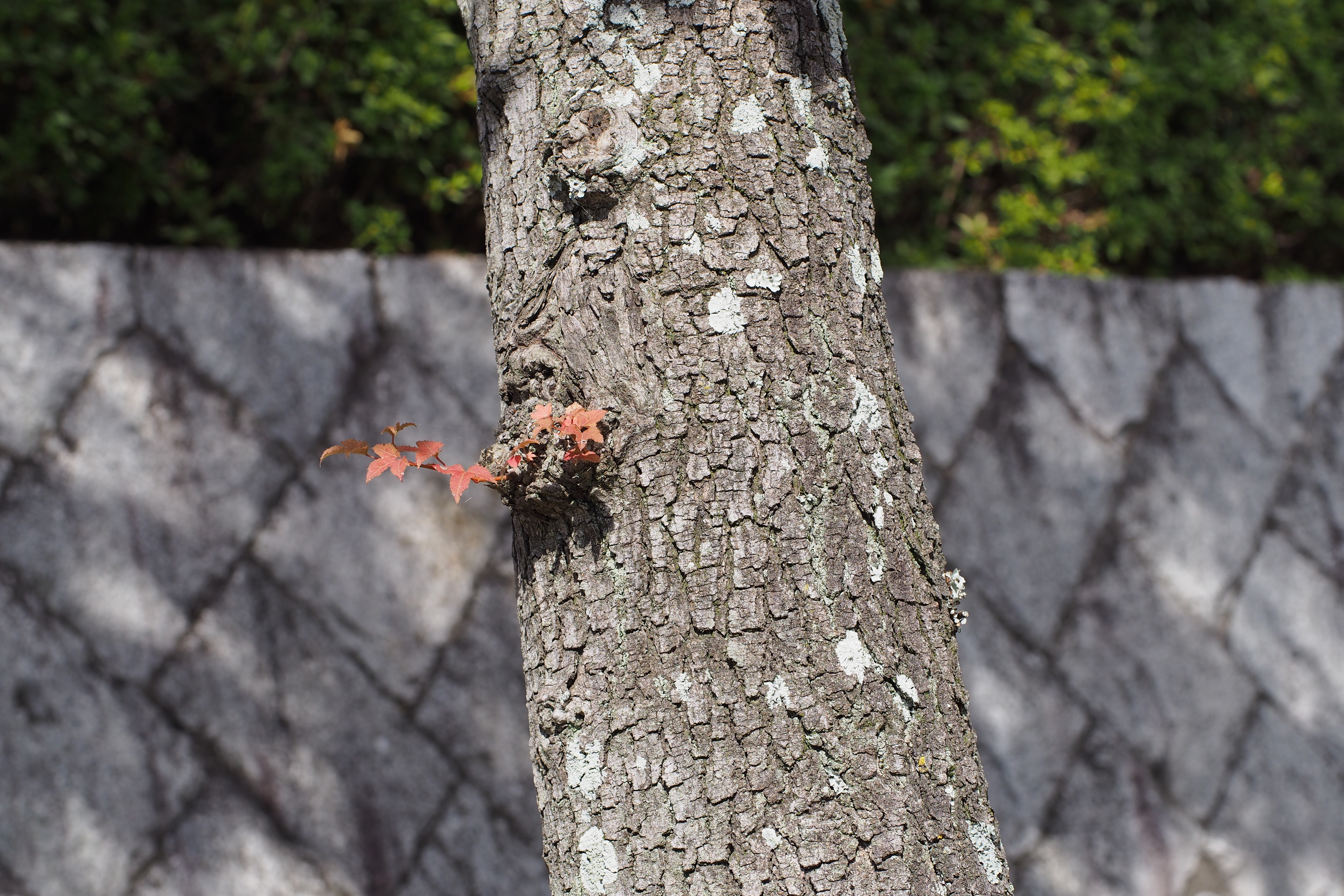
Bark detail

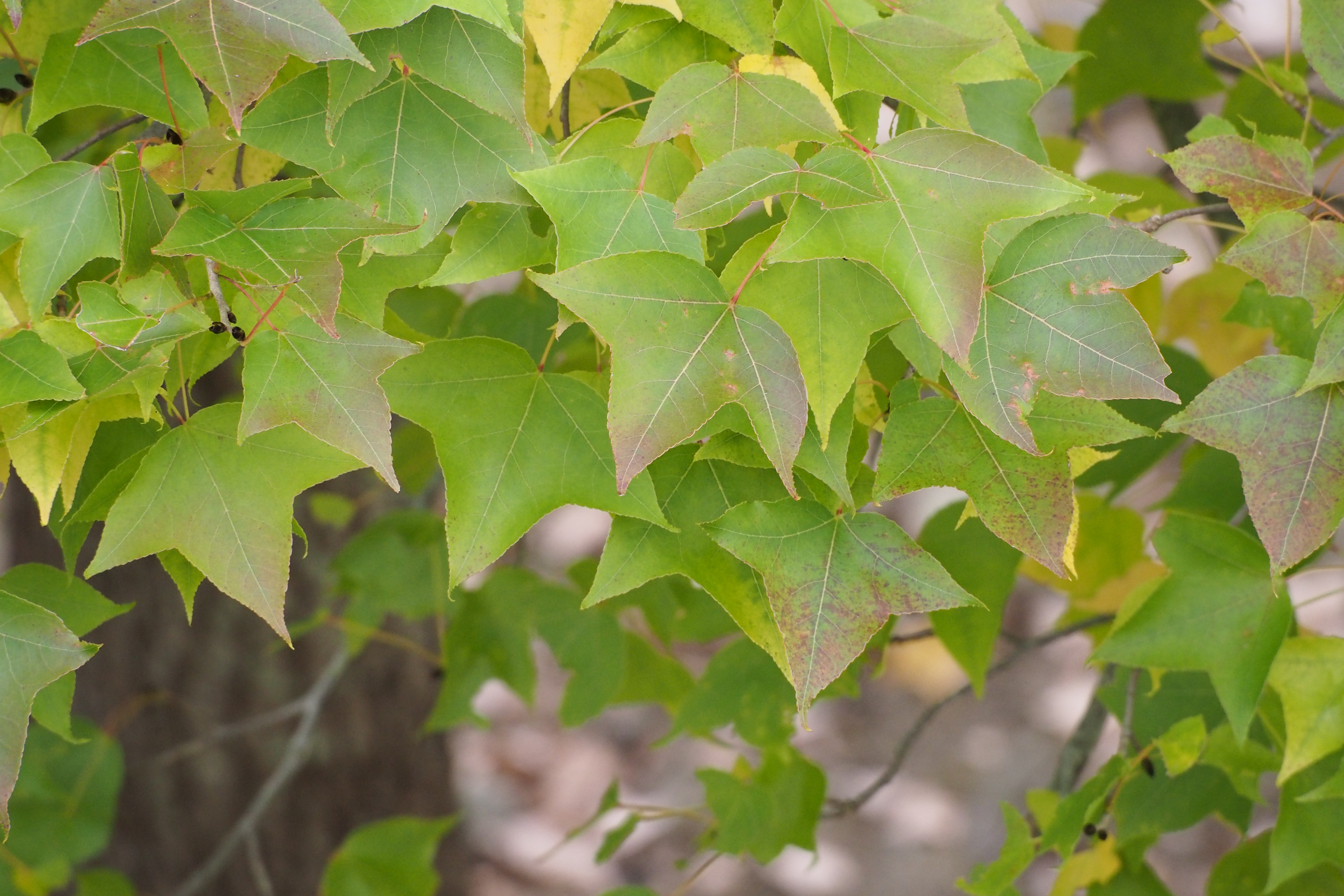
Foliage

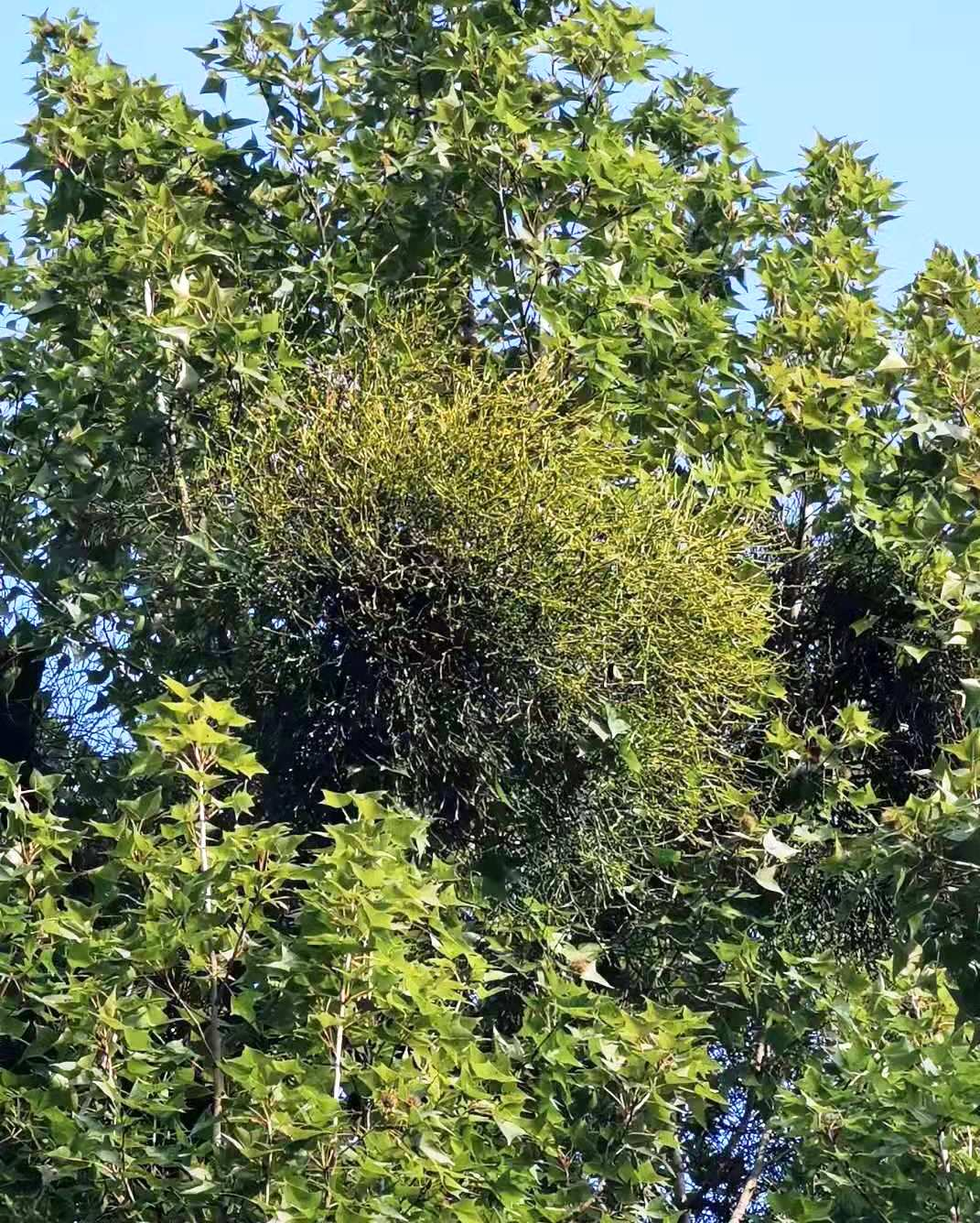
In Taiwan
