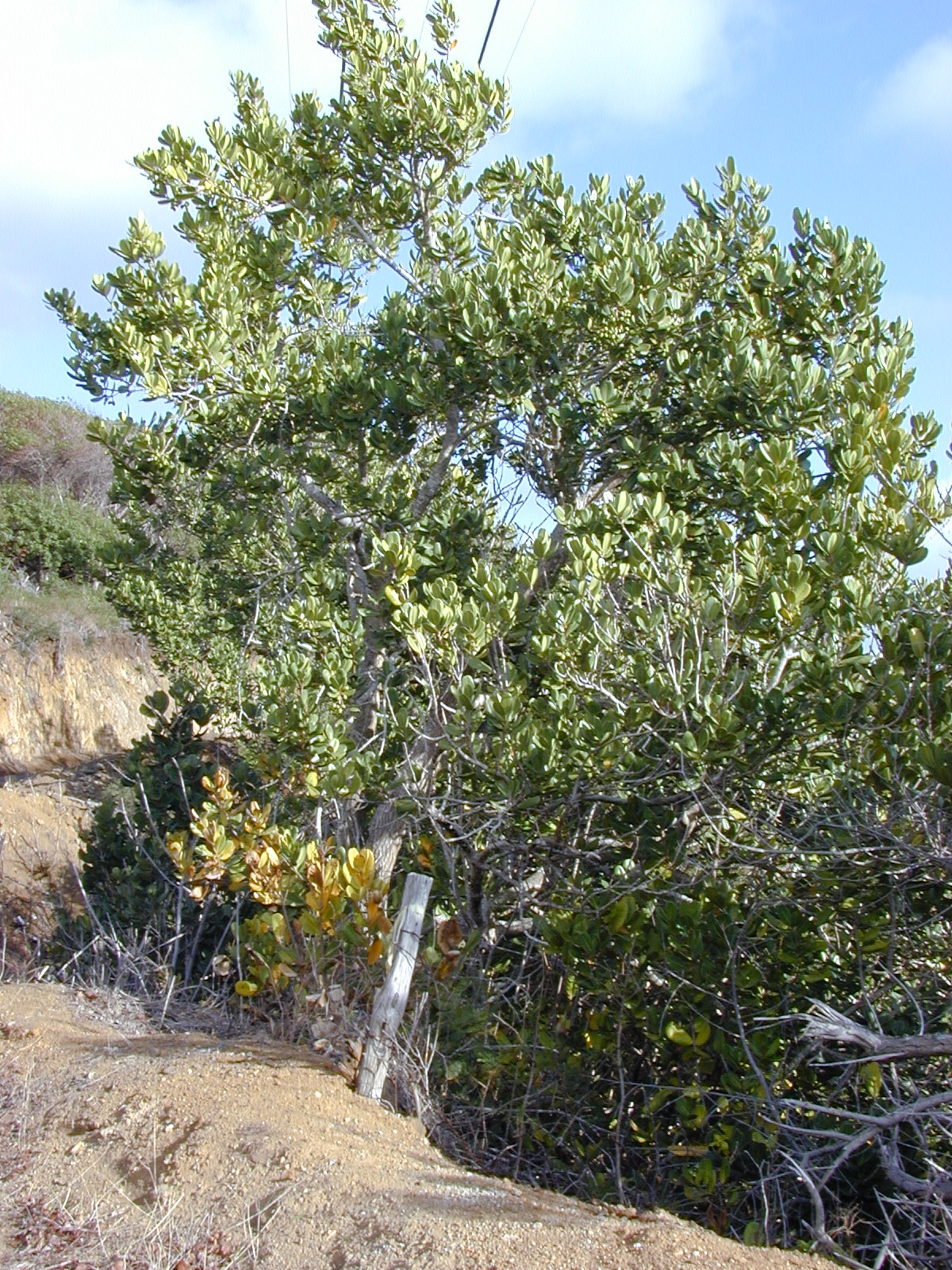

Scientific classification
- Kingdom: Plantae
- Clade: Tracheophytes
- Clade: Angiosperms
- Clade: Eudicots
- Clade: Asterids
- Order: Lamiales
- Family: Oleaceae
- Genus: Noronhia
- Species: N. emarginata

Binomial name
- Noronhia emarginata (Lam.) Thouars

= Noronhia emarginata =

Madagascar olive

Species of flowering plant

Noronhia emarginata (Madagascar olive; syn. Olea emarginata Lam.) is a species of Noronhia native to Madagascar, now naturalized on Mauritius, Réunion and Bermuda.

It is an evergreen shrub or small tree growing to 3–15 m tall. It has smooth bark, stout terete branches and flattened terminal twigs. The leaves are opposite, elliptical or obovate, up to 16 cm long and 10 cm broad, with an entire margin and an emarginate (notched) apex. The flowers are small, pale whitish-yellow, fragrant, with a four-lobed corolla. The fruit is a globose to turbinate drupe 2–3 cm diameter, apiculate, bright yellow ripening dark purple, drying hard, dark brown, slightly rough with a single pyriform, dark russet seed, 10–12 mm long. The cotyledons are unequal.

== Cultivation and uses ==
It is cultivated as an ornamental tree in subtropical and tropical regions, and has become an invasive species in some areas, notably Hawaii.

It is very tough in coastal and seaside locations, and has been successfully used in urban areas where air pollution, poor drainage, compacted soil and/or drought are common. It grows in part shade and in full sun. Soil tolerance is well-drained, acidic or alkaline clay, loam or sand. It has high drought tolerance, high aerosol salt tolerance and moderate soil salt tolerance.
