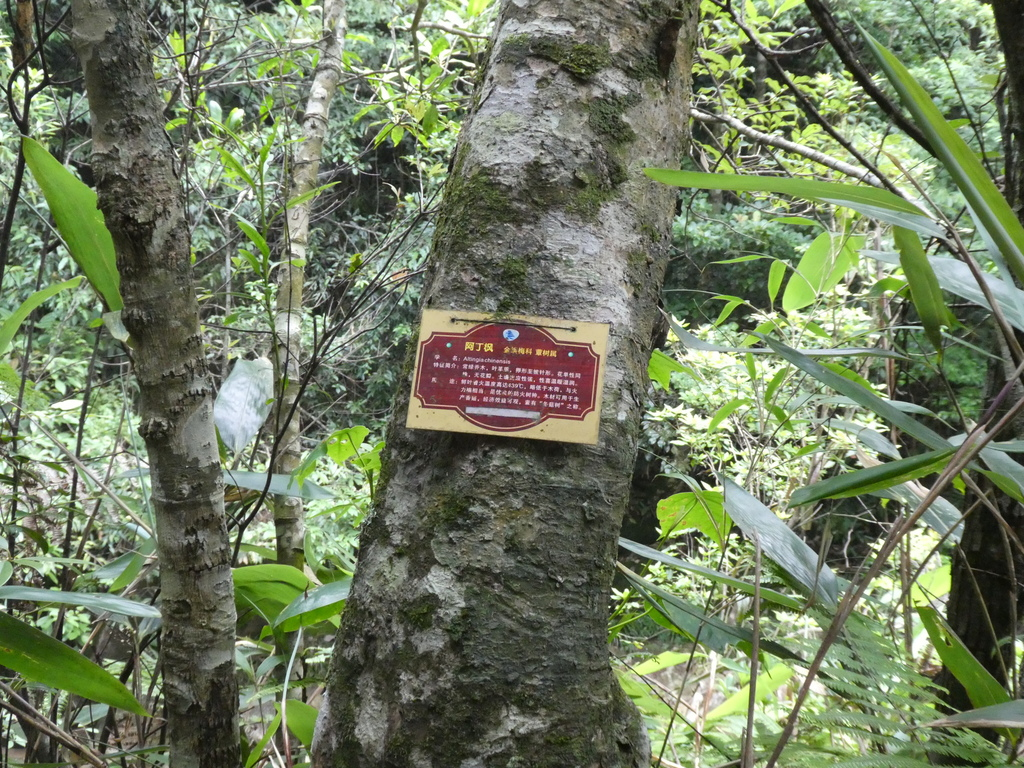

Conservation status
- Least Concern (IUCN 3.1)

Scientific classification
- Kingdom: Plantae
- Clade: Embryophytes
- Clade: Tracheophytes
- Clade: Angiosperms
- Clade: Eudicots
- Order: Saxifragales
- Family: Altingiaceae
- Genus: Liquidambar
- Species: L. chinensis

Binomial name
- Liquidambar chinensis Champ. ex Benth.

Synonyms
- Altingia chinensis (Champ. ex Benth.) Oliv. ex Hance; Altingia chinensis f. pubescens X.H.Song

= Liquidambar chinensis =

Species of flowering plant

Liquidambar chinensis, commonly known as the mountain litchi, is a species of flowering plant in the family Altingiaceae. It is a tree native to China and Vietnam.

Liquidambar chinensis was first validly described in 1852. The IUCN lists the species as of Least Concern. The wood is used for construction, and in the production of essential oils.

== Taxonomy ==
Liquidambar chinensis was first validly described by George Bentham in 1852, in Hooker's Journal of Botany and Kew Garden Miscellany. Bentham attributed the name to John George Champion. The species was transferred to the genus Altingia in 1873.

== Distribution ==
Liquidambar chinensis is native to the wet tropical biome of China (south-central, south-east, and Hainan) and Vietnam. The species is widespread in China.

IThe species' total extent of occurrence is over 180,000 square kilometres (69,000 sq mi), and it grows at elevations from 600–1,000 metres (2,000–3,300 ft).

== Description ==
Liquidambar chinensis is a tree that can grow up to 20 metres (66 ft) high. The heartwood is hard, and the sapwood is thin and fine-grained.

== Uses ==
Liquidambar chinensis is used for timber. The timber is used in construction and ship-building. Essential oils derived from the wood are used in medicine and perfume.

== Conservation ==
In 2018, the IUCN assessed Liquidambar chinensis as of Least Concern. It occurs in regions where deforestation is common, but this is not considered a major threat.

In Vietnam, the species is classified as endangered.

== Nomenclature ==
In Chinese, the species is known as 蕈樹 (xun shu), 廣東楓香 (guang dong feng xiang), 山荔枝 (shan li zhi), or 中華蕈樹 (zhong hua xun shu). In Vietnamese, it is known as To Hap Trung Hoa or Gai Bôm.
