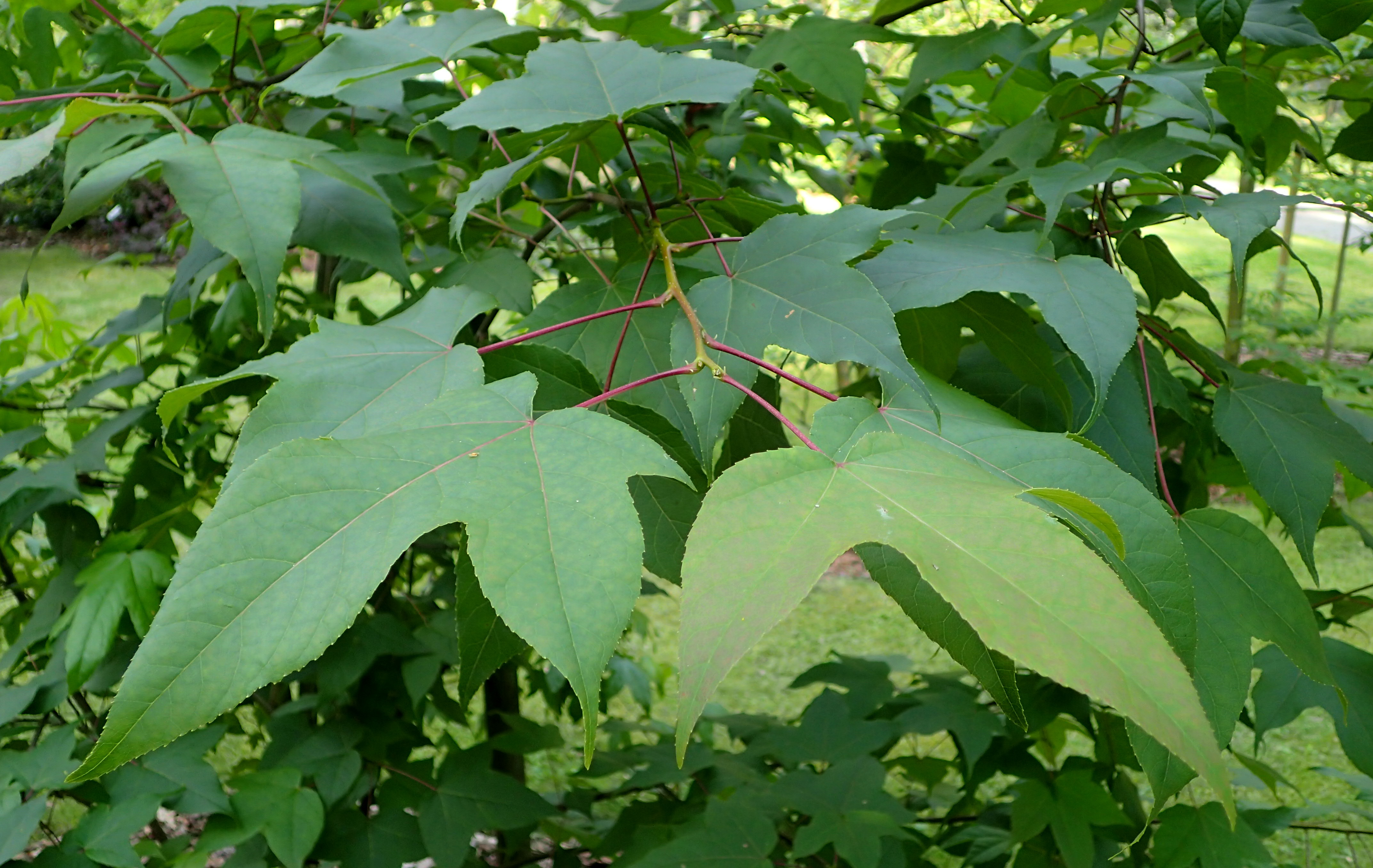

Conservation status
- Least Concern (IUCN 3.1)

Scientific classification
- Kingdom: Plantae
- Clade: Embryophytes
- Clade: Tracheophytes
- Clade: Angiosperms
- Clade: Eudicots
- Order: Saxifragales
- Family: Altingiaceae
- Genus: Liquidambar
- Species: L. acalycina

Binomial name
- Liquidambar acalycina H.T. Chang

= Liquidambar acalycina =

Species of flowering plant

Liquidambar acalycina, Chang's sweetgum, is a species of flowering plant in the family Altingiaceae native to southern China. Growing to 30–50 ft (9.1–15.2 m) tall and 20–30 ft (6.1–9.1 m) broad. It is a medium-sized deciduous tree with three-lobed maple-like leaves that turn red in autumn before falling. It is monoecious, meaning both male and female flowers appear on the same plant. The flowers are insignificant, yellow/green in colour, and are followed by small gum-balls that persist on the tree until winter. The wood exudes a sweet-smelling resin when pierced, giving the tree its common name.

Liquidambar acalycina is cultivated as an attractive ornamental tree for parks and gardens, and is hardy down to −15 °C (5 °F) or less. It requires cultivation in reliably moist, acid to neutral soil in full sun or partial shade. The cultivar 'Burgundy Flush', with leaves opening purple, turning green, then burgundy red in autumn, has gained the Royal Horticultural Society's Award of Garden Merit.

== Characteristics ==
Liquidambar acalycina is a deciduous tree that has a brown to black colored bark with a conical/pyramidal shape. It matures quickly to a medium height at about 10m in height, and 6m in width. The leaves have three lobes, making the tree similar to a maple tree. However, they are more star shaped than maple leaves.

The leaves emerge with a burgundy color in spring, but as they grow and mature in summer, they become green, which indicates their increasing ability to photosynthesize. When nearing fall, the leaves return to a red to purple color.

During the months of April to May, monoecious flowers begin to bud with yellow-green colors, but are insignificant for pollination in attracting pollinators. The fruit of this tree is a dark brown color. This tree serves as a shade tree for gardens. Liquidambar acalycina prefers soil that is acidic and clay-based.

== Distribution ==
This tree is native to East Asia, specifically in Southeast China. Other related species can be found in Southern China.

== Disease and infestation ==
This tree is generally stable in the specific climates in which it exists. However, some insects can infest the tree, such as webworms, bagworms, caterpillars, leaf miners, and borers. Other issues that some trees experience in this species are canker and bleeding necrosis, which can become extreme. If the plant is growing in alkaline soils, the trees may experience iron chlorosis. Other issues include dark spots on leaves, and wood rot.
