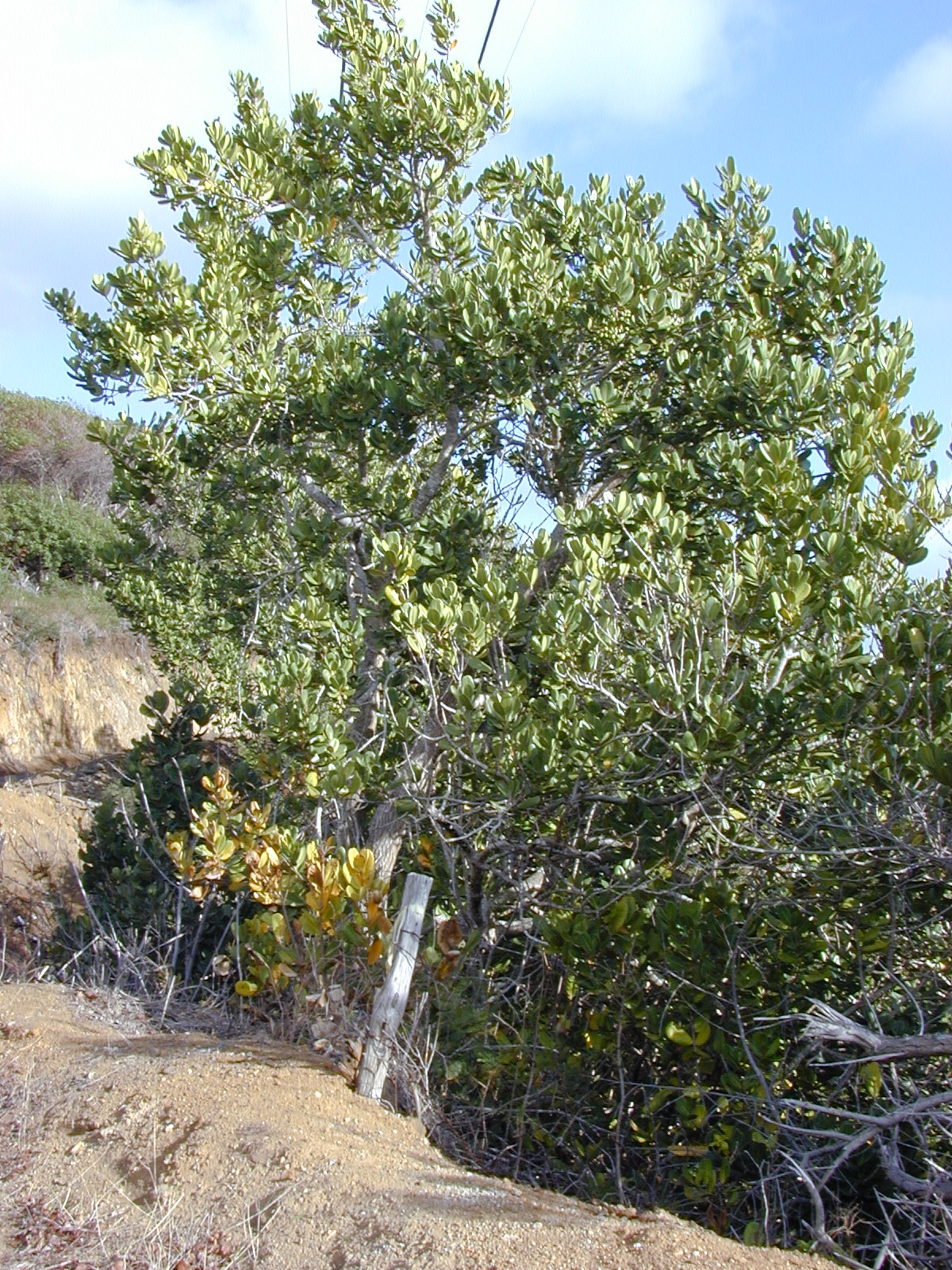
- Noronhia emarginata

Scientific classification
- Kingdom: Plantae
- Clade: Tracheophytes
- Clade: Angiosperms
- Clade: Eudicots
- Clade: Asterids
- Order: Lamiales
- Family: Oleaceae
- Tribe: Oleeae
- Subtribe: Oleinae
- Genus: Noronhia; Stadtman ex Thouars (1806)

Synonyms
- Binia Noronha ex Thouars (1806); Campanolea Gilg & G.Schellenb. (1913); Dekindtia Gilg (1902); Pogenda Raf. (1838)

= Noronhia =

Genus of flowering plants

Noronhia is a genus of 40 known species of flowering plants in the family Oleaceae, all but one native to Madagascar, the remaining species native to the Comoros Islands north of Madagascar. A few have become naturalized in Mauritius, Réunion, and Bermuda.

The species are deciduous or evergreen trees.

The genus is named in after the Spanish botanist Francisco Noronha.

== Species ==
Madagascar

1. Noronhia alleizettei Dubard
2. Noronhia ambrensis H.Perrier
3. Noronhia boinensis H.Perrier
4. Noronhia boivinii Dubard
5. Noronhia brevituba H.Perrier
6. Noronhia buxifolia H.Perrier
7. Noronhia candicans H.Perrier
8. Noronhia crassinodis H.Perrier
9. Noronhia crassiramosa H.Perrier
10. Noronhia cruciata H.Perrier
11. Noronhia decaryana H.Perrier
12. Noronhia divaricata Scott-Elliot
13. Noronhia ecoronulata H.Perrier
14. Noronhia emarginata (Lam.) Thouars
15. Noronhia gracilipes H.Perrier
16. Noronhia grandifolia H.Perrier
17. Noronhia humbertiana H.Perrier
18. Noronhia introversa H.Perrier
19. Noronhia lanceolata H.Perrier
20. Noronhia leandriana H.Perrier
21. Noronhia linearifolia Boivin ex Dubard
22. Noronhia linocerioides H.Perrier
23. Noronhia longipedicellata H.Perrier
24. Noronhia louvelii H.Perrier
25. Noronhia luteola H.Perrier
26. Noronhia mangorensis H.Perrier
27. Noronhia myrtoides H.Perrier
28. Noronhia oblanceolata H.Perrier
29. Noronhia ovalifolia H.Perrier
30. Noronhia peracuminata H.Perrier
31. Noronhia pervilleana (Knobl.) H.Perrier
32. Noronhia populifolia H.Perrier
33. Noronhia sambiranensis H.Perrier
34. Noronhia seyrigii H.Perrier
35. Noronhia tetrandra H.Perrier
36. Noronhia tubulosa H.Perrier
37. Noronhia verrucosa H.Perrier
38. Noronhia verticillata H.Perrier
39. Noronhia verticilliflora H.Perrier

Comoros

- Noronhia cochleata Labat
