= Francisco Noronha =

Spanish botanist (1748–1788)

Father Francisco Noronha (also spelled Francisco Noroña) (often incorrectly cited as Fernando do Noronha) (1748, Seville, Spain – January 12, 1788, Mauritius) was a Spanish physician and botanist who resided for some time at Manila, Luzon, Philippines, where he took much effort to organize the Royal Botanic Garden and stock it with valuable plants. Three sets of his water-colour drawings of Javan plants and one set of 108 numbered drawings still exist. Williams (2003) describes him as "a Spanish physician and botanist who had visited Madagascar", while Zuidervaart & Van Gent (2004) call him "a capable botanist from Manila" who in 1786 had taken over supervision of the museum of the Batavian Society of Arts and Sciences in Java.

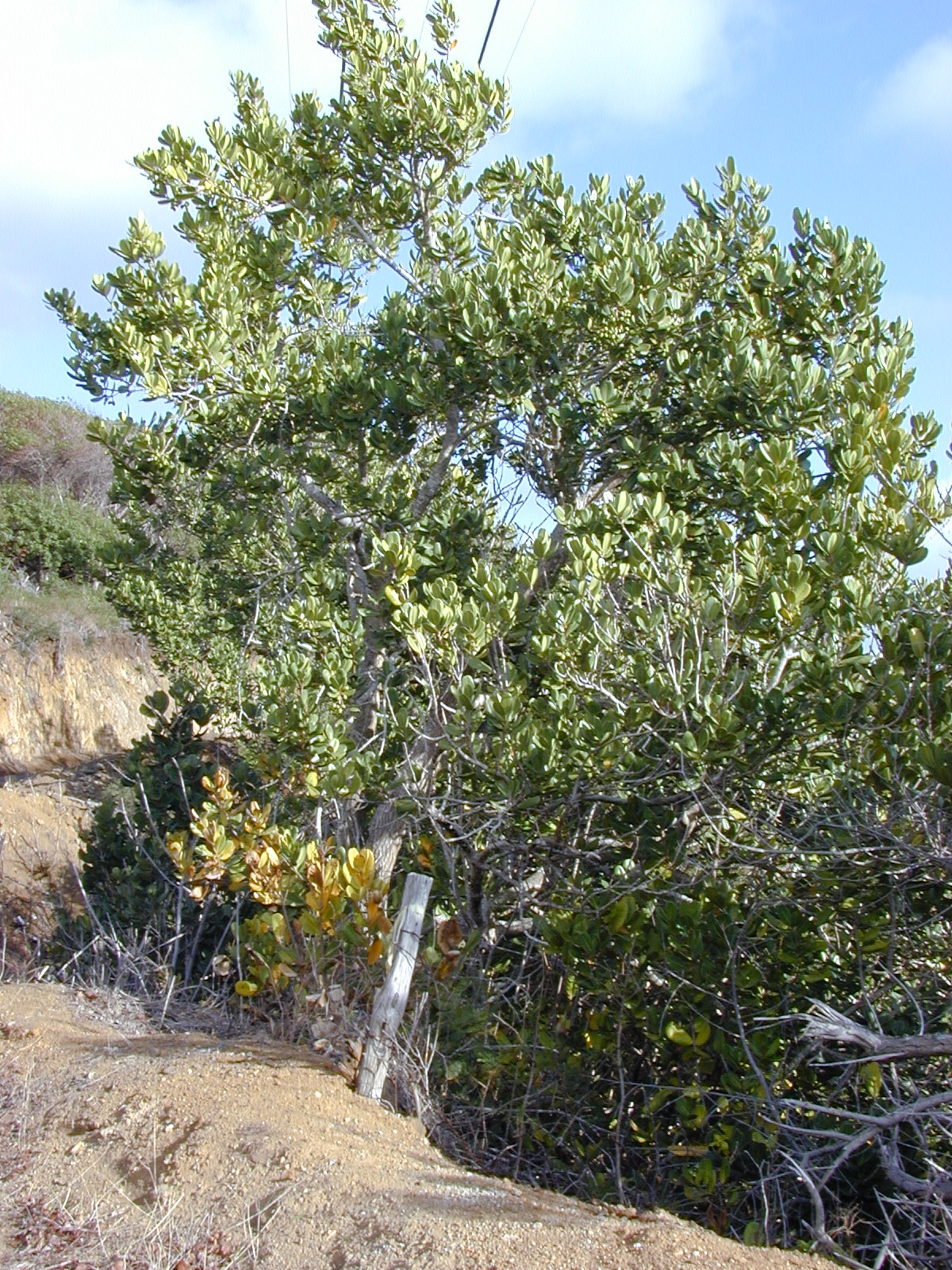
Noronhia emarginata Madagascar olive

He is commemorated in the genus Noronhia of the family Oleaceae (including Noronhia emarginata by the Dutch botanists Carl Ludwig Blume and Caspar Georg Carl Reinwardt) and in the Maderian native plant species of Crepis noronhaea Babc.

== Other sources ==
- Pinar García, Susana (2000), El sueño de las especias : viaje de exploración de Francisco Noroña por las Islas de Filipinas, Java, Mauricio y Madagascar, Madrid: Consejo Superior de Investigaciones Científicas, Departamento de Historia de la Ciencia, Cuadernos Galileo de historia de la ciencia 21, ISBN 84-00-07897-7.
- Pinar García, Susana (1995), "The Scientific Voyages of Francisco Noroña (1748–1788) in Southeast Asia and the Indian Ocean", Itinerario: European Journal of Overseas History, 1: 161–164.
- Pinar García, Susana (1997), "Little-Known Travellers and Natural Systems: Francisco Noroña's Exploratory Voyage through the Islands of the Indian Ocean (1784–1788)", Arch. Nat. Hist., 24: 127–144, doi:10.3366/anh.1997.24.1.127.
- Pinar García, Susana; Puig-Samper Mulero, Miguel Angel; Pelayo López, Francisco (1995), "Francisco Noroña, un naturalista español en el Océano Índico", in Mallo Gutiérrez, Tomás; Pacheco Fernández, Daniel; Díez Torre, Alejandro R. (eds.), De la ciencia ilustrada a la ciencia romántica : actas de las II Jornadas sobre "España y las Expediciones Científicas en América y Filipinas", Madrid: Doce Calles, Ateneo Científico, Literario y Artístico, pp. 109–120, ISBN 978-84-87111-53-2
- Williams, Roger Lawrence (2003), French Botany in the Enlightenment: The Ill-fated Voyages of La Pérouse and His Rescuers, Springer-Verlag, p. 116, ISBN 1-4020-1109-1.
- Zuidervaart, Huib J.; Van Gent, Rob H. (2004), "A Bare Outpost of Learned European Culture on the Edge of the Jungles of Java", Isis, 95 (1): 1–33, doi:10.1086/423509, PMID 15301065, S2CID 20292427.
