= Jun Wen =

Botanist

- Born: 27 December 1963 (age 62); Hubei, China
- Education: Central China Agricultural University (BS) Ohio State University (PhD)
- Scientific career
- Fields: Botany
- Workplaces: Colorado State University Chicago Field Museum National Museum of Natural History
- Author abbrev. (botany): J.Wen

Jun Wen (Chinese: 文军, Born December 27, 1963) is an evolutionary biologist and curator at the Smithsonian's National Museum of Natural History in the Department of Botany and has worked in the Laboratory of Molecular Systematics. She researches the monography, phylogenetics, biogeography, and ethnobotany of the plant families Araliaceae and Vitaceae. She has published over 190 scientific papers.

== Life and career ==
Jun Wen was born on 27 December in 1963 in Hubei, China. in 1984 she graduated from the Central China Agricultural University (Also known as Huazhong Agricultural University) with a BS in Forestry. She attended Ohio State University and received a PhD in Biology in 1991. She completed a postdoctoral position at the Arnold Arboretum at Harvard University in 1994 and then moved to the Smithsonian for a postdoctoral fellowship. She was appointed as an assistant professor and curator of the herbarium at Colorado State University in the Department of Biology in 1995. She became an associate curator for The Field Museum in Chicago, Illinois, in 2000 and remained there more 5 years. In 2005 she was hired at the Smithsonian's National Museum of Natural History as a research botanist and curator in the Department of Botany.

Wen has studied the world's oldest grape fossils while investigating the evolutionary history of the modern grape family.

Wen was as the treasurer of the American Society of Plant Taxonomists and in the finance section as an officer from 2006 to 2009. She was a council member of the International Association of Plant Taxonomists, a co-Editor-in-Chief of the Journal of Systematics and Evolution, and on many committees for several other societies. She was elected into the Washington Biologists' Field Club in 2009. In 2006 she was a guest professor at the Kunming Institute of Botany of the Chinese Academy of Sciences for a 4-year appointment. Wen and fellow botanists endorsed the Shenzhen Declaration in 2017, calling for plant sciences to contribute to sustainability efforts.

Wen works to inspire interest in science in young people. She is part of the Smithsonian's internship program called Youth Engagement Through Science (YES!) where she works with interns in high school and college to have hand-on experience and instruction.

== Select publications ==
- J Wen. 1999. Evolution of eastern Asian and eastern North American disjunct distributions in flowering plants. Annual Review of Ecology and Systematics 30 (1), 421–455.
- J Wen, EA Zimmer. 1996. Phylogeny and biogeography of Panax L.(the ginseng genus, Araliaceae): inferences from ITS sequences of nuclear ribosomal DNA. Molecular phylogenetics and evolution 6 (2), 167–177.
- S Lee, J Wen. 2001. A phylogenetic analysis of Prunus and the Amygdaloideae (Rosaceae) using ITS sequences of nuclear ribosomal DNA. American Journal of Botany 88 (1), 150–160.
- C Lee, J Wen. 2004. Phylogeny of Panax using chloroplast trnC–trnD intergenic region and the utility of trnC–trnD in interspecific studies of plants. Molecular phylogenetics and evolution 31 (3), 894–903.
- J Wen, GM Plunkett, AD Mitchell, SJ Wagstaff. 2001. The evolution of Araliaceae: a phylogenetic analysis based on ITS sequences of nuclear ribosomal DNA. Systematic Botany, 144–167.
- J Wen. 2001. Evolution of eastern Asian–eastern North American biogeographic disjunctions: a few additional issues. International Journal of Plant Sciences 162 (S6), S117-S122.
- J Wen, J Zhang, ZL Nie, Y Zhong, H Sun. 2014. Evolutionary diversifications of plants on the Qinghai-Tibetan Plateau. Frontiers in genetics 5, 4
- A Soejima, J Wen. 2006. Phylogenetic analysis of the grape family (Vitaceae) based on three chloroplast markers. American Journal of Botany 93 (2), 278–287.
- QY Xiang, WH Zhang, RE Ricklefs, H Qian, ZD Chen, J Wen, JH Li. 2004. Regional differences in rates of plant speciation and molecularevolution: a comparison between eastern Asia and eastern North America. Evolution 58 (10), 2175-2184.
- J Wen, SM Ickert-Bond. 2009. Evolution of the Madrean–Tethyan disjunctions and the North and South American amphitropical disjunctions in plants. Journal of Systematics and Evolution 47 (5), 331–348.
