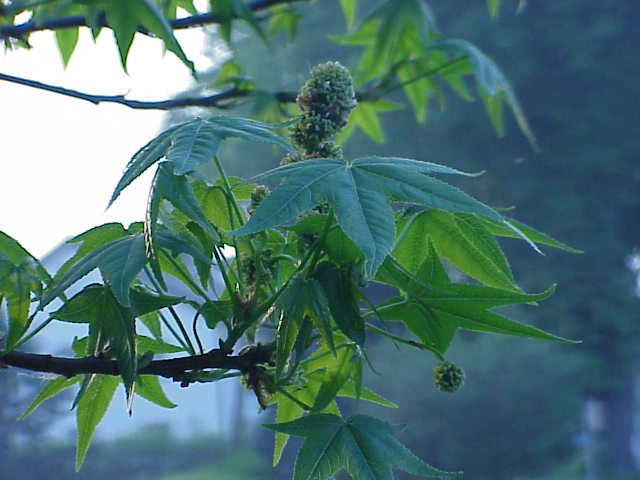
- Liquidambar styraciflua

Scientific classification
- Kingdom: Plantae
- Clade: Tracheophytes
- Clade: Angiosperms
- Clade: Eudicots
- Order: Saxifragales
- Family: Altingiaceae; Lindl.

Genera
- Liquidambar (incl. Altingia and Semiliquidambar); †Microaltingia; †Protoaltingia; †Paleoaltingia; †Steinhauera
- The range of Altingiaceae.

= Altingiaceae =

Family of flowering plants in the order Saxifragales

Altingiaceae is a small family of flowering plants in the order Saxifragales, consisting of wind-pollinated trees that produce hard, woody fruits containing numerous seeds. The fruits have been studied in considerable detail. They naturally occur in Central America, Mexico, eastern North America, the eastern Mediterranean, China, and tropical Asia. They are often cultivated as ornamentals and many produce valuable wood.

== Classification ==
Altingiaceae now consists of the single genus Liquidambar with 15 known species. Previously, the genera Altingia and Semiliquidambar were also recognised, but these represent a rapid radiation and have been difficult to separate reliably. Semiliquidambar has recently been shown to be composed of hybrids of species of Altingia and Liquidambar. This result had been expected for some time. Altingia and Liquidambar are known to be paraphyletic and a revision of the family has been prepared. Many of the species are closely related, and distinctions between them are likely to be artificial.

== History ==
The name "Altingiaceae" has a long and complex taxonomic history. Some attribute the name to John Lindley, who published it in 1846. Others say that the authority for the name is Paul F. Horaninov, who described the group in 1841. In the nineteenth and twentieth centuries, the family Altingiaceae was not generally accepted. Most authors placed these genera in Hamamelidaceae and this treatment has been followed in some recent works as well. In the twenty-first century, however, molecular phylogenetic studies have shown that including Altingiaceae in Hamamelidaceae makes Hamamelidaceae paraphyletic. The Angiosperm Phylogeny Group recognizes four families in the lineage including Altingiaceae. Cercidiphyllaceae and Daphniphyllaceae are sister. This clade is sister to Hamamelidaceae and these three families are sister to Altingiaceae. The clade is sister to Paeoniaceae

The family is named for the genus Altingia, now a synonym of Liquidambar. This genus was named in honor of Willem Arnold Alting (1724–1800), the Governor-General of the Dutch East Indies when Noronha visited Java.

== Evolution ==
Altingiaceae have an extensive fossil record. For most of the Paleogene and Neogene, they were more widely distributed than they are today. The stem group Altingiaceae diverged from the clade [Hamamelidaceae + (Cercidiphyllaceae + Daphniphyllaceae)] in the Turonian stage of the Cretaceous Period, about 90 mya (million years ago). The crown group Altingiaceae is much more recent, originating in the Eocene, about 40 Mya.

== Bibliography ==
- Ickert-Bond, Stefanie; Wen, Jun (17 December 2013). "A taxonomic synopsis of Altingiaceae with nine new combinations". PhytoKeys (31): 21–61. doi:10.3897/phytokeys.31.6251. PMC 3881344. PMID 24399902.
- Phylogeny and biogeography of Altingiaceae doi:10.1016/j.ympev.2005.12.003
- Altingiaceae at Angiosperm Phylogeny Website at Missouri Botanical Garden Website
- Family and Suprafamilial Names at James L. Reveal
- Altingiaceae in L. Watson and M.J. Dallwitz (1992 onwards). The families of flowering plants
- Altingiaceae in BoDD – Botanical Dermatology Database
