= John E. Hodge =

American chemist

John Edward Hodge
- Born: October 12, 1914; Kansas City, Kansas
- Died: January 3, 1996 (aged 81); Peoria, Illinois
- Education: University of Kansas
- Known for: Maillard reaction pathway
- Awards: Citation Classic - Science Citation Index (1979) for "Chemistry of browning reactions in model systems."; National Academy of Scientists - National Research Council (1977)
- Scientific career
- Fields: Chemistry

John Edward Hodge (October 12, 1914 – January 3, 1996) was an American chemist, born in Kansas City, Kansas, best known for establishing the mechanisms in the Maillard reaction pathway.

== Early life ==
Hodge was born in Kansas City, Kansas in 1914 to mother Annabelle Hodge and father John Alfred Hodge. He had one younger sister, Dorothy.

His father graduated with a master's in science from Indiana University in 1910, and moved to Kansas City where he worked as a science teacher and principal at the African-American Sumner High School, which the young John Hodge attended. Sumner High School was built in 1905 in response to Kansas City, Kansas being exempted from Kansas state law prohibiting racially segregated schools, and was to be "as well equipped as the existing Kansas City, KS High School." Despite the school board's emphasis on manual training courses, the high school focused on college preparation and academic excellence.

== Education ==
He gained a Bachelor's of Arts degree in mathematics 1936 and a Master's of Arts degree in organic chemistry from the University of Kansas in 1940. During his time at the University of Kansas, Hodge was elected to the Phi Beta Kappa scholastic society and the Pi Mu Epsilon honorary mathematics organization. Alongside his studies for a Master's, Hodge taught at Western University, Quindaro and worked as a chemist in the Kansas Department of Inspections.

== Career ==
From 1941 he worked at the recently opened USDA Northern Regional Research Center in Peoria, Illinois until his retirement in 1980. Here he worked on corn starch and other carbohydrates, investigating topics such as D-glucose production. Through this work he became interested in the Maillard reaction, a process where sugars react with amino acids. This reaction is involved in the browning of food during cooking but also the loss of sugar during glucose production from corn wet-milling. Hodge focused on pyrolysis reactions in production of different food flavor and aroma compounds produced through the Maillard reaction. He synthesized Amadori compounds, intermediates in the Maillard reaction. He found that isomaltol, a bakery aroma compound, was produced through a reaction between an Amadori compound reaction and lactose. He also determined the mechanism of maltol production, another baked product flavor and aroma compound. In addition, along with collaborator Friedrick Weygand of LMU Munich, he investigated the formation of reductones.

He taught at Western University (Kansas);, in 1972 held a visiting professorship at the University of Campinas in Sao Paulo, Brazil, and in 1984–1985 was an adjunct professor at Bradley University.

An article of his: Hodge, J. E. (1953). "Chemistry of browning reactions in model systems." Journal of Agricultural and Food Chemistry 1(15): 928-943 was named a "Citation Classic" by the Science Citation Index in 1979. In it he studied the chemistry of non-enzymatic browning reactions in dehydrated foods, such as the Maillard reaction. The article included a reaction scheme which is known as the "Hodge Scheme": this reaction pathway that he described still holds good today and remains widely cited. It has been suggested it be renamed to the Maillard-Hodge Reaction to reflect his greater contribution than Maillard. His seminal paper on the mechanisms of the Maillard Reaction, "Dehydrated Foods, Chemistry of Browning Reactions in Model Systems" has been cited over 1300 times .

== Personal life ==
Hodge married Beulah Payne, a chemistry student in St. Louis, in 1939. They had one son before Beulah died in 1942. Hodge later married Justine Mitchell in 1948. He had another son and two daughters with her.

Hodge died of cancer on January 3, 1996, in Peoria, Illinois.

== Awards ==
- American Chemical Society Division of Carbohydrate Chemistry - chairman
- Superior Service Award from U.S. Department of Agriculture (1953)
- Chairman of the Division of Carbohydrate Chemistry of the American Chemical Society (1964)
- National Academy of Scientists - National Research Council (1977)
- Honored at NIH Conference on the Maillard Reaction in Aging, Diabetes, and Nutrition (1988)
