= Atsunobu =

- Gender: Male

Origin
- Origin: Japanese
- Meaning: Different meanings depending on the kanji used

Atsunobu (written: 厚信 or 篤信) is a masculine Japanese given name. Notable people with the name include:

- Fujiwara no Atsunobu (藤原 敦信), Japanese nobleman and writer
- Atsunobu Ogata (緒方 厚信; born 1948), Japanese sprint canoeist
- Tomomatsu Atsunobu (友松 篤信; born 1948), Japanese international relations scholar

== Fictional characters ==
- Atsunobu Hayashimizu (林水 敦信), a character in the anime series Full Metal Panic? Fumoffu
