= Chūzen-ji =

Buddhist temple in Nikkō, Tochigi, Japan

- 中禅寺
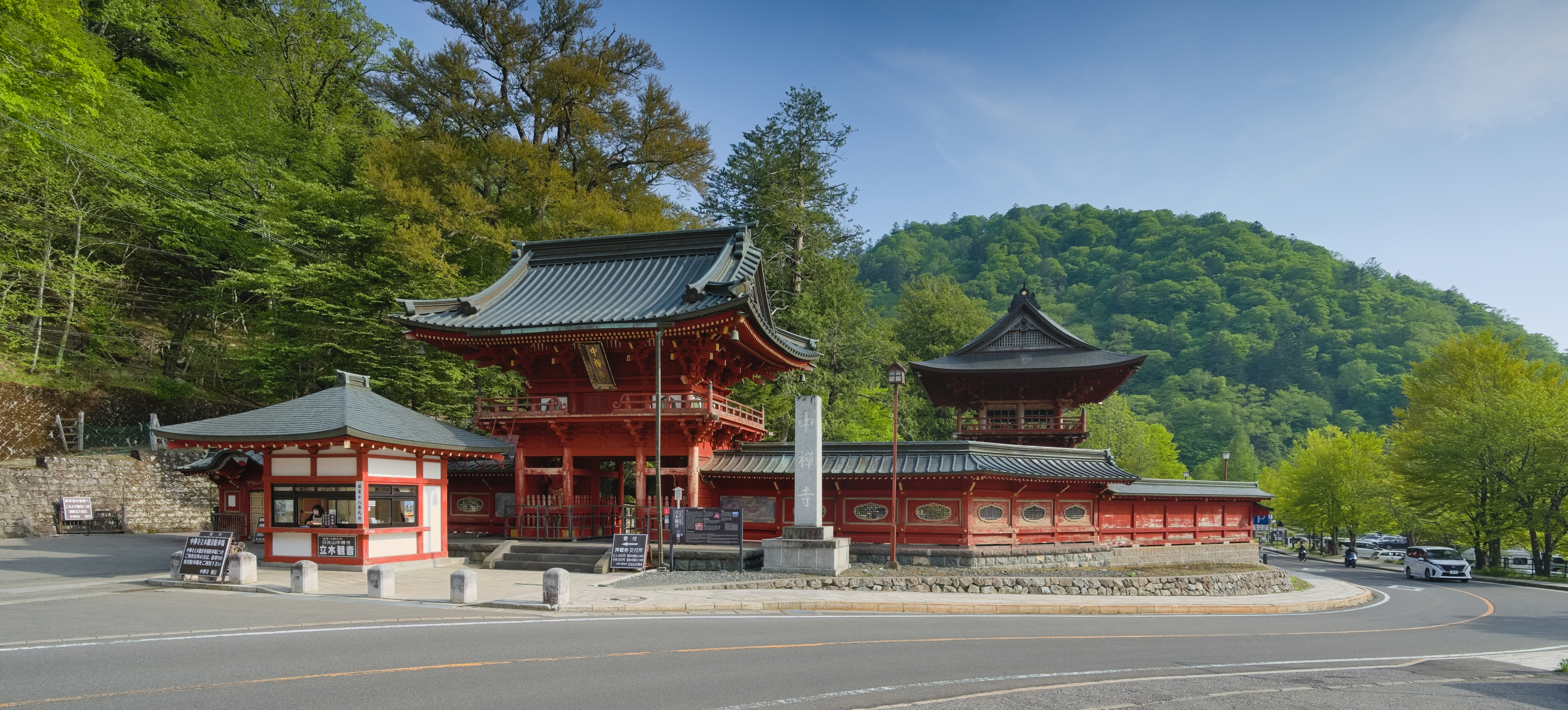
- Chūzen-ji Sanmon

- Location within Tochigi Prefecture Location within Japan

Religion
- Affiliation: Buddhist
- Deity: Jūichimen Senjū Kannon Bosatsu
- Rite: Tendai
- Status: functional

Location
- Location: 2482 Chūgūshi, Nikkō-shi, Kanagawa-ken 249-0001
- Country: Japan
- Coordinates: 36°43′51.3″N 139°29′30″E

Architecture
- Founder: unknown
- Completed: unknown
- National Important Cultural Property

Chūzen-ji (中禅寺) is a Buddhist temple standing on the shore of Lake Chuzenji of the city of Nikkō, Tochigi Prefecture, Japan. It belongs to the Tendai school of Japanese Zen and its honzon is a statue of Jūichimen Senjū Kannon Bosatsu. The temple's full name is Nikkō-san Rinaiji-betsuin Chūzen-ji (日光山 輪王寺別院 中禅寺).The temple is the 18th stop on the Bandō Sanjūsankasho pilgrimage route.

== History ==
The details of the founding of this temple is uncertain. According to the temple's legend, it was founded by the priest Shōdō in 784. The priest was on a boat on Lake Chuzenji when he noticed an apparition of Kannon Bosatsu stating by a katsura tree. He cut down the tree and carved a statue, which become the honzon of the new temple.

The temple was originally a jingū-ji for Futarasan Jinja, a Shinto shrine near the entrance to Mount Nantai, and was named Fudaraku-san Chūzen-ji. The earliest mention of the temple in historical records is in an account by Fujiwara no Atsumitsu, who made a pilgrimage in 1141.

Per the Azuma Kagami, Minamoto no Yoritomo donated a set of statues of the Four Heavenly Kings, which were installed next to the main image.

The temple was reconstructed in 1315. The temple was demoted to be a subsidiary of Rinnō-ji in 1872 due to the Meiji government's shinbutsu bunri policy of separating Buddhism from Shinto.

In 1902, the temple was destroyed by a typhoon, during which its main hall was washed away into Lake Chuzenji. The honzon statue was later found floating in the lake relatively intact, and in enshrined in the temple's current Kannon-dō.

== Images ==
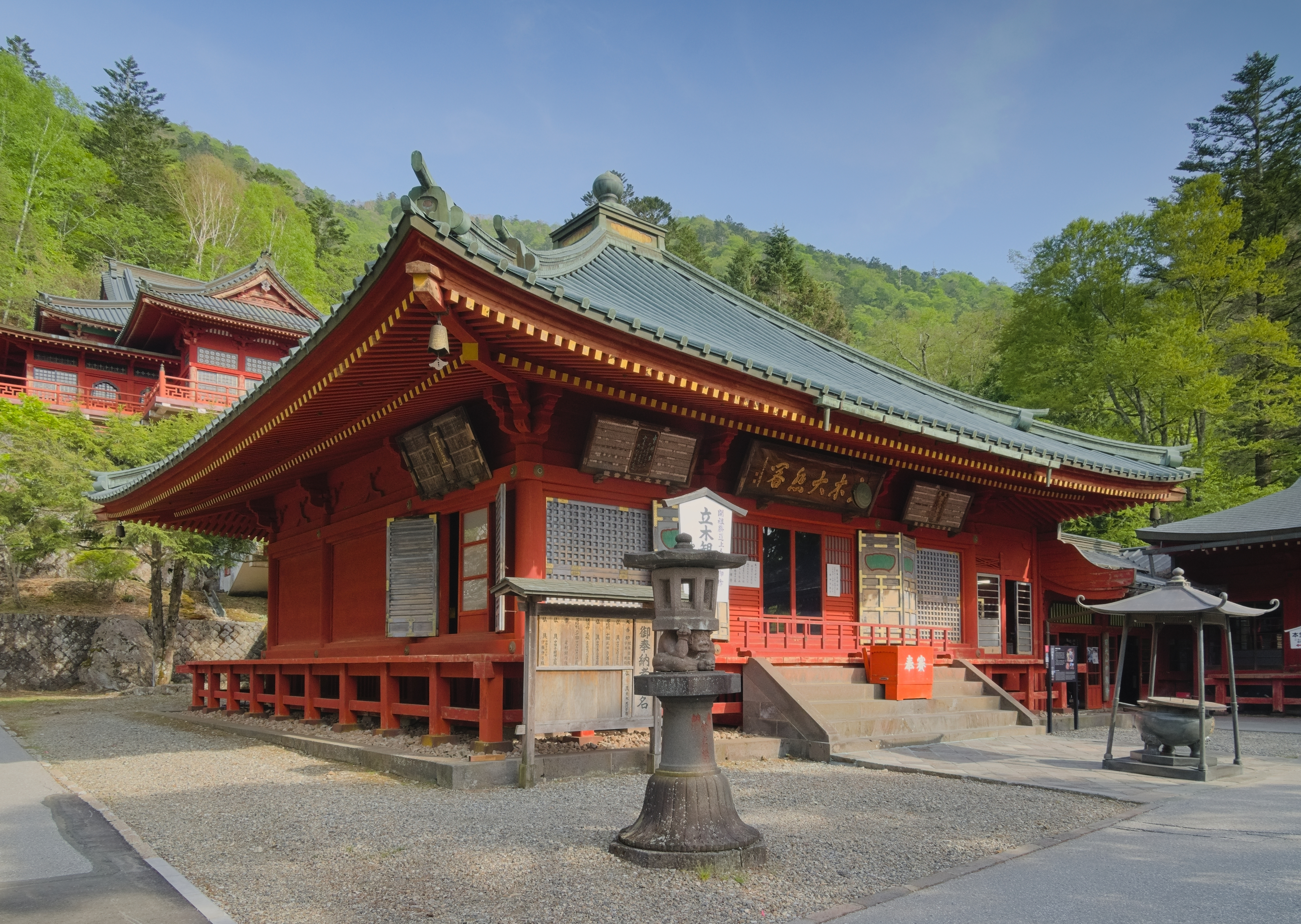
Kannon-dō

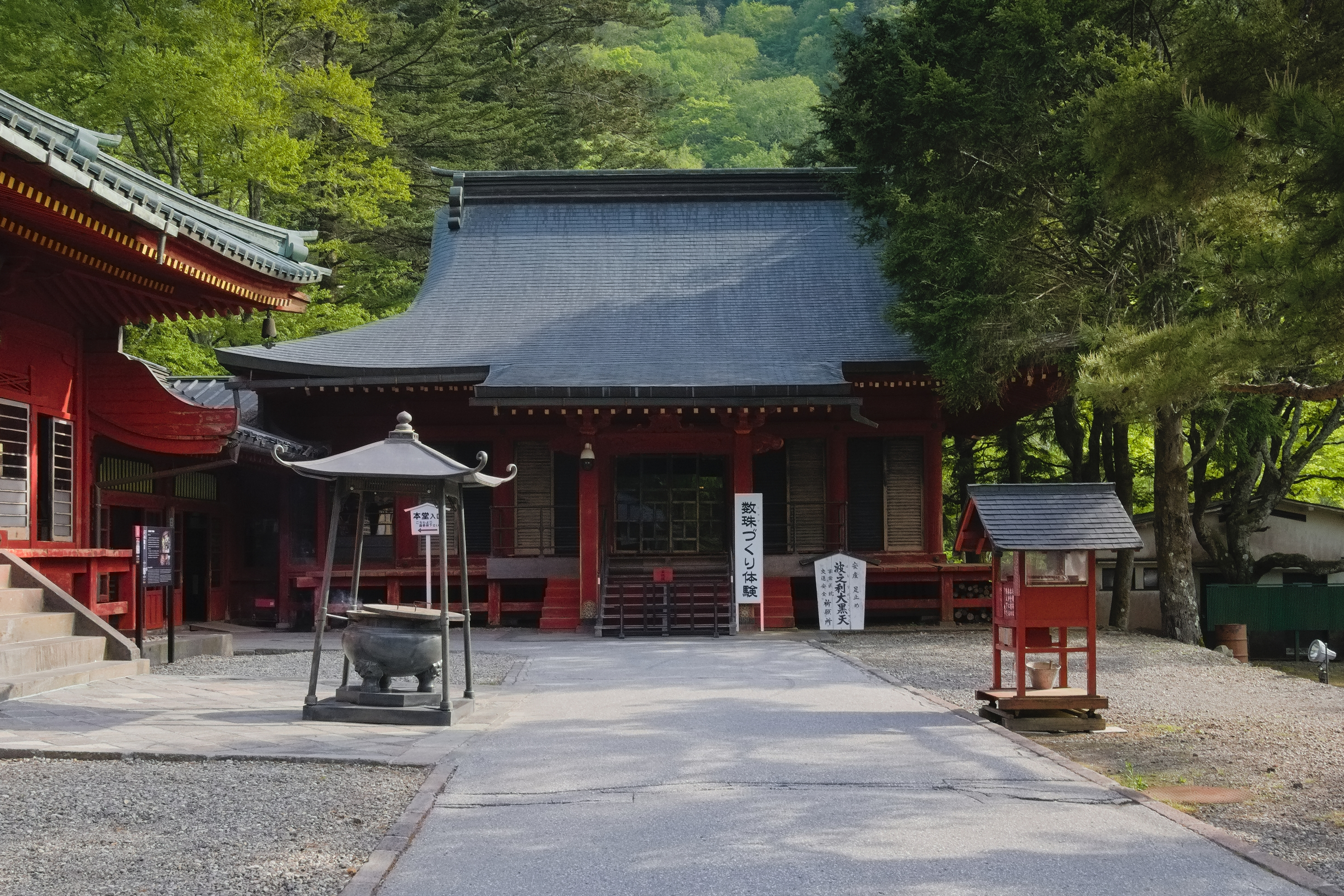
Daikokuten-dō

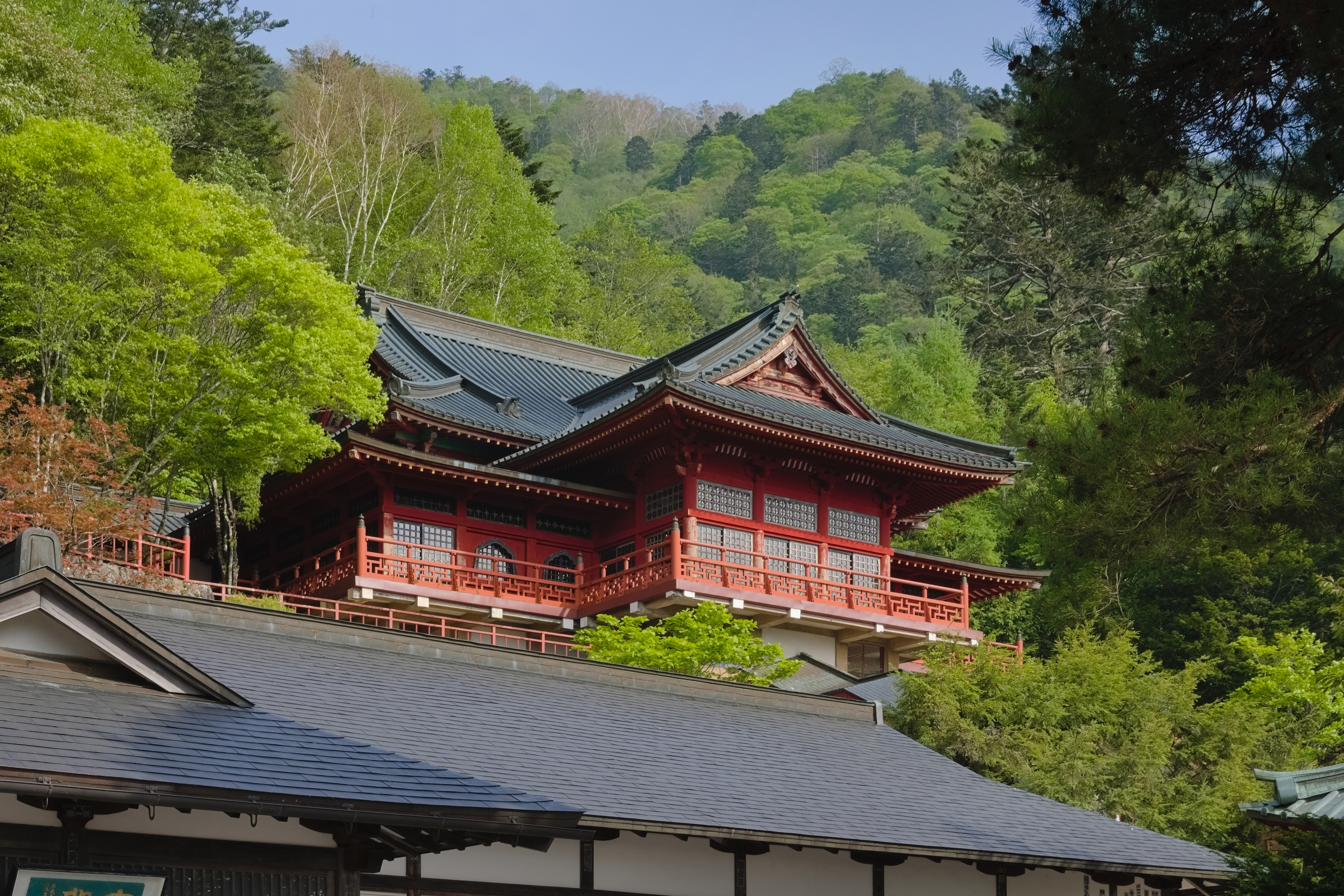
Godai-dō

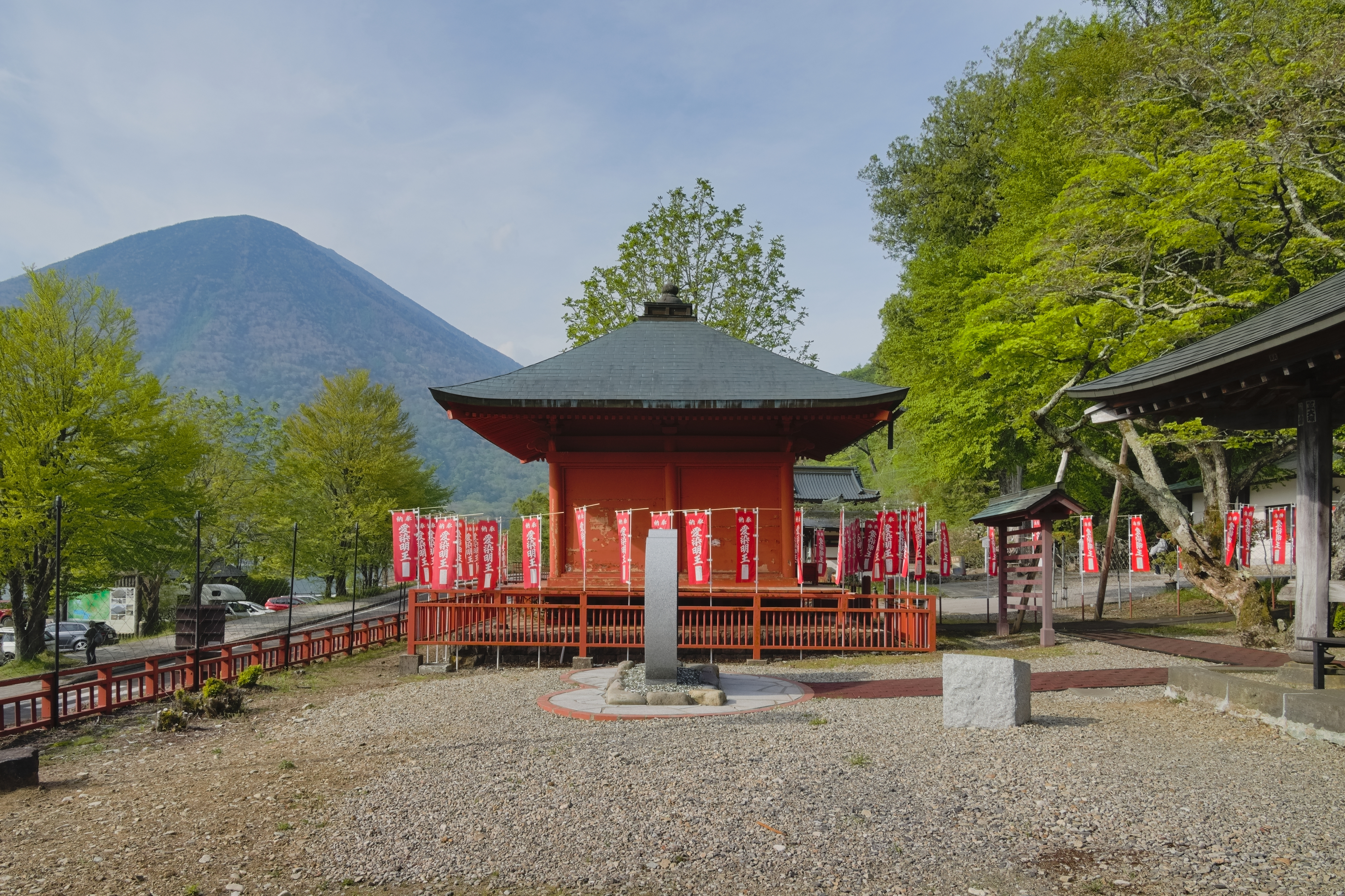
Aizen-dō

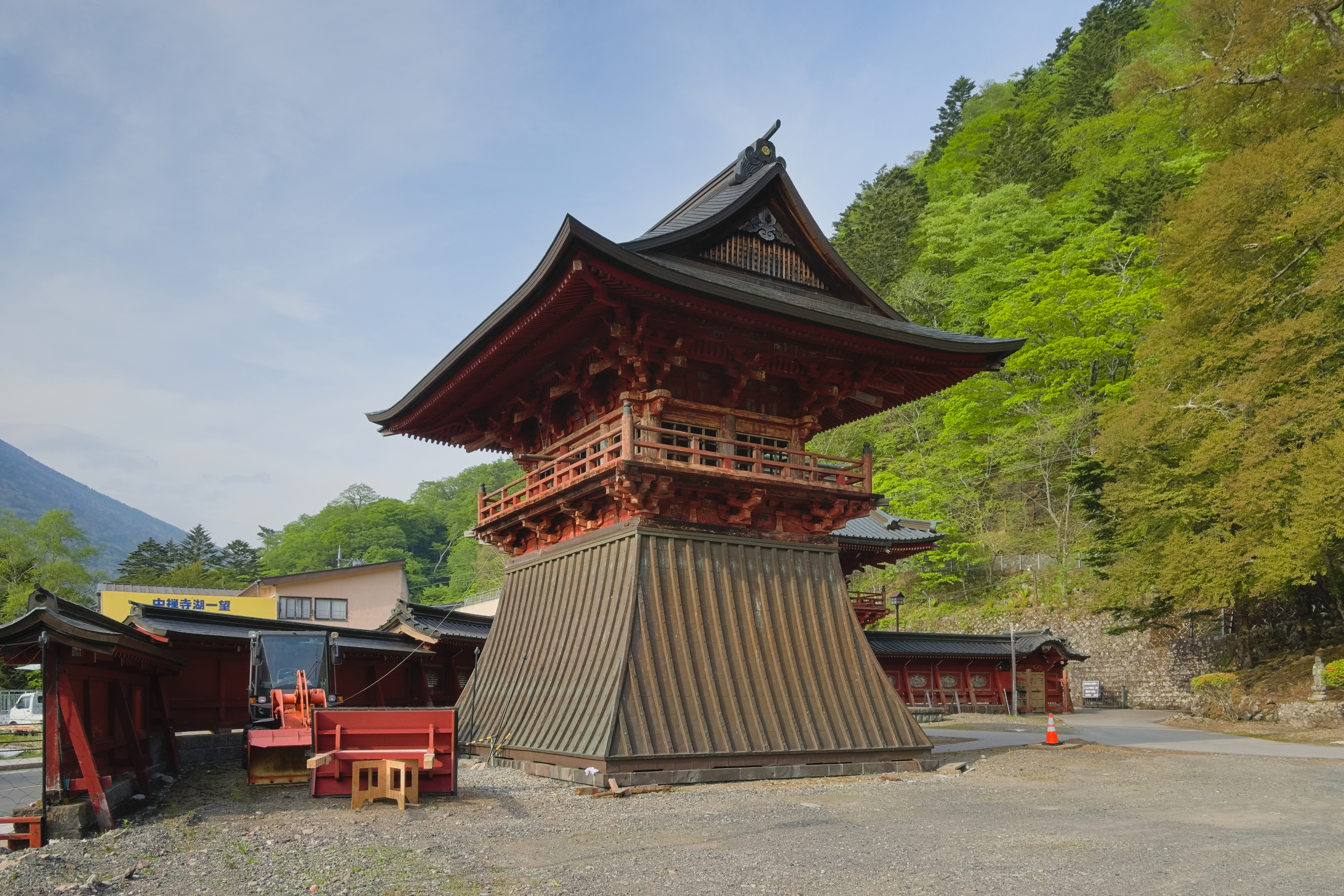
Shōrō

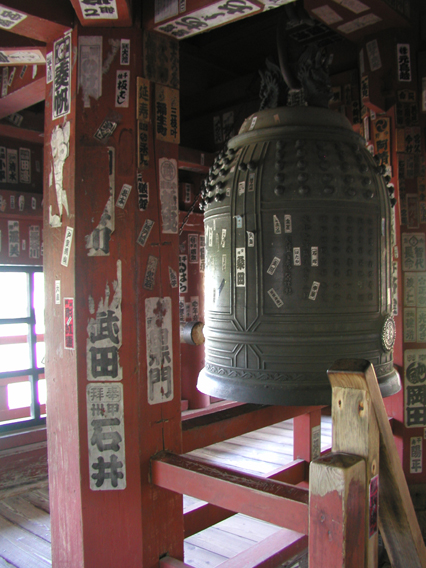
Shōrō

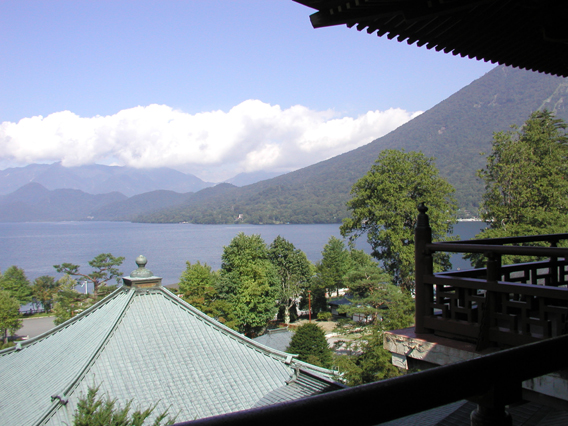
Lake Chuzenji from the temple

== Access ==
The temple is approximately 18 kilometers by car from Tobu Nikko Station.

== Cultural Properties ==
=== Important Cultural Properties ===
- Wooden Standing Senjū Kannon Bosatsu (木造千手観音立像); This 4.8-meter tall statue is commonly known as "Tachiki Kannon". It is said to have been carved using the Ittō Sanrei Bori method, in which the sutra is read three times each time a chisel is inserted. Judging from the style and technique, the actual production date is estimated to be the late Heian period. It is carved from a single piece of Katsura wood, with the 42 hands and other parts made from different materials.
