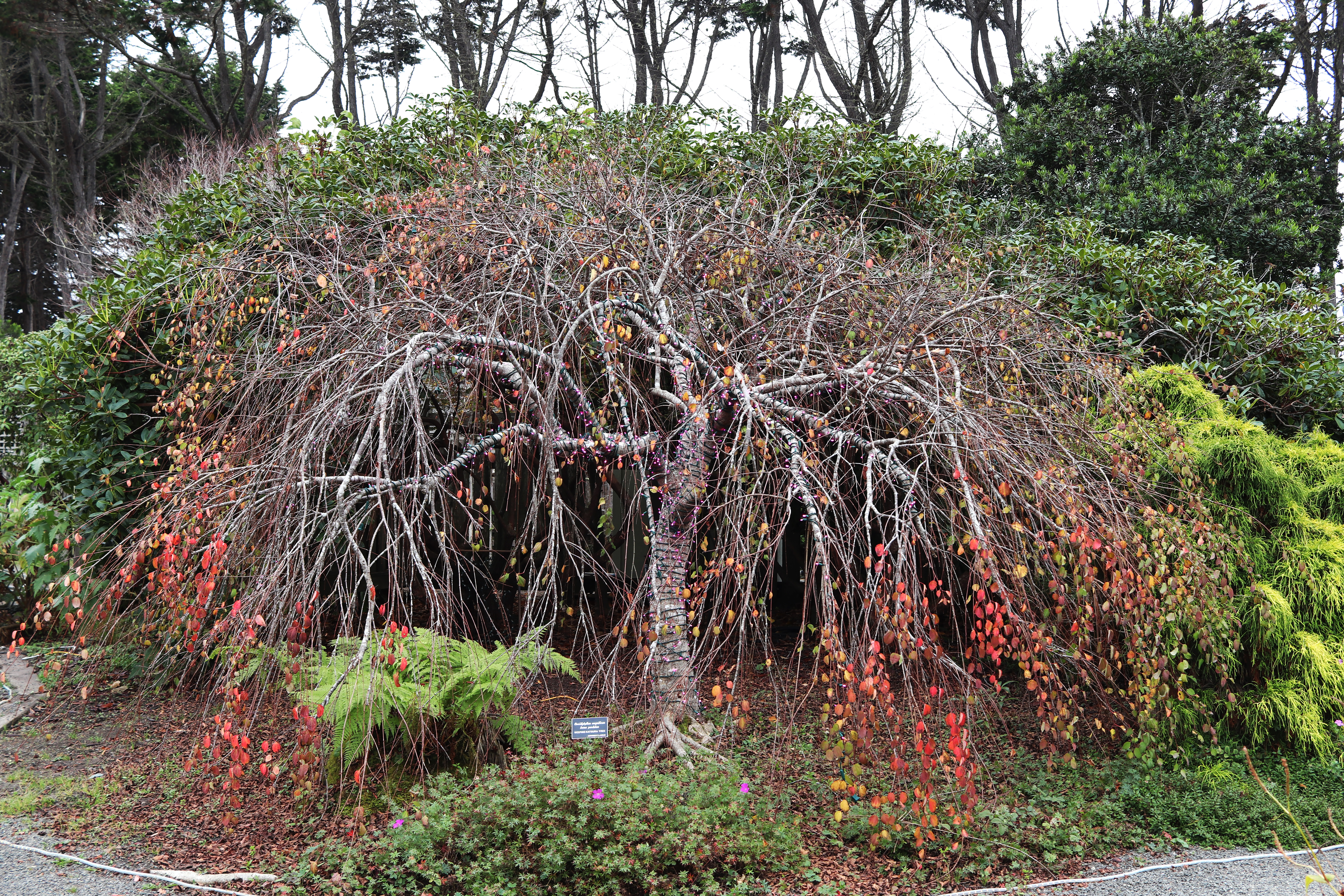
- Cercidiphyllum magnificum f. pendulum

Conservation status
- Least Concern (IUCN 3.1)

Scientific classification
- Kingdom: Plantae
- Clade: Embryophytes
- Clade: Tracheophytes
- Clade: Angiosperms
- Clade: Eudicots
- Order: Saxifragales
- Family: Cercidiphyllaceae
- Genus: Cercidiphyllum
- Species: C. magnificum

Binomial name
- Cercidiphyllum magnificum (Nakai) Nakai

Synonyms
- Cercidiphyllum japonicum var. magnificum Nakai

= Cercidiphyllum magnificum =

Species of flowering tree

Cercidiphyllum magnificum, known as the large-leaf katsura or magnificent katsura tree, is a species of flowering tree in the family Cercidiphyllaceae native to Honshu, Japan. It is sometimes called caramel tree for the light, sweet smell it emits during leaf fall, sometimes compared to cotton candy (candyfloss) or "freshly baked biscuits and bread". It is grown as an ornamental tree for its heart shaped leaves that in autumn turn a mixture of bright yellow, pink and orange-red.

== Description ==
Cercidiphyllum magnificum is a small deciduous tree, growing to no more than 10 m (33 ft) in height and pyramidal to broadly conical in shape. The tree has a smooth bark. The twigs bear leaves that are dimorphic with both short and long shoots. The short shoots bear large cordate (heart-shape) or reniform (kidney shaped) leaves with palmate venation and crenate margins, while the long shoots have leaves that are elliptic to broadly ovate with entire or finely serrate margins. The leaves are up to 8 cm (3.1 in) long and 5.5 cm (2.2 in) broad, and are initially bronze coloured, but in autumn turn a mixture of bright pink, violet and yellow, giving off a scent of burnt sugar when they fall, hence the name "caramel tree".

The species is dioecious, having separate male and female trees, with small inconspicuous flowers appearing early in spring that are wind pollinated. The flowers lack petals, the male being reddish and the female greenish. The female trees produce woody, pod-like fruit in clusters of 2–4, each about 1–2 cm (0.4–0.8 in) long. The pods contain many small flattened seeds that are winged at both ends.

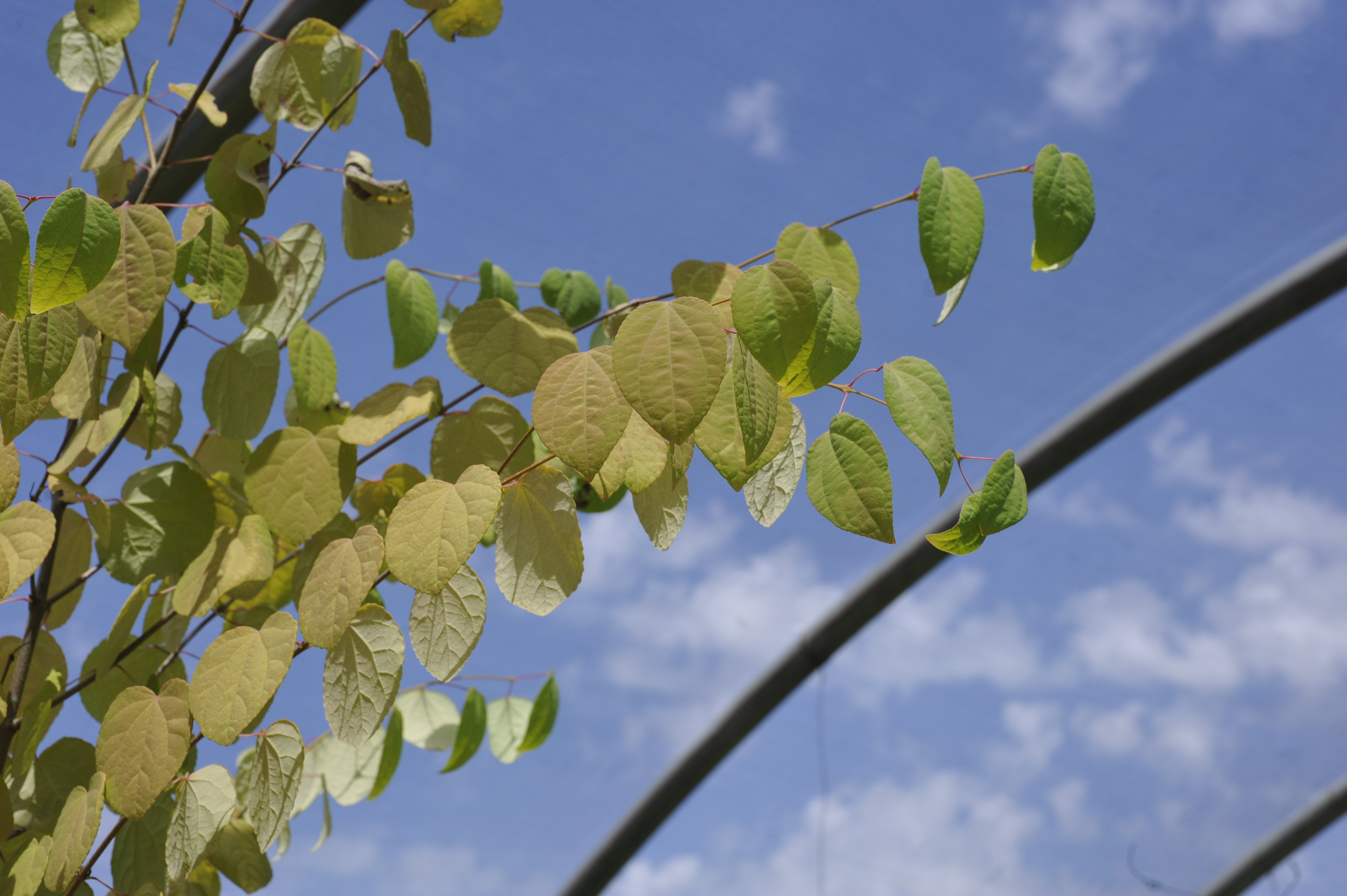
Leaves

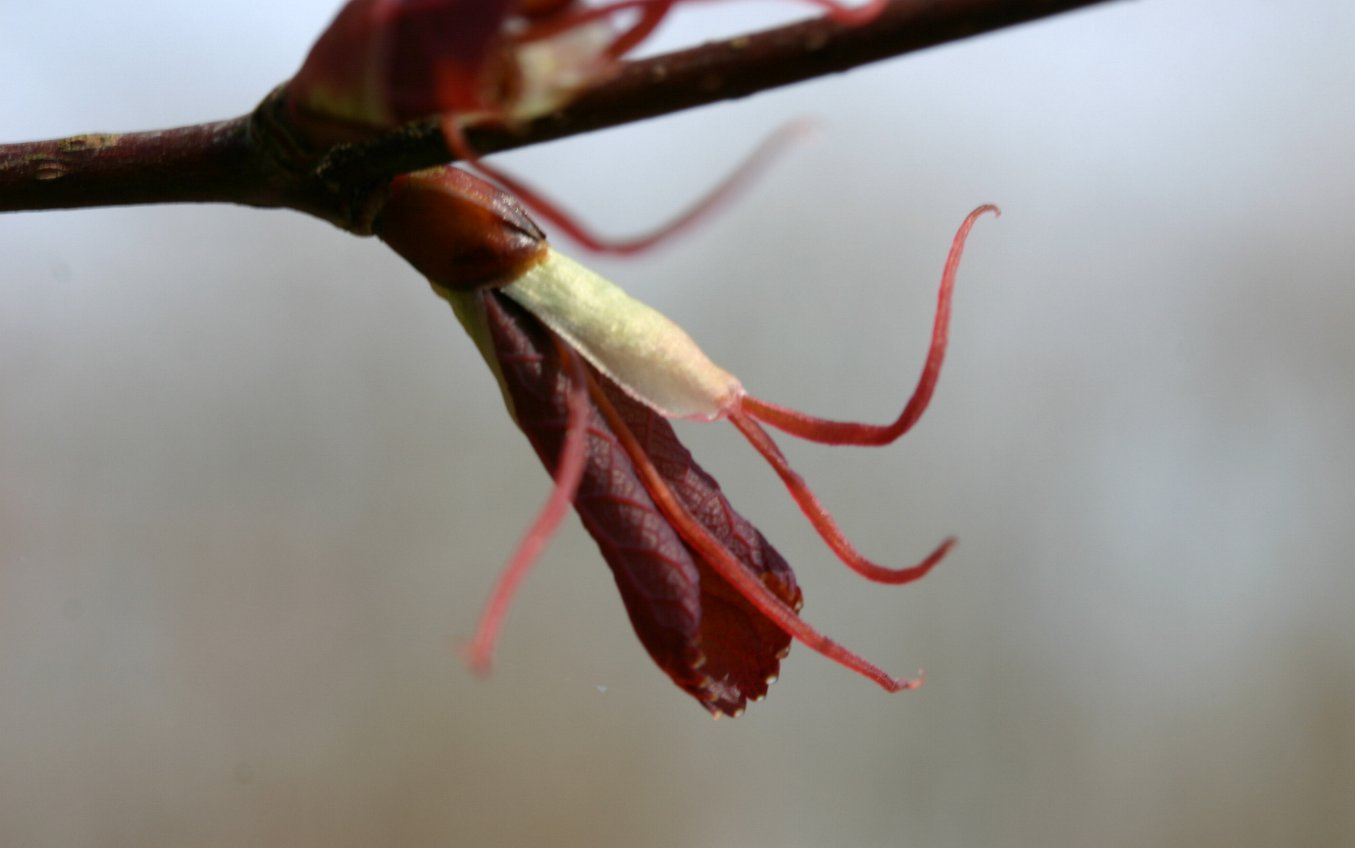
Female flower

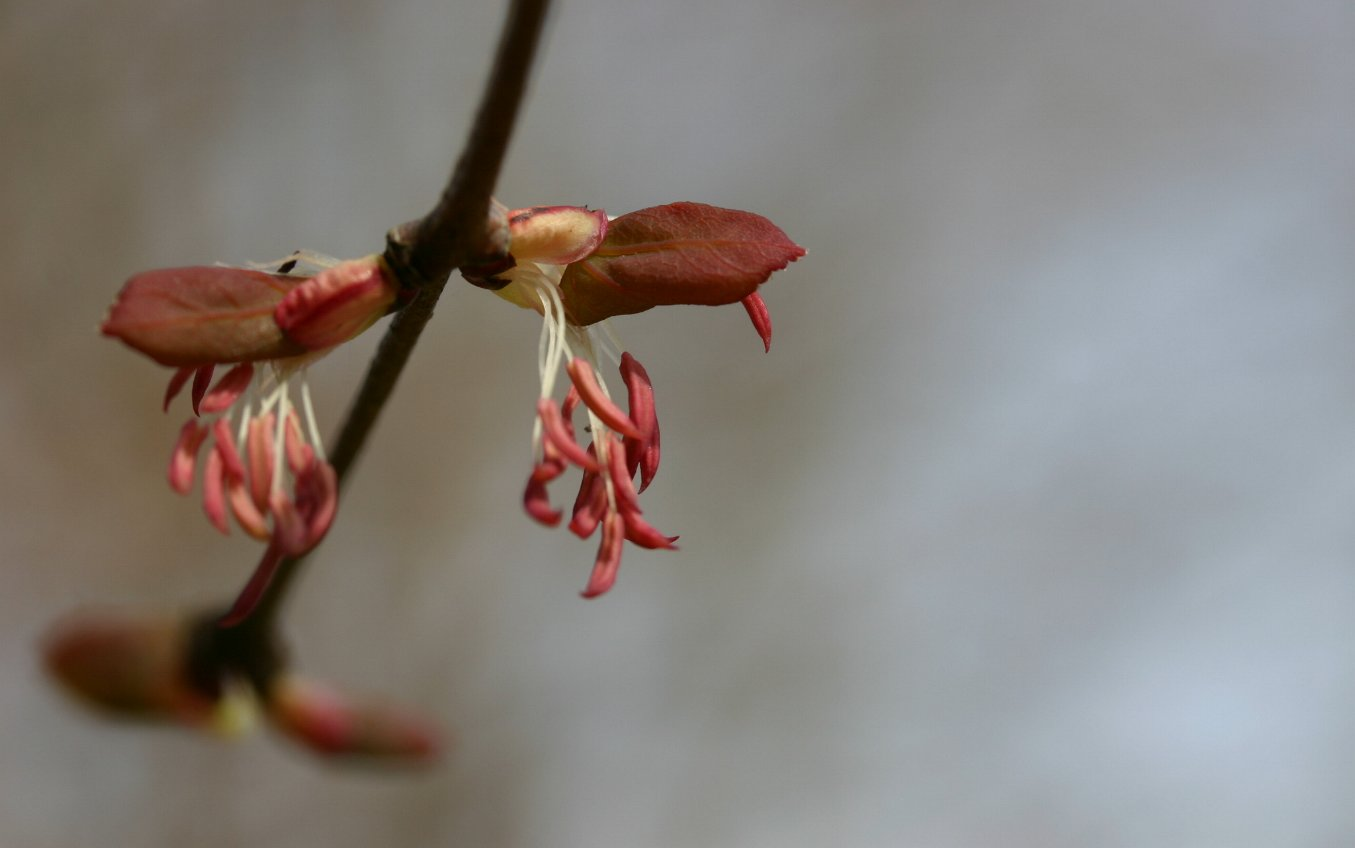
Male flower

It is similar to Cercidiphyllum japonicum, but can be distinguished by a combination of the following characteristics: C. magnificum is a smaller tree that typically has only a single main trunk (vs. large, canopy-forming, with multiple trunks); the leaves are more deeply crenated; the follicles are partially dehiscent, with slightly recurved tips (vs. follicles fully dehiscing and strongly recurving tips); grows at a higher elevation, rarely co-occurring with C. japonicum.

== Taxonomy ==
Cercidiphyllum magnificum is, along with C. japonicum, one of only two members of the genus Cercidiphyllum and family Cercidiphyllaceae. It was first described as a variety, C. japonicum var. magnificum, in 1919 by Japanese botanist Takenoshin Nakai, then separated into a different species the following year in his Catalogus seminum et sporarum Hortus Botanicus Universitatis Imperialis Tokyoensis. The type locality is from Honshu, Japan in the Ashio Mountains (Mount Nikkō-Shirane and Mount Konsei.

== Distribution and habitat ==
Cercidiphyllum magnificum is endemic to the central, forested mountainous areas of Honshu.

== Uses ==
The katsura wood is soft and light and used for cabinetry and paneling.
