= Streptomyces noboritoensis =

Scientific classification
- Domain: Bacteria
- Kingdom: Bacillati
- Phylum: Actinomycetota
- Class: Actinomycetes
- Order: Streptomycetales
- Family: Streptomycetaceae
- Genus: Streptomyces
- Species: S. noboritoensis

Binomial name
- Streptomyces noboritoensis Isono et al. 1957

Type strain
- AS 4.1457, ATCC 25477, BCRC 11553, CBS 887.69, CCRC 11553, CGMCC 4.1457, DSM 40223, ETH 28375, IFO 13065, IMET 43914, IPCR 97, ISP 5223, JCM 4065, JCM 4557, KCC S-0065, KCC S-0557, KCTC 9060, Lanoot R-8701, LMG 19337, NBIMCC 1862, NBRC 13065, NRRL B-12152, NRRL-ISP 5223, ptcc1139, R-8701, RIA 1257, Suzuki 97, VKM Ac-1012

Synonyms
- Streptomyces melanogenes Sugawara and Onuma 1957 (Approved Lists 1980)

Species of bacterium

Streptomyces noboritoensis is a bacterium species from the genus of Streptomyces which has been isolated from soil in Japan. Streptomyces noboritoensis produces elasnin, noboritomycin A, noboritomycin B, blastomycin and hygromycin. Streptomyces noboritoensis also produces melanomycin, 1-hydroxysulffurmycin B and 5-hydroxymaltol.

== See also ==
- List of Streptomyces species
