= Penicillium echinulatum =

Scientific classification
- Domain: Eukaryota
- Kingdom: Fungi
- Division: Ascomycota
- Class: Eurotiomycetes
- Order: Eurotiales
- Family: Aspergillaceae
- Genus: Penicillium
- Species: P. echinulatum

Binomial name
- Penicillium echinulatum Raper & Thom ex Fassat., Acta Universitatis Carolinae Biologica 5-6 (1974 [publ. 1976]) page 326

Varieties
- Penicillium echinulatum var. discolor Frisvad; Penicillium echinulatum var. echinulatum

Synonyms
- Penicillium cyclopium var. echinulatum Raper & Thom; Penicillium palitans var. echinoconidium S. Abe (1956)

Species of fungus

Penicillium echinulatum is a mold species in the genus Penicillium. It is a source of cellulase.

5-Hydroxymaltol and mycophenolic acid are substances that can be found in P. echinulatum.
