= Gallium maltolate =

- Gallium maltolate

Names
- IUPAC name Tris(3-hydroxy-2-methyl-4H-pyran-4-one)gallium

Identifiers
CAS Number	108560-70-9
3D model (JSmol)	Interactive image
ChemSpider	8022053
DrugBank	DB05420
PubChem CID	9846339
UNII	17LEI49C2G
- InChI: InChI=1S/3C6H6O3.Ga/c3*1-4-6(8)5(7)2-3-9-4;/h3*2-3,8H,1H3;/q;;;+3/p-3 Key: ASYYOZSDALANRF-UHFFFAOYSA-K
- SMILES: o1c(c(c(=O)cc1)O[Ga](Oc1c(occc1=O)C)Oc1c(occc1=O)C)C

Properties
Chemical formula	Ga(C_{6}H_{5}O_{3})_{3}
Molar mass	445.03 g/mol
Appearance	White to pale beige crystalline solid or powder
Density	1.56 g/cm^{3}, solid
Melting point	220 °C (decomposes)
Solubility in water	24(2) mM; 10.7(9) mg/mL (25 °C)

Structure
Crystal structure	Orthorhombic; space group Pbca
Coordination geometry	Distorted octahedral
- Except where otherwise noted, data are given for materials in their standard state (at 25 °C [77 °F], 100 kPa). verify (what is ?) Infobox references

Gallium maltolate is a coordination complex consisting of a trivalent gallium cation coordinated to three maltolate ligands. The compound is a potential therapeutic agent for cancer, infectious disease, and inflammatory disease. A cosmetic skin cream containing gallium maltolate is marketed under the name Gallixa. It is a colorless solid with significant solubility in both water and lipids (octanol-water partition coefficient = 0.41).

== Mechanism of action ==
Gallium maltolate delivers gallium with higher oral bioavailability than that of gallium salts such as gallium nitrate and gallium trichloride. In vitro studies have found gallium to be antiproliferative due primarily to its ability to mimic ferric iron (Fe^{3+}). Ferric iron is essential for DNA synthesis, as it is present in the active site of the enzyme ribonucleotide reductase, which catalyzes the conversion of ribonucleotides to the deoxyribonucleotides required for DNA. Gallium is taken up by the rapidly proliferating cells, but it is not functional for DNA synthesis, so the cells cannot reproduce and they ultimately die by apoptosis. Normally reproducing cells take up little gallium (as is known from gallium scans), and gallium is not incorporated into hemoglobin, accounting for the relatively low toxicity of gallium.

== Research ==
Gallium (III) ion shows anti-inflammatory activity in animal models of inflammatory disease. Orally administered gallium maltolate has demonstrated efficacy against two types of induced inflammatory arthritis in rats. Experimental evidence suggests that the anti-inflammatory activity of gallium may be due, at least in part, to the down-regulation of pro-inflammatory T-cells and inhibition of inflammatory cytokine secretion by macrophages. Because many iron compounds are pro-inflammatory, the ability of gallium to act as a non-functional iron mimic may contribute to its anti-inflammatory activity.

Gallium maltolate has also been proposed for the treatment of primary liver cancer (hepatocellular carcinoma; HCC). In vitro experiments demonstrated efficacy against HCC cell lines, and encouraging clinical results have been reported.

Gallium compounds are active against infection-related biofilms, particularly those caused by Pseudomonas aeruginosa. In related research, locally administered gallium maltolate has shown efficacy against P. aeruginosa in a mouse burn/infection model. The potential of this approach may be somewhat limited by the relatively rapid appearance of gallium-resistant isolates.

Oral gallium maltolate has been investigated as a treatment for Rhodococcus equi foal pneumonia, a common and often fatal disease of newborn horses. R. equi can also infect humans with AIDS or who are otherwise immunocompromized.

Topically applied gallium maltolate has been studied for use in neuropathic pain (severe postherpetic neuralgia and trigeminal neuralgia). It has been hypothesized that any effect on pain may be related to gallium's anti-inflammatory mechanisms, and possibly from its interactions with certain matrix metalloproteinases and substance P, whose activities are zinc-mediated and which have been implicated in the etiology of pain.
