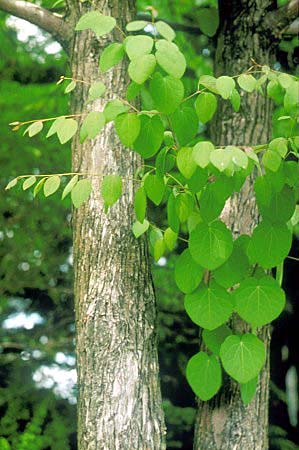
- Katsura (C. japonicum) trunk and foliage

Scientific classification
- Kingdom: Plantae
- Clade: Tracheophytes
- Clade: Angiosperms
- Clade: Eudicots
- Order: Saxifragales
- Family: Cercidiphyllaceae; Engl.
- Genus: Cercidiphyllum; Siebold & Zucc.

Species
- C. japonicum Siebold & Zucc. ex J.J.Hoffm. & J.H.Schult.bis; C. magnificum (Nakai) Nakai
- The range of Cercidiphyllum.

= Cercidiphyllum =

Cercidiphyllum Temporal range: Maastrichtian–Recent

Genus of trees

Cercidiphyllum is a genus containing two species of plants, both commonly called katsura. They are the sole members of the monotypic family Cercidiphyllaceae. The genus is native to Japan and China and unrelated to Cercis (redbuds).

== Description ==
The type species, Cercidiphyllum japonicum, can reach 45 m (148 ft) in height, and is one of the largest hardwoods in Asia. The other species, Cercidiphyllum magnificum, is much smaller, rarely reaching over 10 m (33 ft) in height. Cercidiphyllum produces spurs along its twigs. These are short stems with closely spaced leaves. The foliage is dimorphic. According to a recent description "short shoots bear broadly cordate or reniform, palmately veined leaves with crenate margins; long shoots bear elliptic to broadly ovate leaves with entire or finely serrate margins." Leaf size varies from 3 to 8 cm long and 3–5.5 cm broad. The genus is dioecious, having separate male and female trees. The small inconspicuous flowers are produced in early spring and wind-pollinated; the fruit is a cluster of 2-4 small pods, each pod 1–2 cm long with numerous small, flattened and winged seeds. The fruits mature in autumn and release their seeds in autumn through winter.

The leaves have a strong, sweet smell in the fall, described as caramel or Madeira cake-like. The smell comes from a combination of maltol and a sugary compound in the leaves and is strongest when they are brown. In German, Cercidiphyllum trees are named after their scent; Kuchenbaum or Lebkuchenbaum ("pie tree" or "gingerbread tree").

== Nomenclature ==
Katsura (カツラ) is the Japanese name for the tree. The scientific name Cercidiphyllum refers to the close resemblance of the leaves to those of Cercis (redbuds); these two unrelated genera can however be distinguished easily as redbud leaves are alternate, not opposite.

== Species ==
The two species are:

- Cercidiphyllum japonicum. Throughout the range of the genus. Typically a multi-stemmed tree to 40–45 m tall in the wild, though typically smaller in cultivation. Bark rough, furrowed. Leaves smaller, not over 4.5 cm long and 3.2 cm broad; stipules falling soon after leafing out in spring. Seed winged only at lower end. Plants from China were at one time separated as C. japonicum var. sinense, but no consistent difference between Japanese and Chinese origins has been found.
- Cercidiphyllum magnificum. Endemic to central Honshū, where it grows at higher altitudes than C. japonicum. A small tree, not more than 10 m tall. Bark smooth. Leaves larger, up to 8 cm long and 5.5 cm broad; stipules persistent. Seed winged at both ends.

== Cultivation ==
Katsura is grown as an ornamental tree for its delicate heart-shaped leaves and bright autumn colour, a mix of bright yellow, pink and orange-red. Where conditions are suitable, it is fast-growing, but it is very sensitive to drought and needs deep, permanently moist soil. Under drought conditions, the species will abscise its leaves; however refoliation may occur once water is made available. Of particular interest is the scent produced by the leaves in the autumn, resembling burnt brown sugar or cotton candy. Trees in cultivation, like those in natural environments, tend to sucker from the base when young and become multi-stemmed at maturity; pruning to maintain a single stem is not advised.

Within Cercidiphyllum japonicum, several cultivars with pendulous branches are grown for their unique weeping habit. Two general types exist. Those with a strong central leader, or excurrent growth, are all one clone originating in Morioka City, Japan. This cultivar is known as 'Morioka Weeping' and can reach over 25 m (82 ft) in height. The other type fails to form a central leader and is rounded in habit. There are several clones of this, including 'Amazing Grace' and 'Tidal Wave'.

Both the species C. japonicum and the weeping form C. japonicum f. pendulum have gained the Royal Horticultural Society's Award of Garden Merit.

== Uses ==
Katsura wood is often used to make gobans, i.e. boards for the game Go.

== Fossil record ==
The genus is known from fossils at the end of the Cretaceous (Maastrichtian) of North America, and the Cenozoic of North America, Europe and Asia.

Fossil species include:

Cercidiphyllum ellipticum

Cercidiphyllum genetrix

Cercidiphyllum obtritum - Eocene Okanogan Highlands, Ypresian, North America

== Gallery ==
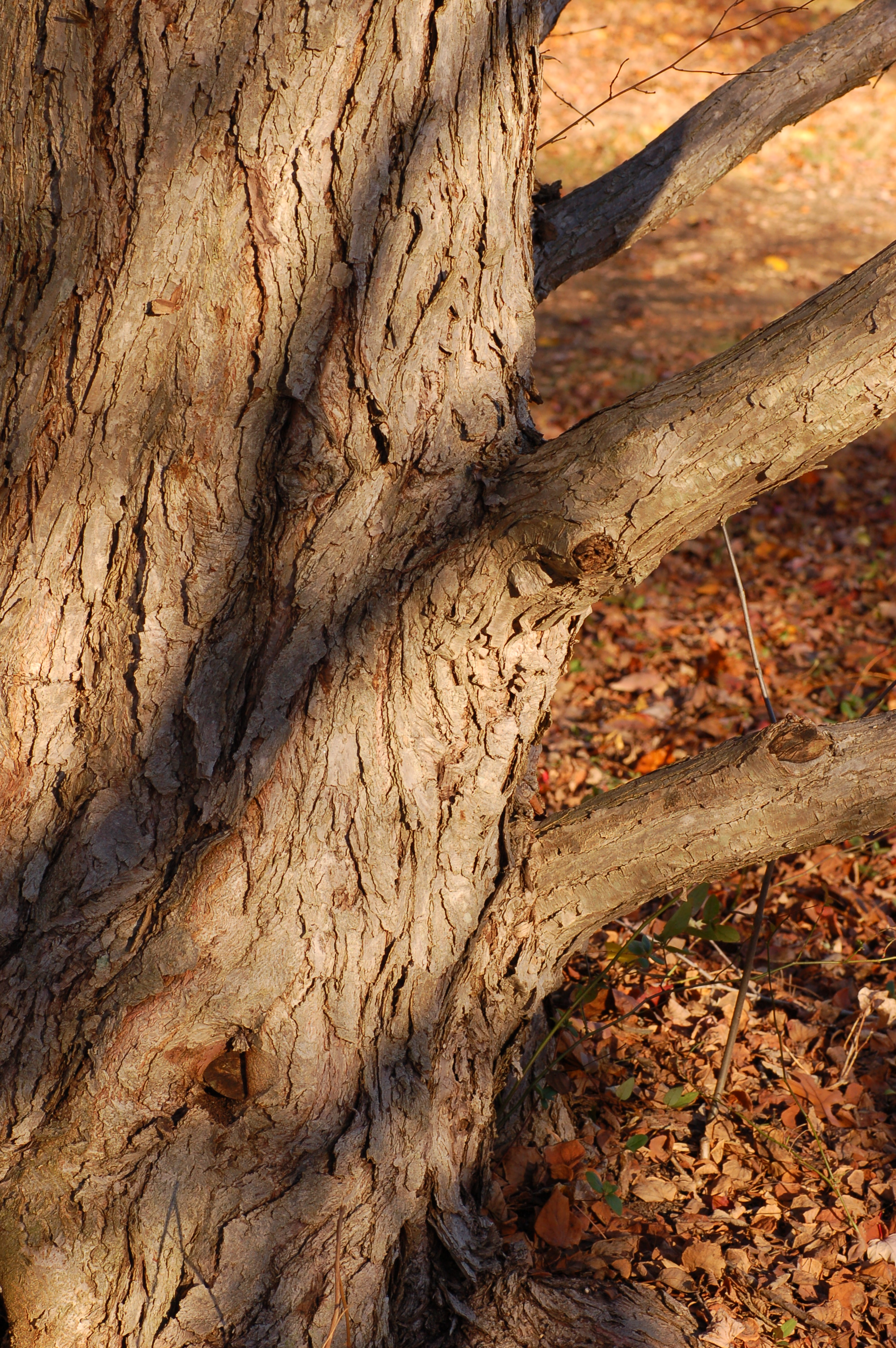
Cercidiphyllum japonicum Trunk bark

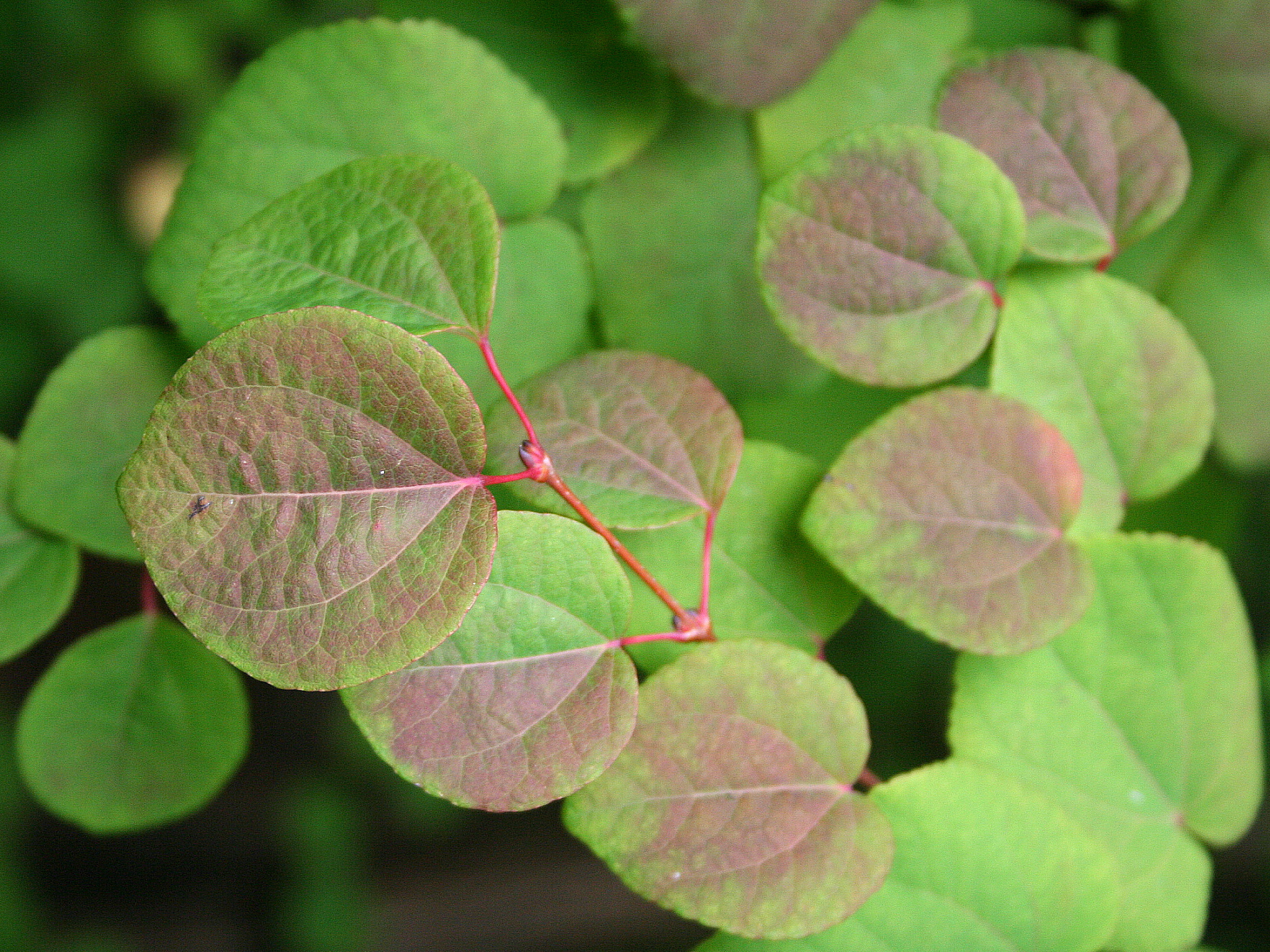
Cercidiphyllum japonicum leaves

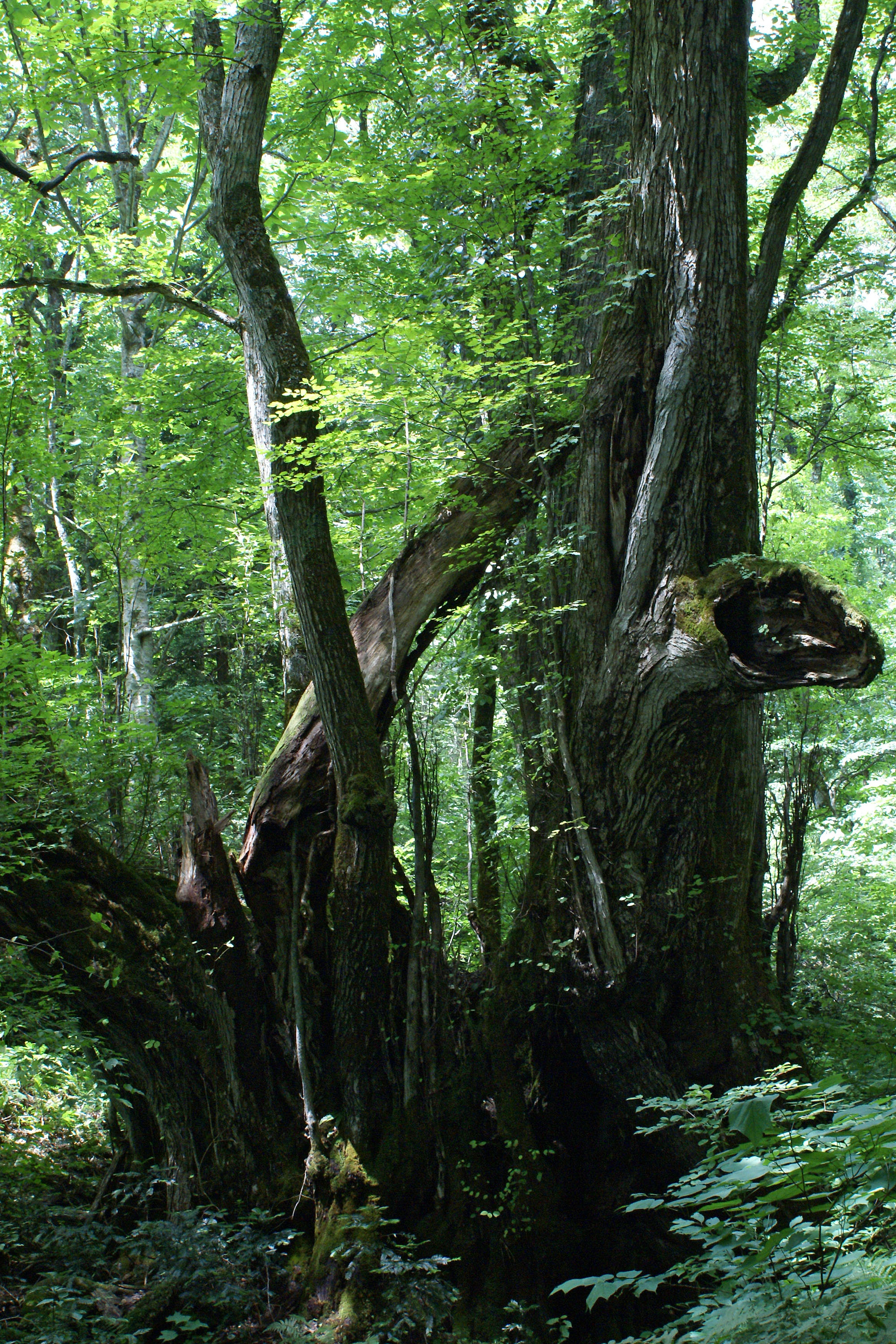
"great Katsura of Wachi"

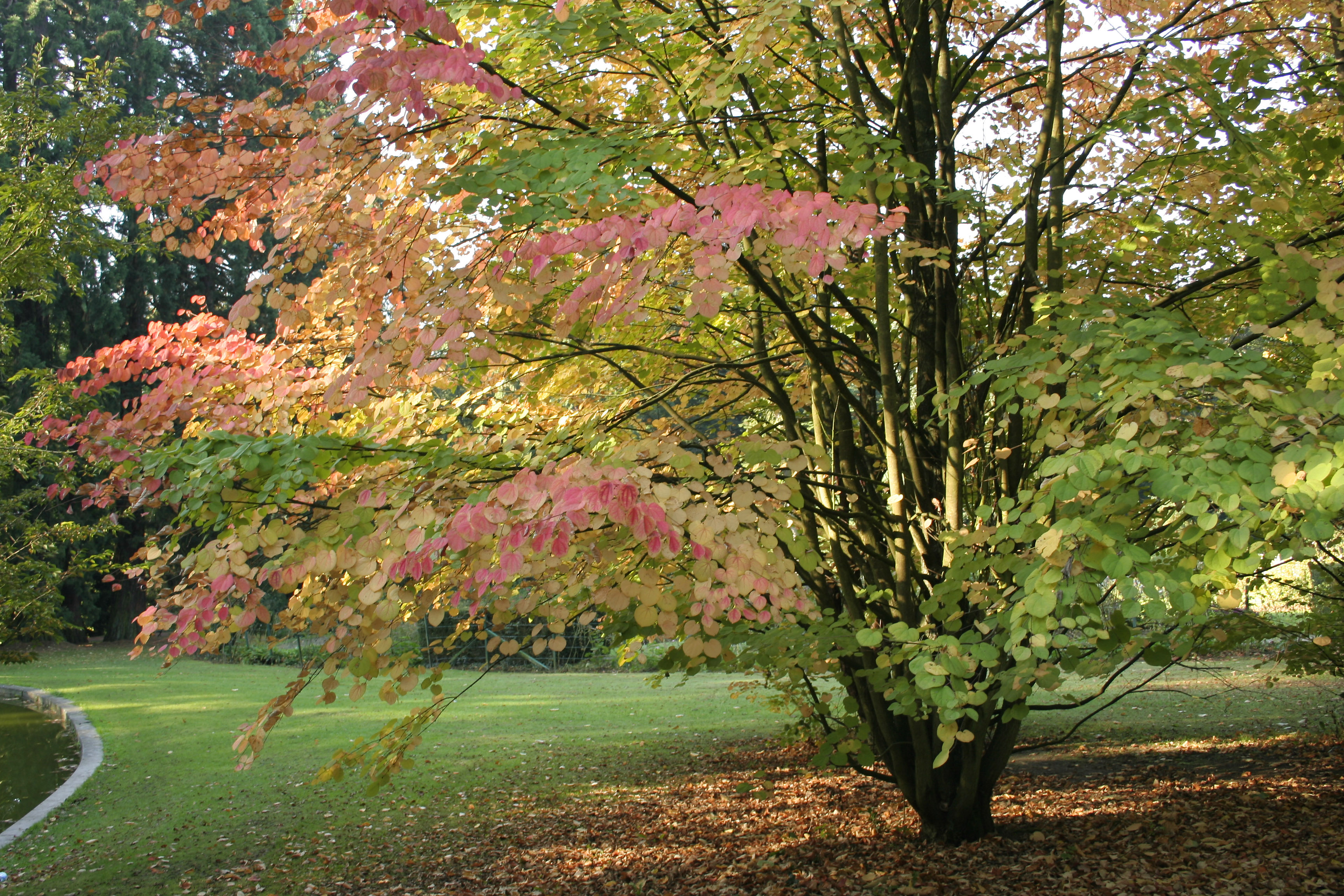
Cercidiphyllum japonicum in the autumn

== Sources ==
- Andrews, S. (1998). "Tree of the Year: Cercidiphyllum". International Dendrology Society Yearbook. 1997: 17–46.
- Dosmann, M. S. (1999). "Katsura: A review of Cercidiphyllum in cultivation and in the wild". The New Plantsman. 6: 52–62.
- Dosmann, M. S.; Andrews, S. K.; Del Tredici, P.; Li, J. (2003). "Classification and nomenclature of weeping katsuras". The Plantsman. New Series. 2: 21–27.
- Dosmann, M. S.; Iles, J. K.; Graves, W.R. (1999). "Drought avoidance in katsura by drought-induced leaf abscission and rapid refoliation". HortScience. 34 (5): 871–874. doi:10.21273/HORTSCI.34.5.871.
