= Ethyl maltol =

Names
- Preferred IUPAC name 2-Ethyl-3-hydroxy-4H-pyran-4-one
- Other names: 2-Ethyl-3-hydroxy-4-pyranone; 2-Ethyl pyromeconic acid; 2-Ethyl-3-hydroxy-4-pyrone

Identifiers
CAS Number	4940-11-8
3D model (JSmol)	Interactive image
ChEBI	CHEBI:169105
ChEMBL	ChEMBL121557
ChemSpider	19804
ECHA InfoCard	100.023.256
EC Number	225-582-5
KEGG	C20362
PubChem CID	21059
RTECS number	UQ0840000
UNII	L6Q8K29L05
CompTox Dashboard (EPA)	DTXSID5041516
- InChI: InChI=1S/C7H8O3/c1-2-6-7(9)5(8)3-4-10-6/h3-4,9H,2H2,1H3 Key: YIKYNHJUKRTCJL-UHFFFAOYSA-N; InChI=1/C7H8O3/c1-2-6-7(9)5(8)3-4-10-6/h3-4,9H,2H2,1H3 Key: YIKYNHJUKRTCJL-UHFFFAOYAY
- SMILES: CCC1=C(C(=O)C=CO1)O

Properties
Chemical formula	C_{7}H_{8}O_{3}
Molar mass	140.138 g·mol^{−1}
Appearance	White crystalline powder
Melting point	85 to 95 °C (185 to 203 °F; 358 to 368 K)
Boiling point	161 °C (322 °F; 434 K)

Hazards
- GHS labelling
Pictograms	(GHS07: Exclamation mark)
Signal word	Warning
Hazard statements	H302
Precautionary statements	P264, P270, P301+P312, P330, P501
- Except where otherwise noted, data are given for materials in their standard state (at 25 °C [77 °F], 100 kPa). verify (what is ?) Infobox references

Ethyl maltol is an organic compound that is a common flavourant in some confectioneries. It is related to the more common flavorant maltol by replacement of the methyl group by an ethyl group. It is a white solid with a sweet smell that can be described as caramelized sugar or as caramelized fruit. Ethyl maltol is often used in perfumery to create gourmand scents. Its aroma is described as "sweet, caramellic, jammy, strawberry, cotton candy, berry, sugar". It has been evaluated by JECFA and EFSA. It is widely used in foods, e-liquid, perfumes, cosmetics, and pharmaceuticals. Ethyl maltol was first used in Mugler's Angel perfume in 1992.

The conjugate base derived from ethylmaltol, again like maltol, has a high affinity for iron, forming a red coordination complex. In such compounds, the heterocycle is a bidentate ligand.

Original patent:
