= Fujiwara no Akihira =

Japanese nobleman and kanshi poet (c. 989–1066)

Fujiwara no Akihira (藤原 明衡; c. 989 – November 14, 1066) was a Japanese nobleman and kanshi poet of the Heian period.

== Life ==
Fujiwara no Akihira was the second child of Fujiwara no Atsunobu. His mother was either a daughter of 良峰英材 or possibly a daughter of Tachibana no Tsunehira. He was likely born around 989.

Akihira studied under his father from an early age. In Kankō 1 (1004 in the Gregorian calendar), he enrolled in the Monjō-in, an educational institution for the study of Chinese literature and classical learning.

Among his children were Fujiwara no Atsumoto and Fujiwara no Atsumitsu.

According to the Chokusen Sakusha Burui (勅撰作者部類), he died on the 18th day of the tenth month of Jiryaku 2 (November 14, 1066). In his article on Akihira for the Nihon Koten Bungaku Daijiten, Shōsuke Ōsone suggests that he may have been 78 years old at the time of his death when calculated using Japanese age reckoning.

== Poetry ==
Akihira was known as a poet of kanshi, Chinese-style poetry composed by Japanese scholars during the Heian period. Kanshi formed an important part of court literary culture and was often produced by aristocrats educated in Chinese literature and Confucian classics.
