= Fujiwara no Atsumitsu =

Japanese writer (1063–1144)

Fujiwara no Atsumitsu (藤原 敦光; 1063–1144) was a Japanese nobleman and writer of both kanshi and waka poetry who lived during the Heian period.

== Biography ==
The poet Fujiwara no Atsumitsu was born in 1063. His father was Fujiwara no Akihira and his mother (whose name is not known) was a daughter of Taira no Sanshige (平実重).

Atsutane lost his father when he was four by traditional Japanese reckoning (i.e., in his fourth year), and he was raise by his elder brother. During the reign of Emperor Shirakawa, he became a student Chinese literature (文章生 monjōshō) at the Imperial University, and in his 28th year he was selected as one of the monjō tokugō-shō (文章得業生), a prestigious honour granted to two students at a time.

Atsumitsu died on the 28th day of the tenth month of the first year of Ten'yō (24 November 1144 by the Julian calendar), when he was 82 by traditional Japanese reckoning.
