= 5-Hydroxymaltol =

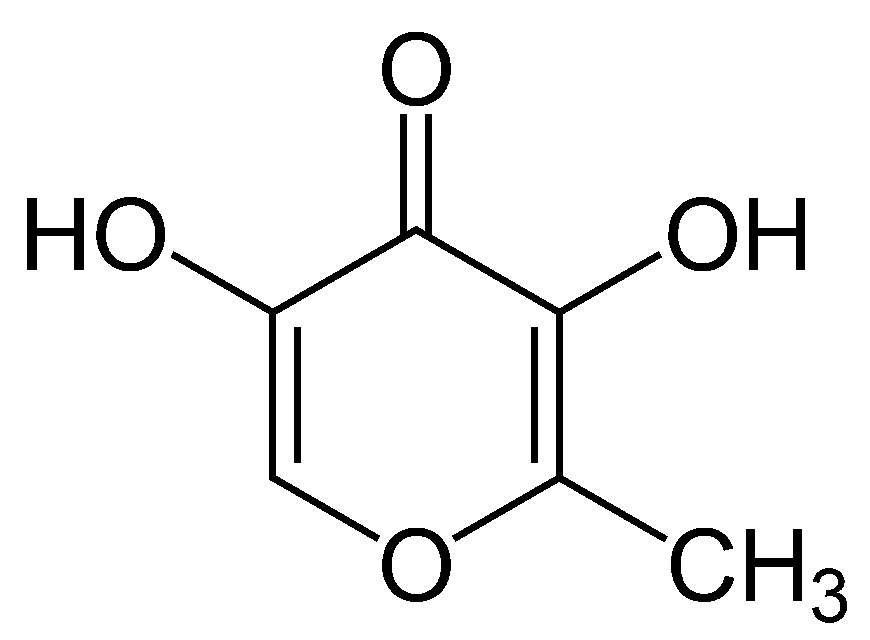

Names
- Preferred IUPAC name 3,5-Dihydroxy-2-methyl-4H-pyran-4-one
- Other names 3,5-Dihydroxy-2-methylpyran-4-one

Identifiers
CAS Number	1073-96-7
3D model (JSmol)	Interactive image
ChemSpider	63795
ECHA InfoCard	100.258.796
PubChem CID	70627
UNII	DBQ2Q3Z4FR
CompTox Dashboard (EPA)	DTXSID50148002
- InChI: InChI=1S/C6H6O4/c1-3-5(8)6(9)4(7)2-10-3/h2,7-8H,1H3 Key: SSSNQLHKSUJJTE-UHFFFAOYSA-N
- SMILES: Cc1occ(O)c(=O)c1O

Properties
Chemical formula	C_{6}H_{6}O_{4}
Molar mass	142.110 g·mol^{−1}
- Except where otherwise noted, data are given for materials in their standard state (at 25 °C [77 °F], 100 kPa). verify (what is ?) Infobox references

5-Hydroxymaltol, a derivative of maltol, is a substance that can be found in Penicillium echinulatum. It is also found in toasted oak and also in honeys from blue gum (Eucalyptus leucoxylon) and yellow box (Eucalyptus melliodora).
