= Atsunobu Tomomatsu =

Japanese scholar

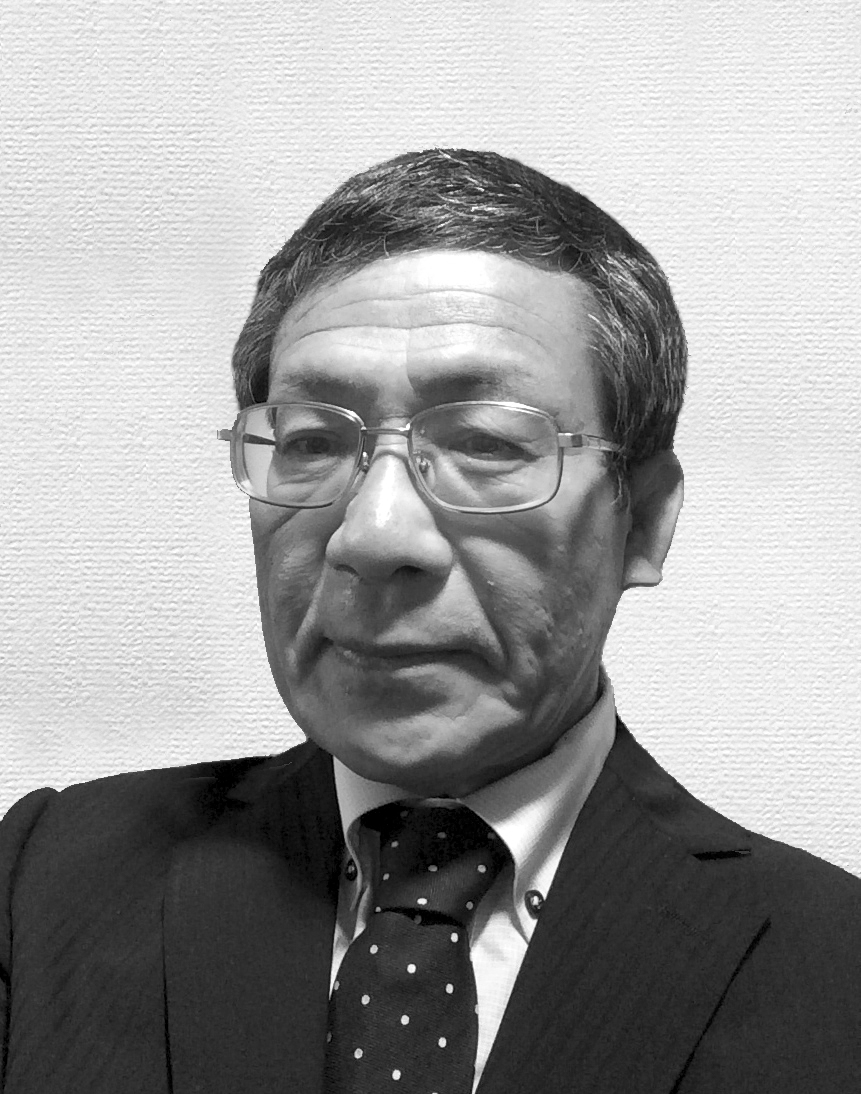

Atsunobu Tomomatsu (友松 篤信, Tomomatsu Atsunobu) is a Japanese scholar in international relations. His specializations are studies of international cooperation, technical cooperation and international exchange. He is professor emeritus at Utsunomiya University, Japan.

== Biography ==
Tomomatsu was born in Nagoya, Aichi prefecture, Japan in 1948. He received his B.S. degree in biological chemistry from Saitama University in 1973 and his M.S. and Ph.D. degrees, both in plant biochemistry, from Nagoya University in 1975 and 1980, respectively.

Tomomatsu started his professional career at Japan International Cooperation Agency (JICA) in 1980 and worked as an international development specialist in Indonesia (Bogor Agricultural University) 1980–83, the Kingdom of Thailand (Kasetsart University) in 1985, USA (International Food Policy Research Institute) 1986–88, and as a member of the delegation of the Government of Japan to General Assembly of the United Nations (UN) and International Monetary Fund (IMF) in 1987.

Tomomatsu changed his place of work from an international aid agency to a university in 1991 and devoted himself to research and education as an associate professor and a professor since 1994 at Utsunomiya University, Japan. He also taught at the University of Tokyo 1997-2007 and took part in the administration of Utsunomiya University as a special advisor to the president 2005–08. He established Halal Research Utsunomiya, a non-profit organization to propagate an idea of halal to Japanese society to provide Muslims, both locals and tourists, with more comfortable conditions. After Tomomatsu retired from Utsunomiya University in 2014, he established F & T Japan ltd. for halal consultancy and business management. He received a Ph.D. in Agriculture in 1980 from Nagoya University.

Tomomatsu studied plant biochemistry under the supervision of Prof. Ikuzo Uritani and Associate Prof. Tadashi Asahi at the graduate school of Nagoya University. After he had finished academic career, he worked as an international development specialist of JICA in Southeast Asia, South Asia and Africa where he participated in formation, implementation and evaluation of Japan's Official Development Assistance (ODA) projects.

He made a significant contribution to the development of 12 countries in the third world in such various fields as agricultural development, social development, and education and research cooperation where he attempted to introduce empirical and experimental study to university education in Indonesia and Thailand, promoted exports of cash crops from Bhutan to India, helped establishing research institutes of basic medical science in Thailand and Kenya, and participated in food policy research in USA and Indonesia.

Based on his wide range of job experience, Tomomatsu found a philosophy of site-oriented action, which presents the principle of development work as “in the beginning there are problems, not a specialization.” At Utsunomiya University he educated action-oriented approaches, in international development cooperation, such as development facilitation and development intelligence, and proposed global career education for developing globally active manpower.

Tomomatsu is the Chairperson of Halal Research Utsunomiya since 2013, KDDI Foundation Prize in 2015, and a member of the board of trustees of Food-Kansei Communications since 2015, and an Associate International Expert at the Secretariat of Association of Southeast Asian Nations (ASEAN) since 2017, as well as being a lecturer at the Open University of Japan since 2004.

== Books ==
International Cooperation

- International Reputation on Japan’s ODA: Japan, USA, UK, German, and France in News Reports in Developing Countries, coauthor, in Japanese, Fukumura Syuppan, 2011
- Guidance to International Cooperation, edit. & coauthor, in Japanese, Kokon Shoin, 2010
- University Textbook of International Cooperation, edit. & coauthor, in Japanese, Kokon Shoin, 2006
- Handbook of International Development, edit. & coauthor, in Japanese, Akashi Syoten, 2005

Agricultural Development

- Plant Biochemistry and Molecular Biology of Stress: Tropical Root Crops, coauthor, in Chinese, China Ihei Publishing Co., China, 2004
- Plant Biochemistry and Molecular Biology of Stress: Tropical Root Crops, coauthor, in Japanese, Gakkai Syuppan Center, 2001
- Biotechnology for Asian Agriculture, coauthor, Asian & Pacific Development Centre, 1991

Development Education

- How to Learn “Foreign Countries”, coauthor, in Japanese, Laputa, 2017
- Thirty Eight Lecturers on Views of the World, coauthor, in Japanese, Shimotsuke Shinbunsha, 2014
- Global Career Education: Rearing Global Manpower, edit. & coauthor, in Japanese, Nakanishiya Syuppan, 2012
- Looking the World from Tochigi, edit. & coauthor, in Japanese, Shimotsuke Shinbun, 2005

Religion and Culture

- Zazen: The way to Awakening, coauthor, iUniverse, Inc., USA, 2011
- Traditional Dietary Culture in Southeast Asia, transl. of Akira Matsuyama's book, Columbia University Press, USA and Kegan Paul International, London, 2003
- Do Zazen This Way, coauthor, in Japanese, Jiyuu-Sha, 1998

== Research Papers ==
=== International Cooperation ===
- “The reputation of Japan’s ODA: A Comparative Study on Newspaper Reports of Vietnam, Pakistan and Kenya”, in Japanese, The Infosocionomics Soc. J., 5:2-15, 2010
- “News Analysis Using On-Web Articles concerning Japanese ODA: A Case Study on Vietnam”, in Japanese, The Infosocionomics Soc. J., 3:89-105, 2009
- “Development Partnership between Japan and Local NGOs: A Case Study in Indonesia”, Ritsumeikan International Affairs, 2:41-49, 2004
- "Japanese Technical Cooperation in Malaysia: Analysis of Project Finding Capability, the Roles of Experts and Malaysian Mass Media", J. Internat. Develop. Studies, 6:63-73,1998
- “Issues in Planning and Implementation of Japan’s Project-Type Technical Cooperation: Extracts from an Ex-Post Evaluation Study on Mahaweli Agricultural Development Project in Sri Lanka”, in Japanese, J. Agric. Develop. Studies, 7:31-42, 1997
- “Characteristics of Research Activities and Some Issues on Research Cooperation in Developing Countries”, in Japanese, Intern. Coop. Studies, 1:12-23, 1985

=== Agricultural Development ===
- “Chemical Constituents of Sugar-Containing Sap and Brown Sugar from Palm in Indonesia”, Jpn. J. of Tropical Agric., 40:175〜181, 1996
- “Development in a Tropical Postharvest System: An Approach to Environmental Problems”, in Japanese, Tropical Agric., 36:327-333, 1992
- “Studies on Sustainable Agriculture in the Tropics: Presence of “Black Hole” in Reducing Sustainability of Commercial Farms”, in Japanese, Develop. Studies, 37:38-44, 1992
- “Studies on Post Harvest Losses: Rice Grain Losses in the Postharvest System in Java, Indonesia”, in Japanese, Develop. Studies, 2:26-37, 1992
- “Studies on Post Harvest Losses: Factors Affecting Rice Grain Losses in Java, Indonesia”, in Japanese, Develop. Studies, 2:10-37, 1992
- “Studies on Post Harvest Losses: Rice Grain Losses in Java, Indonesia” Develop. Studies, in Japanese, 2:1-8, 1992
- “Chemical and Microbiological Aspects of Dadih in Indonesia”, Jpn. J. of Dairy Products and Food Science, 32:A7〜A14, 1986
- "The analytical study on "Kecap"-an indonesian soy sauce", Jpn. J. of Food Sci. & Tech., 32:67-73, 1985
- “Traditional Milk Products Made from Buffalo Milk by Use of Higher Plants as Coagulants in Indonesia”, Jpn. J. of Dairy Products and Food Science, 32:A103〜A110, 1985
- “Ragi and Its Utilization for the Manufacture of Fermented Foods in Indonesia”, in Japanese, Nippon Shokuhin Kogyo Gakkai, 29:685-692, 1983

=== Plant biochemistry ===
- “An Enzyme in Mung Bean Leaves That Damages Cell Organelles Which Leads to Loss of Their Matrix Enzymes”, Plant & Cell Physiol. 21:689〜698, 1980
- “Non-synchronous Increases in Activities of Peroxisomal enzymes in Etiolated Mung Bean Seedling leaves after illumination”, Plant & Cell Physiol., 19:183〜188, 1978
- “Purification and Properties of Two Enzymes Hydrolyzing Synthetic Substrates, N-α-Benzoyl-D,L-arginine p-Nitroanilide, from Pea Seeds”, Agric. Biol. Chem., 42:315〜322, 1978
