= Isomaltol =

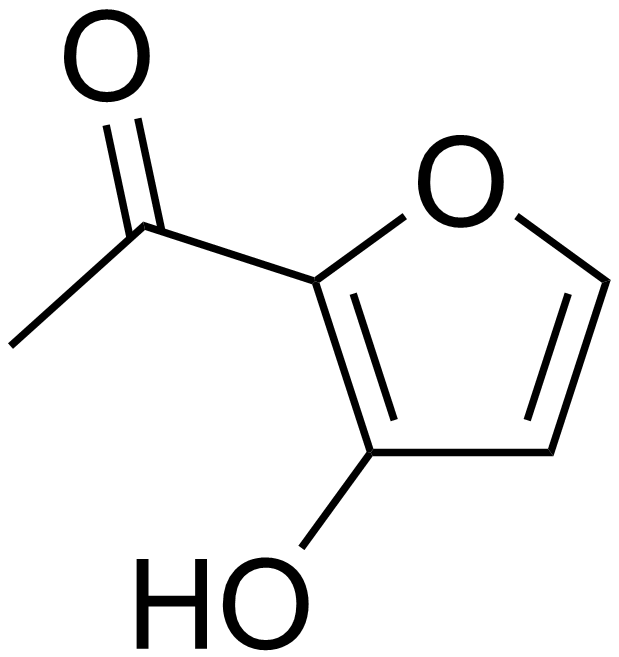

Names
- Preferred IUPAC name 1-(3-Hydroxyfuran-2-yl)ethan-1-one

Identifiers
CAS Number	3420-59-5
3D model (JSmol)	Interactive image
ChemSpider	17845
PubChem CID	18898
UNII	76NST80C38
CompTox Dashboard (EPA)	DTXSID10187790
- InChI: InChI=1S/C6H6O3/c1-4(7)6-5(8)2-3-9-6/h2-3,8H,1H3 Key: HPIGCVXMBGOWTF-UHFFFAOYSA-N; InChI=1/C6H6O3/c1-4(7)6-5(8)2-3-9-6/h2-3,8H,1H3 Key: HPIGCVXMBGOWTF-UHFFFAOYAW
- SMILES: O=C(c1occc1O)C

Properties
Chemical formula	C_{6}H_{6}O_{3}
Molar mass	126.11
Melting point	98 to 103 °C (208 to 217 °F; 371 to 376 K)
Solubility in water	Insoluble
- Except where otherwise noted, data are given for materials in their standard state (at 25 °C [77 °F], 100 kPa). verify (what is ?) Infobox references

Isomaltol is a natural furan obtained by the enzymatic degradation of starch. It is also a flavor component in bread crust, produced by thermal degradation (caramelization) of sugars. Isomaltol is obtained after the Maillard reaction from an amino acid and a reducing sugar

== See also ==
- Maltol
