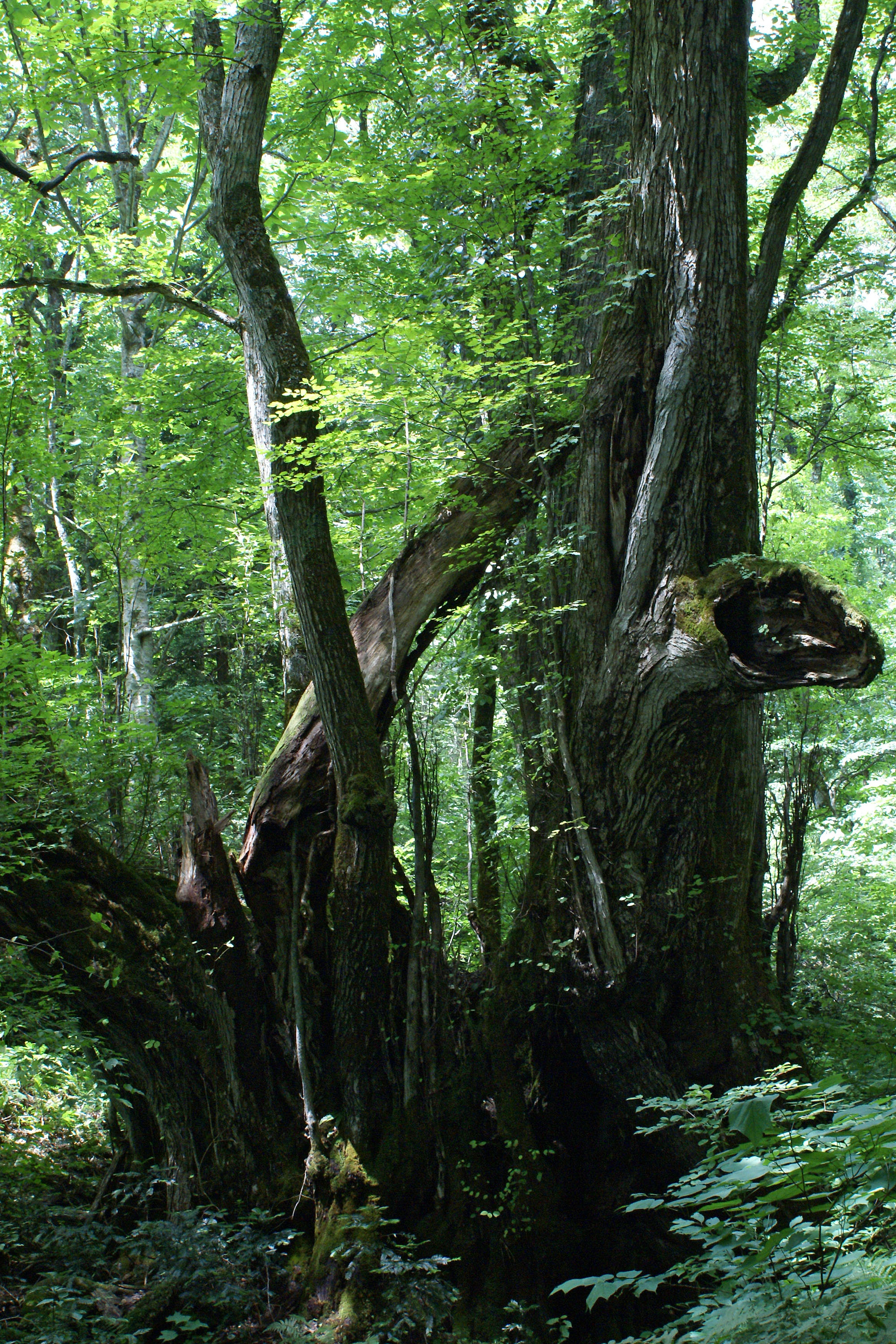
- The "Great Katsura of Wachi", Torokawataira, Kami, Hyogo Prefecture, Japan

Conservation status
- Least Concern (IUCN 3.1)

Scientific classification
- Kingdom: Plantae
- Clade: Embryophytes
- Clade: Tracheophytes
- Clade: Angiosperms
- Clade: Eudicots
- Order: Saxifragales
- Family: Cercidiphyllaceae
- Genus: Cercidiphyllum
- Species: C. japonicum

Binomial name
- Cercidiphyllum japonicum Siebold & Zucc.

= Cercidiphyllum japonicum =

Species of tree

Cercidiphyllum japonicum, known as the Katsura (from its Japanese name カツラ, 桂), is a species of flowering tree in the family Cercidiphyllaceae native to China and Japan. It is sometimes called caramel tree for the light caramel smell it emits during leaf fall. It is also sometimes called candyfloss tree because of the scent.

== Description ==
The tree is deciduous and grows to 10–45 meters tall, with a trunk diameter of up to 2 meters (rarely more).

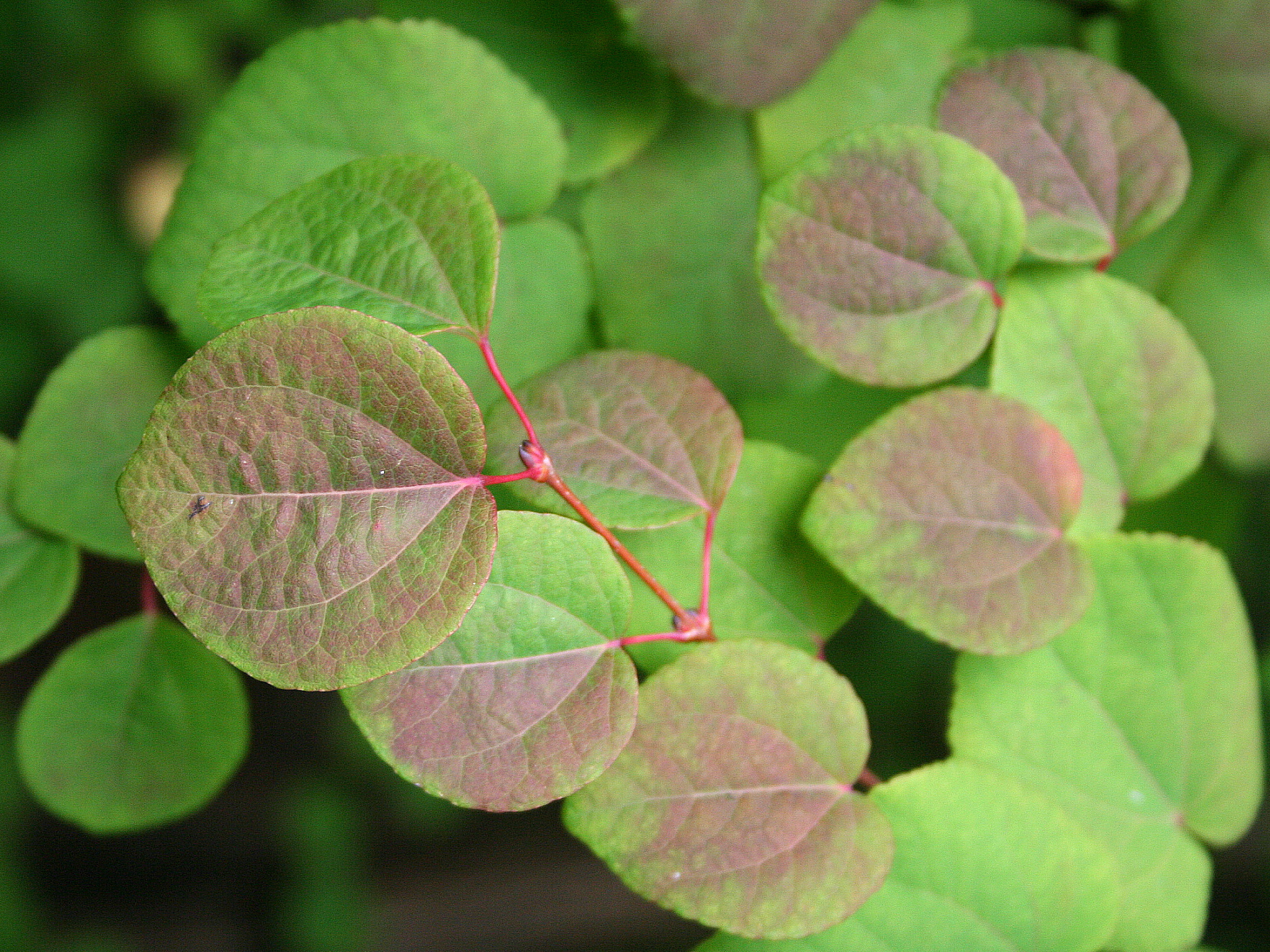
Closeup of leaves, showing seasonal coloration

The shoots are dimorphic, with long shoots forming the structure of the branches and short shoots being born from their second year onward. The leaves are produced in opposite pairs on long shoots and singly on short shoots; they have a 1.4–4.7 cm petiole, and are rounded with a heart-shaped base and a crenate margin. Leaves on short shoots are larger, 3.7–9 cm long and 5–8.3 cm broad, and those on long shoots smaller, being 3.2–4.5 cm long and 1.9–3.2 cm broad. The leaves turn a variety of pinks and yellows in autumn and sometimes have a distinctive caramel scent when in fresh autumn colors. The flowers are inconspicuous and produced in early spring among the opening leaves, with male and female flowers on separate plants (dioecious). The fruit is a cluster of two to four follicles 1–1.8 cm long and 2–3 mm wide with each follicle containing several winged seeds.

== Status ==
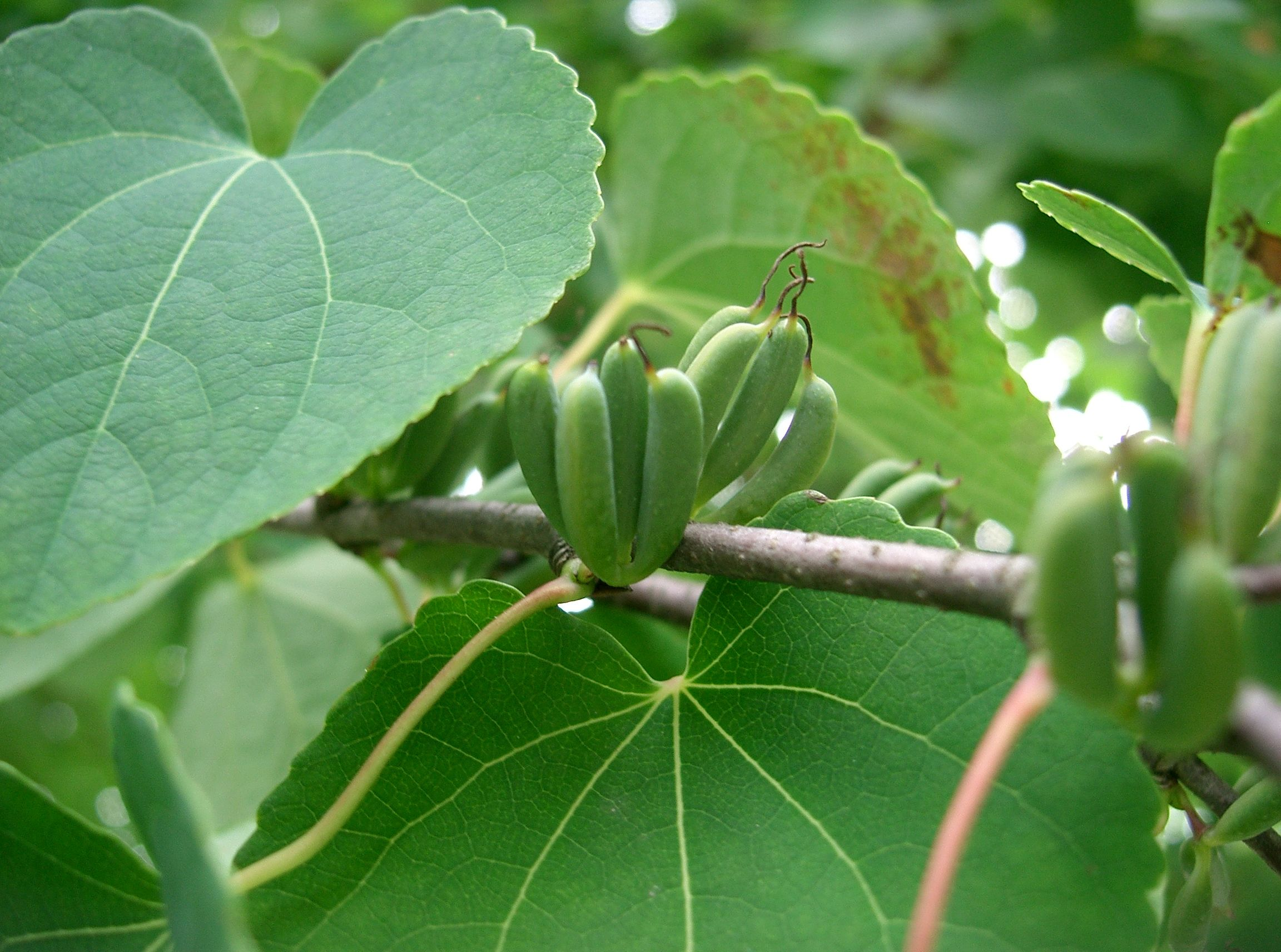
A Cercidiphyllum japonicum branch with fruit.

The species is listed as endangered in China, but overall when Japanese populations are included C. japonicum is classified as being lower risk. The Chinese populations were sometimes distinguished in the past as Cercidiphyllum japonicum var. sinense Rehder & E.H.Wilson, but this is now generally regarded as not distinct from the species.

== Cultivation ==
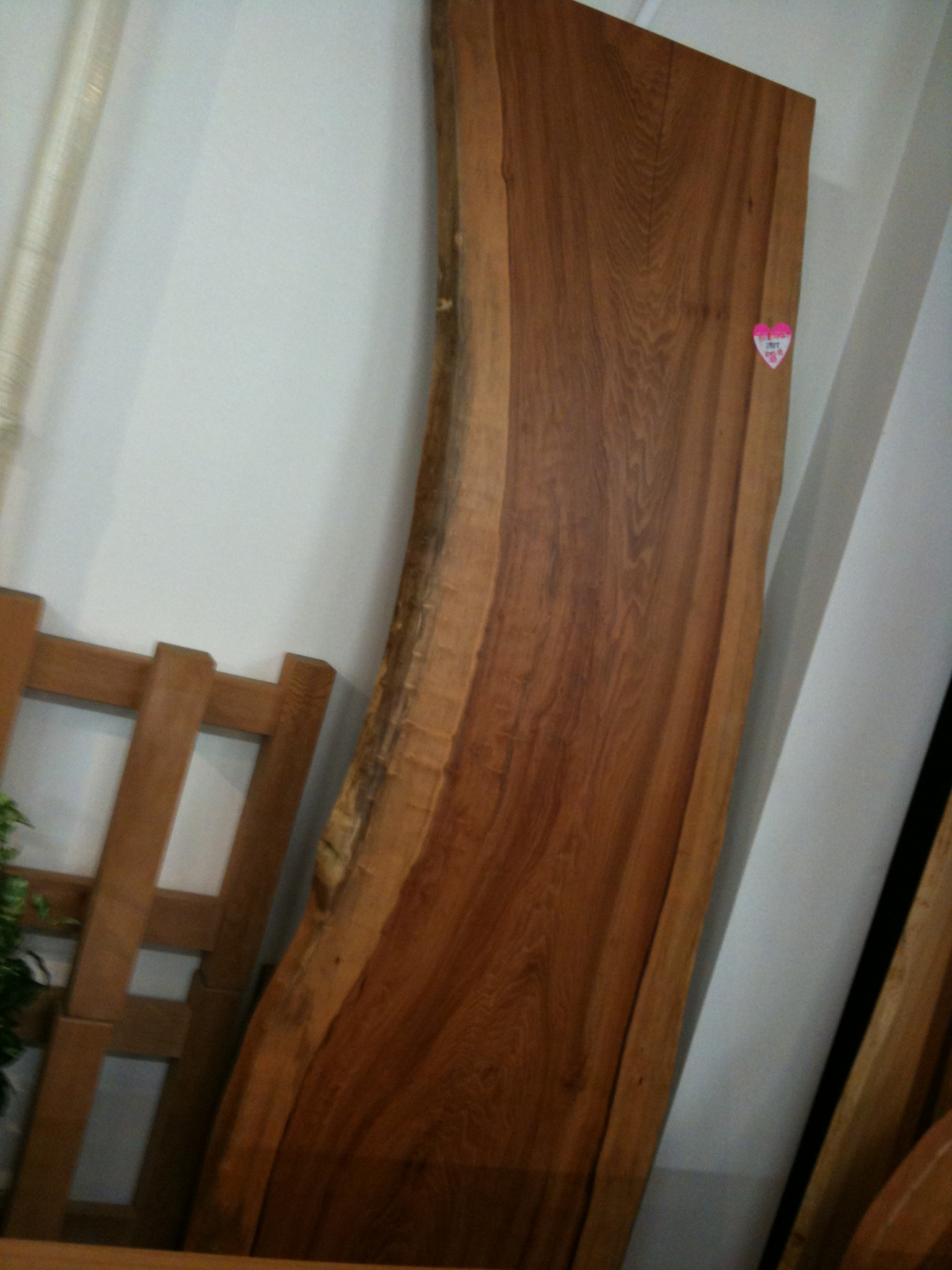
A katsura plank

Katsura is a popular ornamental tree in Japan as well as elsewhere. In Japan, it is also grown for its timber, which is used for construction and woodworking.

Several different cultivars are grown, including 'Aureum', 'Heronswood Globe', and 'Ruby'. The following have gained the Royal Horticultural Society's Award of Garden Merit (confirmed 2017):

- C. japonicum
- C. japonicum 'Heronswood Globe'
- C. japonicum f. pendulum

== Gallery ==
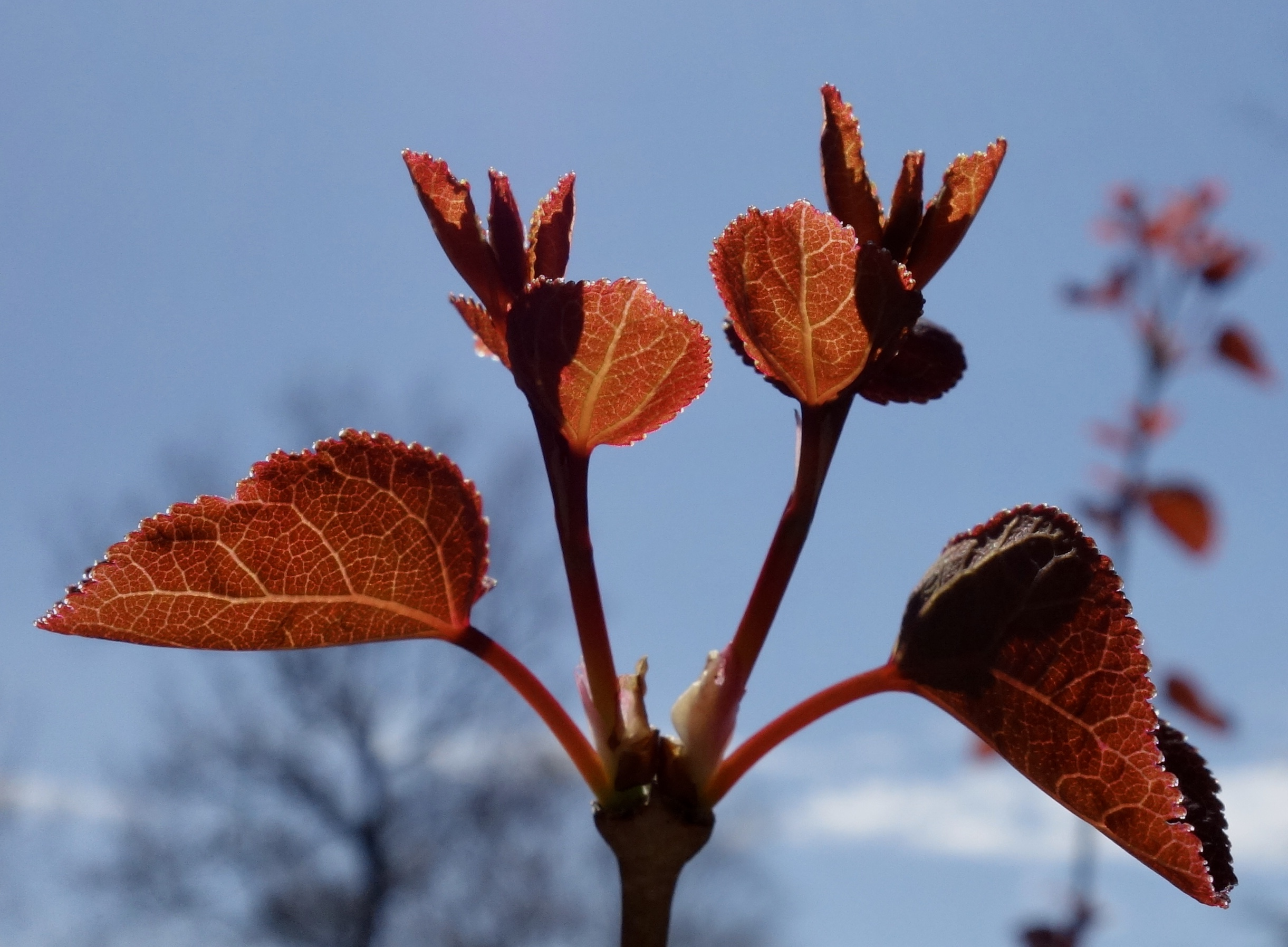
Leaves

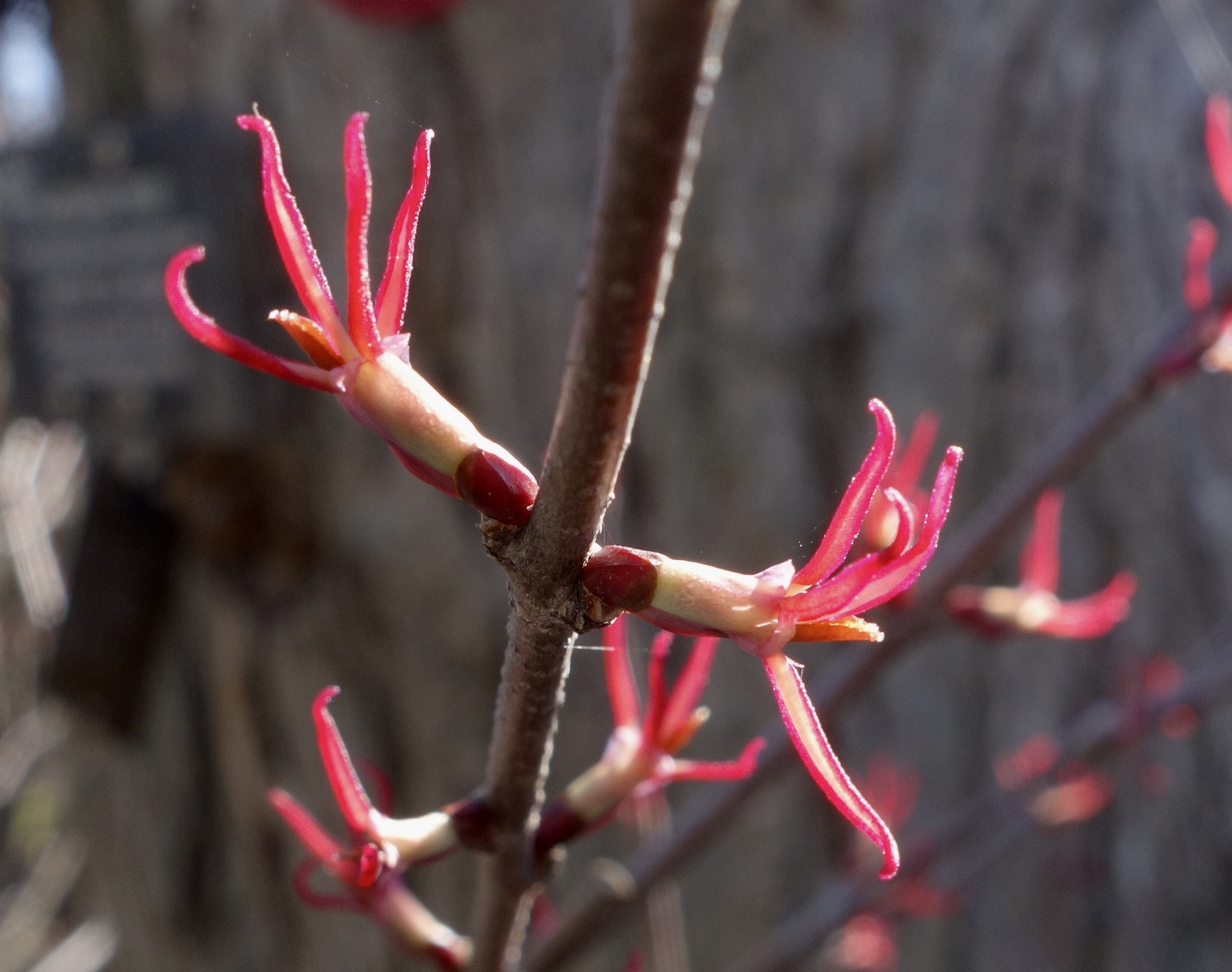
Female flowers

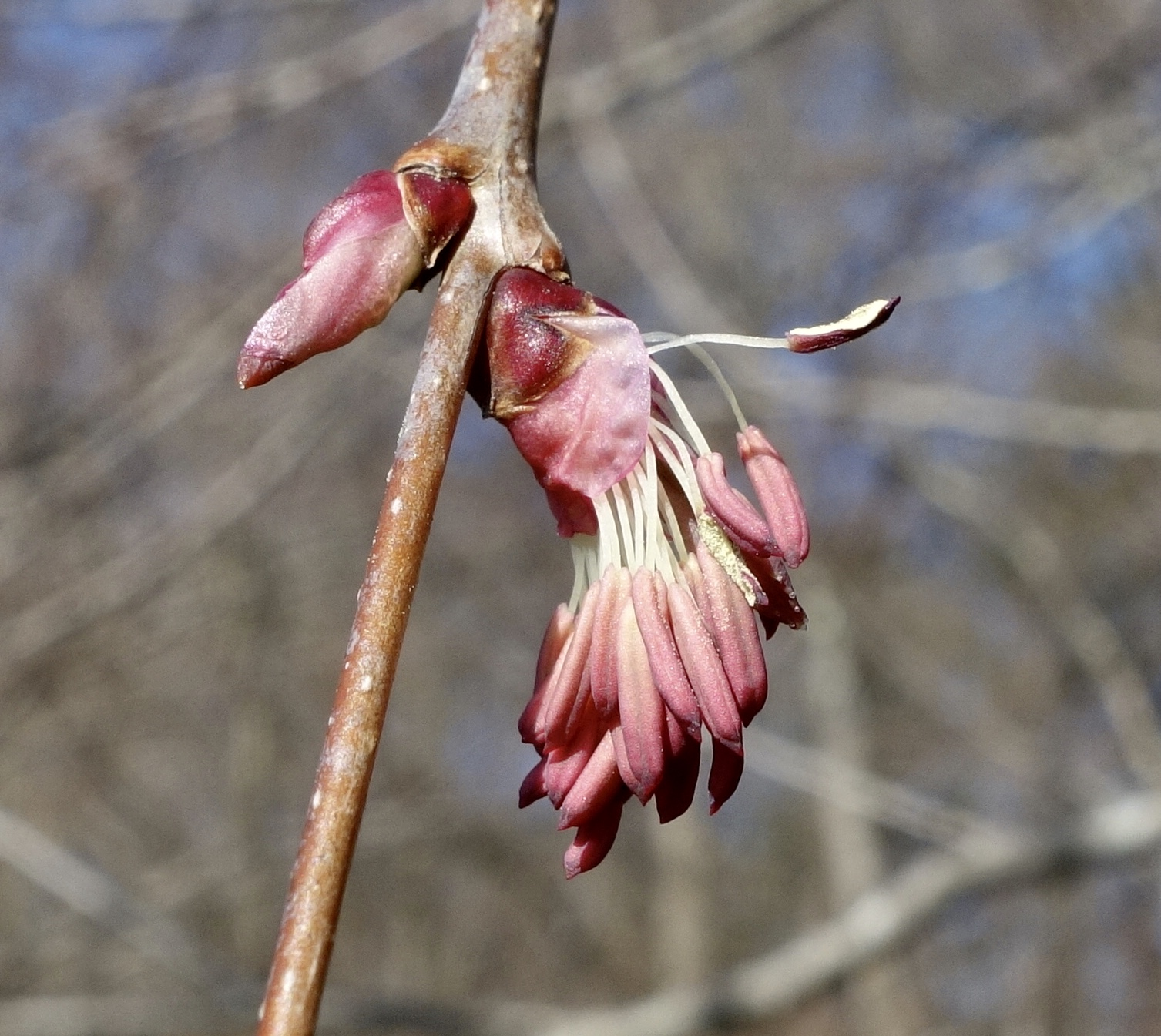
Male flowers

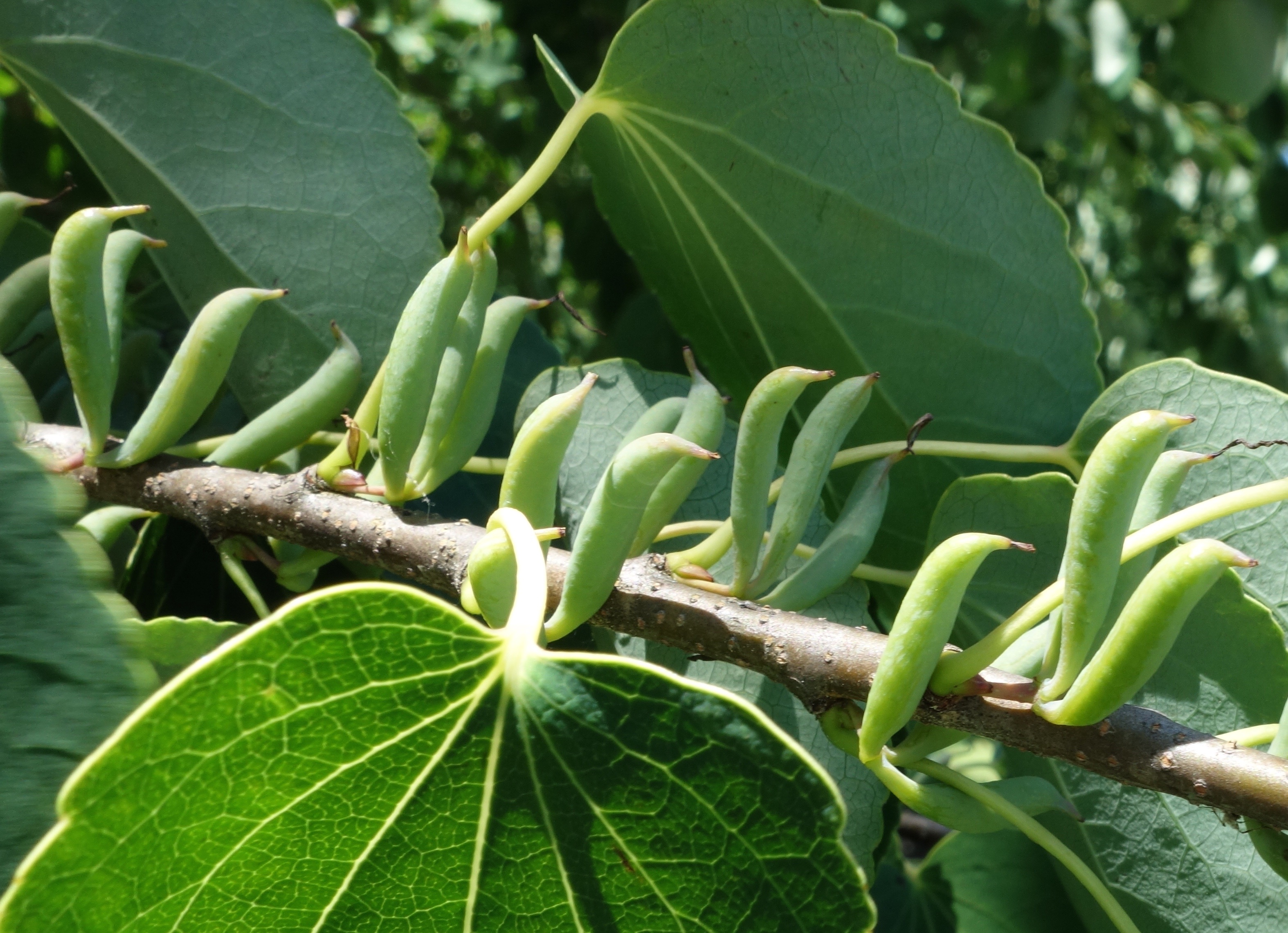
Immature fruit

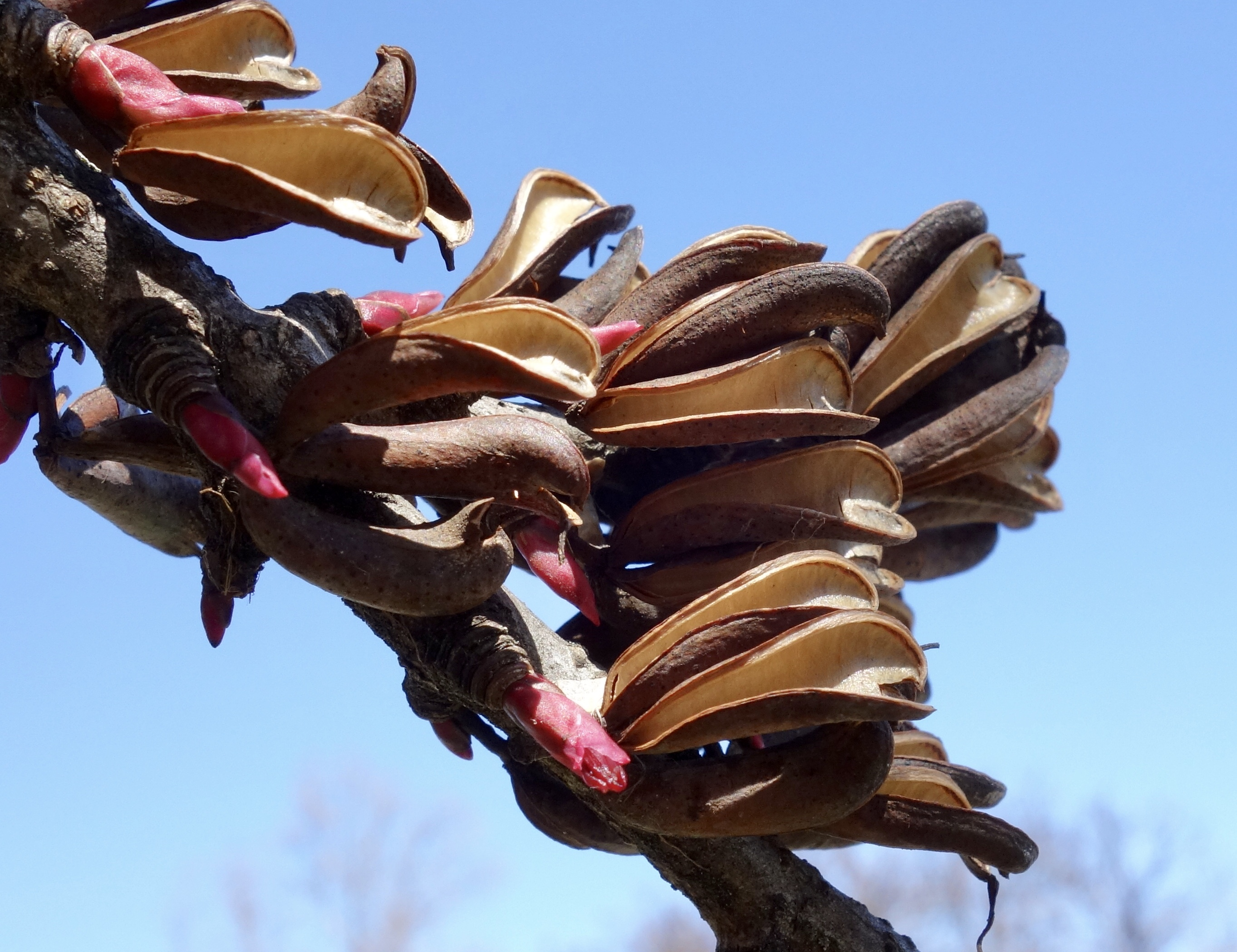
Dehisced fruits

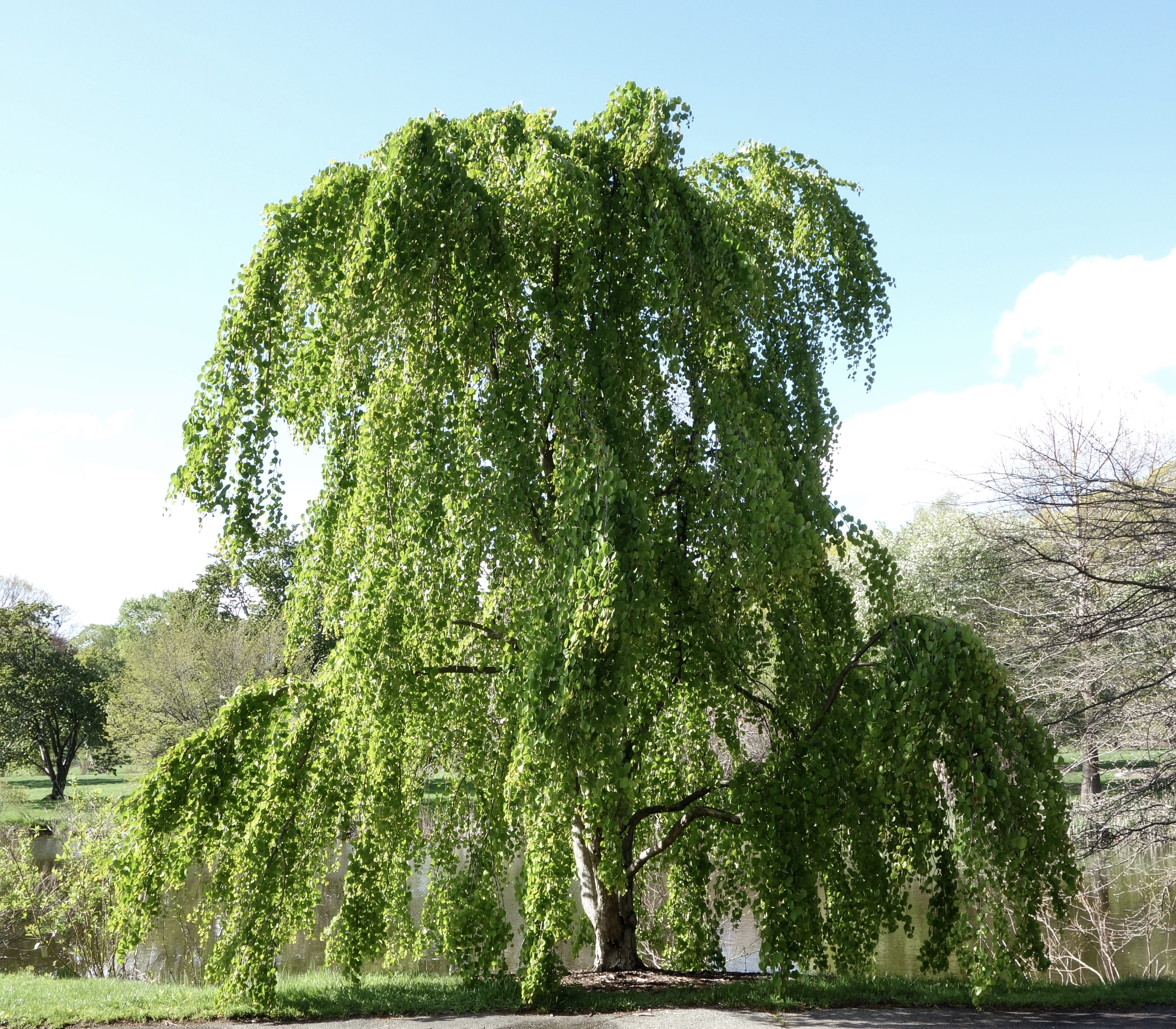
Cercidiphyllum japonicum 'Morioka Weeping' Arnold Arboretum of Harvard University
