= Fujiwara no Atsunobu =

Japanese nobleman and writer

Fujiwara no Atsunobu (藤原 敦信; fl. early 11th century CE) was a Japanese nobleman and writer of both waka and kanshi poetry.

== Life ==
Fujiwara no Atsunobu was born to Fujiwara no Aishige (藤原敦信), a member of the Shikike branch of the Fujiwara clan, and a daughter of Minamoto no Hitoshi. The year of his birth is unknown.

During the reign of Emperor En'yū, he became a student Chinese literature (文章生 monjōshō) at the Imperial University.

The record of the Dajō Daijin-den Sanjikkō Uta-awase (太政大臣殿三十講歌合), dating from the fifth month of Chōho 5 (1003 in the Julian calendar) calls him "the former governor of Higo" (前肥後守). The Midō Kanpaku-ki, the diary of Fujiwara no Michinaga, records that in the fourth month of Kankō 4 (1007) he was invited to a private banquet (密宴 mitsuen) at the Inner Palace, to which he contributed Chinese poetry.

According to the Rokuhara Mitsu-ji Engi (六波羅蜜寺縁起), he became governor of Yamashiro Province around Chōwa 1 (1012).} The Shōyūki records that he was invited to the dokusho hajime of Prince Atsunaga (敦良親王, later Emperor Go-Suzaku) in the twelfth month of Chōwa 4 (January or February 1016), at which he sat with Ōe no Takachika and Yoshishige no Tamemasa (慶滋為政), and composed poetry in Chinese.

He fathered the Confucianist and kanshi poet Fujiwara no Akihira. According to a document (奏状 sōjō) (Note: Included in Book Six of the 本朝続文粋) presented by Akihira to the emperor, his father was unfortunate in his later years, and became a Buddhist monk.

== Poetry ==
He took part in various uta-awase contests, including the Ichijō Dainagon-ke Uta-awase (一条大納言家歌合), the Kanna Ninen Dairi Uta-awase in Kanna 2 (986) and the Dajō Daijin-den Sanjikkō Uta-awase.

One of his Chinese poems was included in the Honchō Reisō.
