= Maltol =

Names
- Preferred IUPAC name 3-Hydroxy-2-methyl-4H-pyran-4-one
- Other names: Larixinic acid; Palatone; Veltol

Identifiers
CAS Number	118-71-8
3D model (JSmol)	Interactive image
ChEMBL	ChEMBL31422
ChemSpider	8066
ECHA InfoCard	100.003.884
PubChem CID	8369
UNII	3A9RD92BS4
CompTox Dashboard (EPA)	DTXSID0025523
- InChI: InChI=1S/C6H6O3/c1-4-6(8)5(7)2-3-9-4/h2-3,8H,1H3 Key: XPCTZQVDEJYUGT-UHFFFAOYSA-N; InChI=1/C6H6O3/c1-4-6(8)5(7)2-3-9-4/h2-3,8H,1H3 Key: XPCTZQVDEJYUGT-UHFFFAOYAH
- SMILES: O=C1C=COC(C)=C1O

Properties
Chemical formula	C_{6}H_{6}O_{3}
Molar mass	126.111 g·mol^{−1}
Density	1.348 g/cm^{3}
Melting point	161 to 162 °C (322 to 324 °F; 434 to 435 K)
- Except where otherwise noted, data are given for materials in their standard state (at 25 °C [77 °F], 100 kPa). verify (what is ?) Infobox references

Maltol is a naturally occurring organic compound that is used primarily as a flavor enhancer. It is found in nature in the bark of larch trees and in the needles of pine trees, and is produced during the roasting of malt (from which it gets its name) and in the baking of bread. It has the odor of caramel and is used to impart a pleasant aroma to foods and fragrances.

It is used as a flavor enhancer, is designated in the U.S. as INS number 636, and is known in the European E number food additive series as E636. It has been evaluated by JECFA, EFSA, and WHO. It is widely used in foods, perfumes, cosmetics, air fresheners, and pharmaceuticals.

== Chemistry ==
Maltol is a white crystalline powder that is soluble in hot water and other polar solvents. Like related 3-hydroxy-4-pyrones such as kojic acid, it binds to hard metal centers such as Fe^{3+}, Ga^{3+}, Al^{3+}, and VO^{2+}.

Related to this property, maltol has been reported to greatly increase aluminium uptake in the body and to increase the oral bioavailability of gallium and iron.

Maltol's strong metal binding affinity (good iron chelator), high bioavailability, and low toxicity profile make it an excellent scaffold for designing novel compounds for therapeutic applications.

== See also ==
- Ethyl maltol
- Ferric maltol
- Gallium maltolate
- 5-Hydroxymaltol
- Isomaltol
- allomaltol, an isomer of maltol Zinc-reduction of the chloromethyl compound gives maltol.
