= João Geraldo Kuhlmann =

Brazilian botanist (1882–1958)

João Geraldo Kuhlmann (1882 Blumenau, Santa Catarina -1958 Rio de Janeiro, Rio de Janeiro) was a Brazilian botanist.

== Life ==
Kuhlmann was a specialist on taxonomy of angiosperms. He was a great collector of herborized material (his collection was gathered at a museum - Botanical Museum Kuhlmann, created in 1960, later the Botanical Museum of the Botanical Garden of Rio de Janeiro opened to the public on September 20, 1991, incorporated this collection of the Kuhlmann Museum) and notable connoisseur of the Brazilian Flora, influencing a large number of researchers in this area of the knowledge in Brazil, for example William Rodrigues. He published about eighty works, describing new genera (see below), and species. He also erected two families. He put Peridiscus in a family by itself in 1950. Peridiscaceae has since been expanded to include Medusandra, Soyauxia, and Whittonia. He also put Duckeodendron into its own family, Duckeodendraceae, but this, and other segregates of Solanaceae are no longer recognized as separate families by APG. In 1944 he became the director of the Rio de Janeiro Botanical Garden, exerting this function up to 1951.

J. G. Kuhlmann created the Botanical Society of Brazil.

The genera Kuhlmannia J.C.Gomes, synonym of Pleonotoma,(in the family of Bignoniaceae) and Kuhlmaniella Barroso, synonym of Dicranostyles, (in Convolvulaceae family) and also Kuhlmanniodendron (from Brazil), described in 2008 by Fiaschi & Groppo in the family of Achariaceae are named in his honour.

== Some works ==
- (in Portuguese) Kuhlmann, J. G. & A. J. Sampaio (1928): Clinostemon, novo Gênero de Lauráceas da Amazônia. Boletim do Museu Nacional do Rio de Janeiro 4 (2):57-59. (Clinostemon, new genus of Lauraceae from Amazonia).
- (in Portuguese) Kuhlmann, J. G. Arquivos do Serviço Florestal 3: 4. 1950 (paper which he described the new family Peridiscaceae).

== List of plant genera authored by João Geraldo Kuhlmann ==
- Clinostemon Kuhlm. & Samp. syn. of Mezilaurus Kuntze ex Taub. Lauraceae
- Cyrillopsis Kuhlm. Linaceae or Ixonanthaceae
- Dialypetalanthus Kuhlm. Dialypetalanthaceae or Rubiaceae
- Didymocistus Kuhlm. Euphorbiaceae or Phyllanthaceae
- Duckeodendron Kuhlm. Solanaceae
- Goniodiscus Kuhlm. Celastraceae
- Hydrogaster Kuhlm. Tiliaceae or Grewioideae in Malvaceae sensu lato or Sparrmanniaceae
- Merianthera Kuhlm. Melastomataceae
- Paradrypetes Kuhlm. Picrodendraceae or Rhizophoraceae
- Paratecoma Kuhlm. Bignoniaceae
- Spheneria Kuhlm. Poaceae
- Sterigmapetalum Kuhlm. Rhizophoraceae
