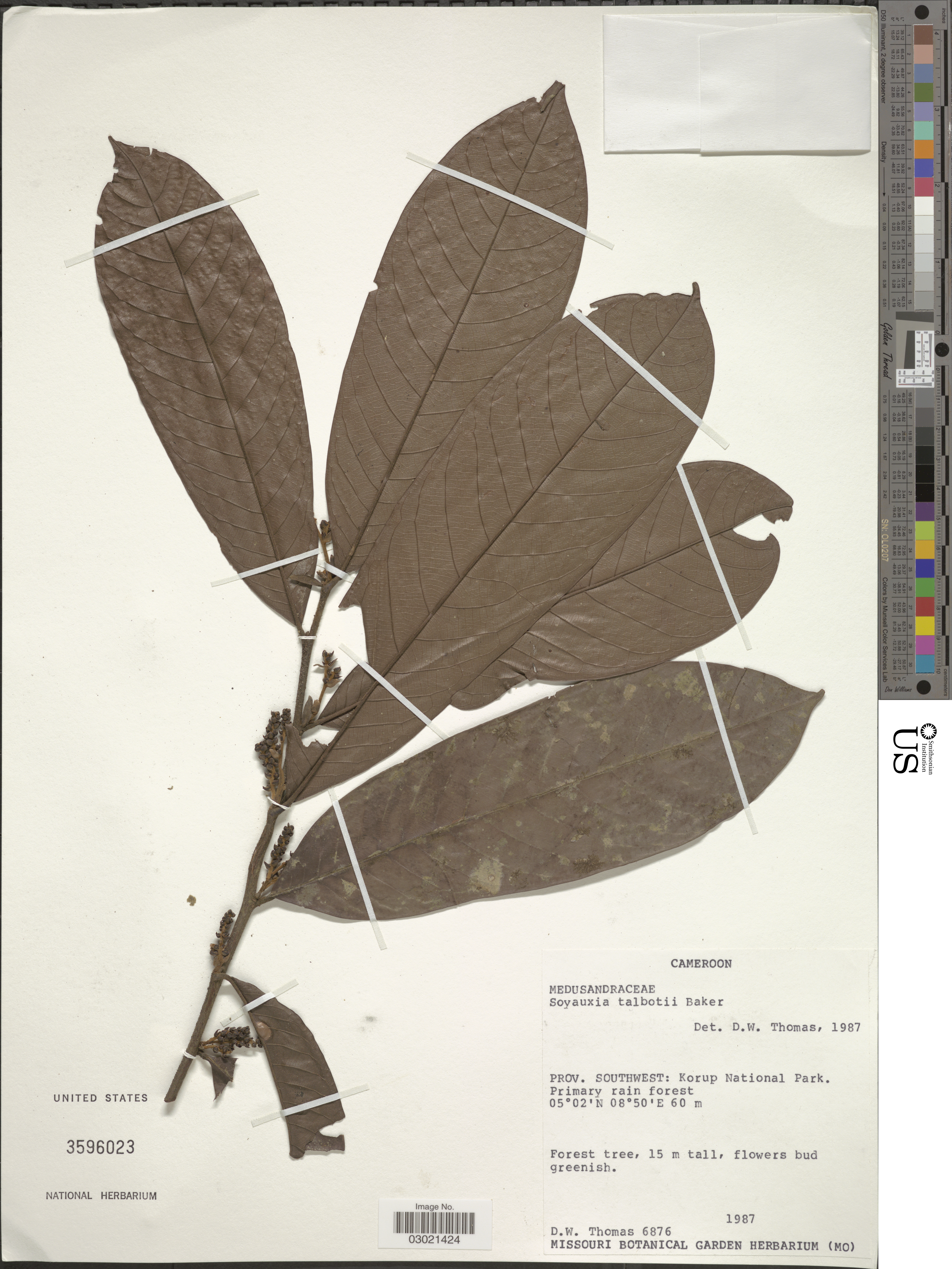
- Soyauxia talbotii

Scientific classification
- Kingdom: Plantae
- Clade: Tracheophytes
- Clade: Angiosperms
- Clade: Eudicots
- Order: Saxifragales
- Family: Peridiscaceae
- Genus: Soyauxia; Oliv.

Type species
- Soyauxia gabonensis Oliv.

= Soyauxia =

Genus of flowering plants

Soyauxia is a genus of flowering plants in the family Peridiscaceae. They are small trees or erect shrubs from wet forests of tropical West Africa. Eight specific names have been published in Soyauxia. Additional species have been discovered, but their names and descriptions will not be published until 2009 or 2010. The type species for the genus is Soyauxia gabonensis.

Soyauxia was long considered an anomaly and it has been variously classified by different authors, usually in Passifloraceae or in the defunct plant family Flacourtiaceae. The first molecular phylogenetic study to include Soyauxia placed it in Peridiscaceae. Its position within that family was determined in 2009.

== Species ==
Soyauxia contains the following species (but this list may be incomplete or contain synonyms.):

- Soyauxia bipindensis, Gilg ex Baker f.
- Soyauxia floribunda, Hutchinson
- Soyauxia gabonensis, Oliv.
- Soyauxia glabrescens, Engler
- Soyauxia grandifolia, Gilg & Stapf
- Soyauxia ledermanii, Sleumer
- Soyauxia talbotii, Baker f.
- Soyauxia velutina, Hutchinson & Dalziel

== History ==
The genus Soyauxia was named by Daniel Oliver in 1880, in a book whose final edition was entitled Hooker's Icones Plantarum. It was named for the German botanist and plant collector Hermann Soyaux. Upon naming it, Oliver wrote

Mons. Soyaux, now settled in the Gaboon, well deserves that his name should be associated with one of his interesting discoveries in that region. If he can supply fruiting specimens to his Berlin correspondents, who most liberally allow us to share his collections, it would enable us to complete the description of Soyauxia.

— Daniel Oliver

Oliver placed the new genus in Passifloraceae and described one species, Soyauxia gabonensis.

In 1953, John Brenan put Soyauxia in Medusandraceae, a family that he had established the year before. Brenan's classification was not generally followed by others, and John Hutchinson wrote a detailed account of why he thought that Soyauxia and Medusandra were not closely related.

In 2007, in the first comparison of DNA sequences to include Soyauxia, it was shown that Soyauxia is sister to a clade of two South American trees, Peridiscus and Whittonia. The authors recommended that Soyauxia be moved to Peridiscaceae. The position of Soyauxia within Peridiscaceae was clarified in 2009, with the inclusion of Medusandra in a phylogenetic study. In that study, it was shown that Brenan's concept of Medusandraceae is paraphyletic over Peridiscaceae sensu stricto, but that Brenan had been prescient in his perception of a relationship between Medusandra and Soyauxia. The authors recommended that Medusandra as well as Soyauxia be transferred to Peridiscaceae.
