= Soyauxia talbotii =

Conservation status
- Endangered (IUCN 2.3)

Scientific classification
- Kingdom: Plantae
- Clade: Embryophytes
- Clade: Tracheophytes
- Clade: Spermatophytes
- Clade: Angiosperms
- Clade: Eudicots
- Order: Saxifragales
- Family: Peridiscaceae
- Genus: Soyauxia
- Species: S. talbotii

Binomial name
- Soyauxia talbotii Baker f.

Species of flowering plant

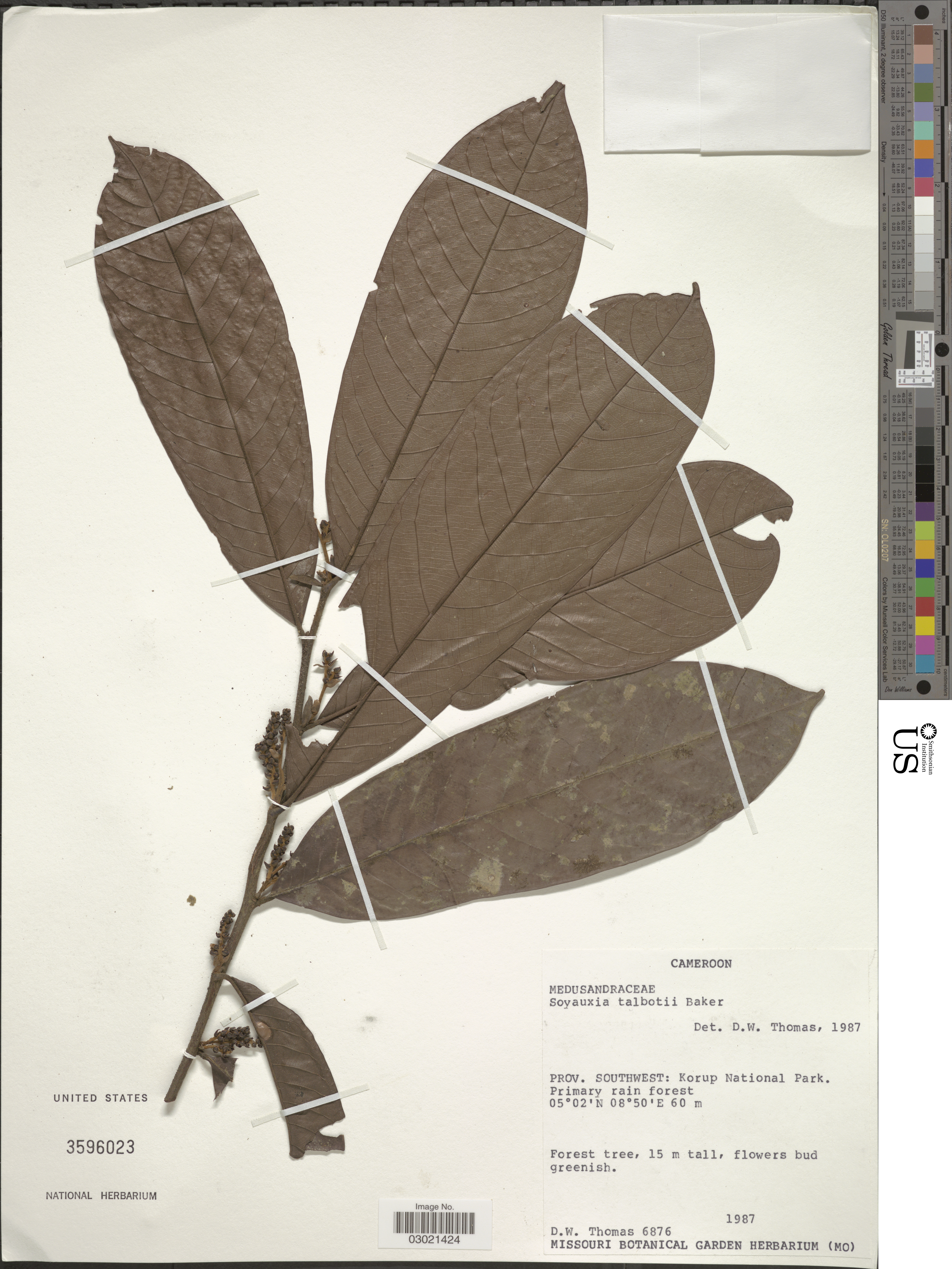

Soyauxia talbotii is a species of plant in the Peridiscaceae family. It is endemic to Nigeria.
