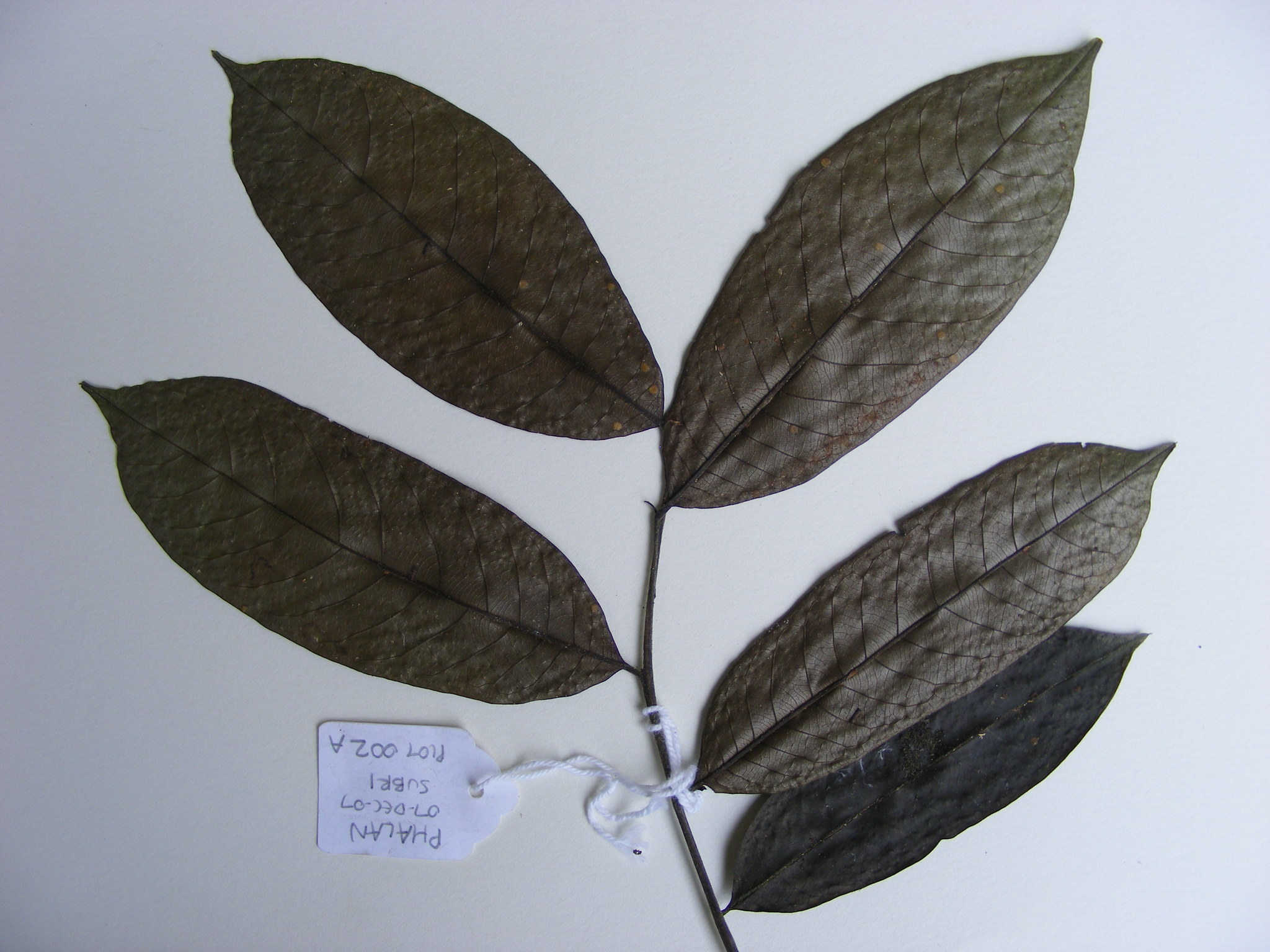

Scientific classification
- Kingdom: Plantae
- Clade: Tracheophytes
- Clade: Angiosperms
- Clade: Eudicots
- Order: Saxifragales
- Family: Peridiscaceae
- Genus: Soyauxia
- Species: S. velutina

Binomial name
- Soyauxia velutina Hutch. & Dalziel

= Soyauxia velutina =

Species of plant

Soyauxia velutina is a species of flowering plant from the family Peridiscaceae.
