= Acalolepta sculpturata =

Scientific classification
- Kingdom: Animalia
- Phylum: Arthropoda
- Clade: Pancrustacea
- Class: Insecta
- Order: Coleoptera
- Suborder: Polyphaga
- Infraorder: Cucujiformia
- Family: Cerambycidae
- Genus: Acalolepta
- Species: A. sculpturata

Binomial name
- Acalolepta sculpturata (Aurivillius, 1924)

Synonyms
- Dihammus sculpturatus Aurivillius, 1924

Species of beetle

Acalolepta sculpturata is a species of beetle in the family Cerambycidae. It was described by Per Olof Christopher Aurivillius in 1924. It is known from Java. This bug is native to the Paleotropical Kingdom and Indomalayan realm of Asia.
