= Cupuliferoidaepollenites =

Scientific classification
- Kingdom: Plantae
- Clade: Tracheophytes
- Clade: Angiosperms
- Genus: †Cupuliferoidaepollenites; Potonié et al. 1950 ex Potonié 1960

Type species
- Cupuliferoidaepollenites liblarensis Thomson in Potonié et al., 1960

Species
- List of species: C. fallax; C. liblarensis; C. parvulus; C. quisqualis; "C. prolatus"; "C. phimosus"; "C. krempi"; "C. arxanensis"; "C. breviclopatus"

Genus of cretaceous angiosperms (fossil)

Cupuliferoidaepollenites was a genus of early Cretaceous (late Albian) angiosperm with many different species. Paleo-botanical evidence shows a migration pattern of its ancestors beginning in paleotropical regions of East Asia and its migration through Indonesia and some ancestors settling in Australia.
