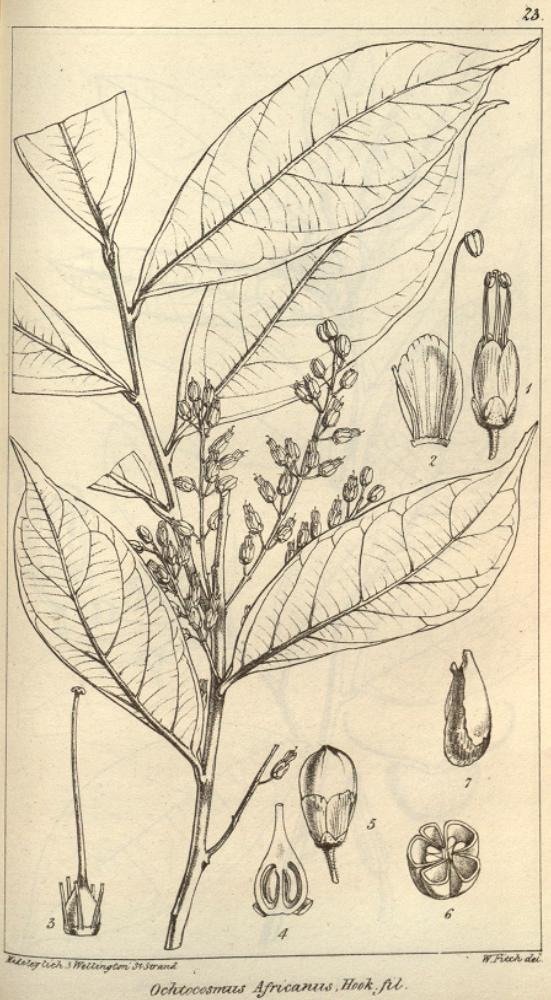
- Phyllocosmus africanus

Scientific classification
- Kingdom: Plantae
- Clade: Tracheophytes
- Clade: Angiosperms
- Clade: Eudicots
- Clade: Rosids
- Order: Malpighiales
- Family: Ixonanthaceae
- Genus: Phyllocosmus; Klotzsch

Type species
- Phyllocosmus africanus (Hook.f.) Klotzsch

Species
- Phyllocosmus africanus; Phyllocosmus calothyrsus; Phyllocosmus congolensis; Phyllocosmus lemaireanus; Phyllocosmus sessiliflorus

= Phyllocosmus =

Genus of trees

Phyllocosmus is a genus of small trees in the family Ixonanthaceae native to tropical Africa. It is closely related to the South American genus Ochthocosmus and was once considered to be a part of it.
