= I. chinensis =

I. chinensis may refer to:

- Iris chinensis or Ixia chinensis, synonyms for Iris domestica, the blackberry lily, leopard flower or leopard lily, an ornamental plant species
- Ixonanthes chinensis, a plant species found in China and Vietnam

== See also ==
- Chinensis (disambiguation)
