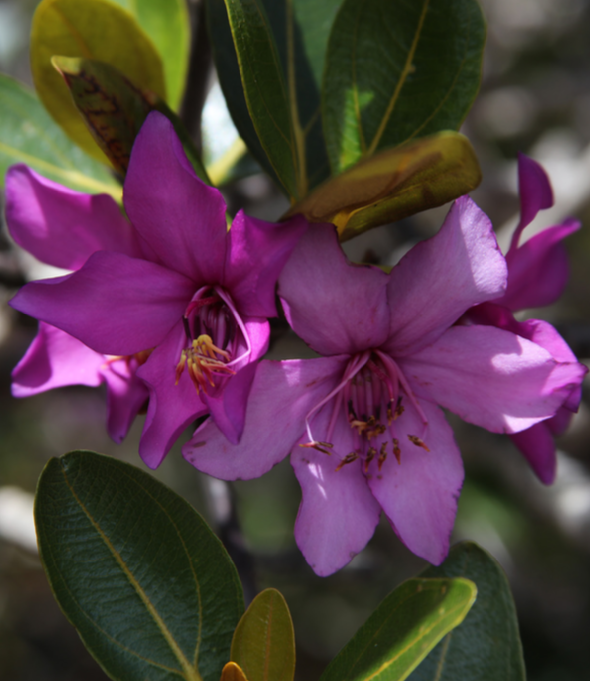

Scientific classification
- Kingdom: Plantae
- Clade: Tracheophytes
- Clade: Angiosperms
- Clade: Eudicots
- Clade: Rosids
- Order: Myrtales
- Family: Melastomataceae
- Genus: Merianthera
- Species: M. calyptrata

Binomial name
- Merianthera calyptrata R.Goldenb., Bochorny & Fraga
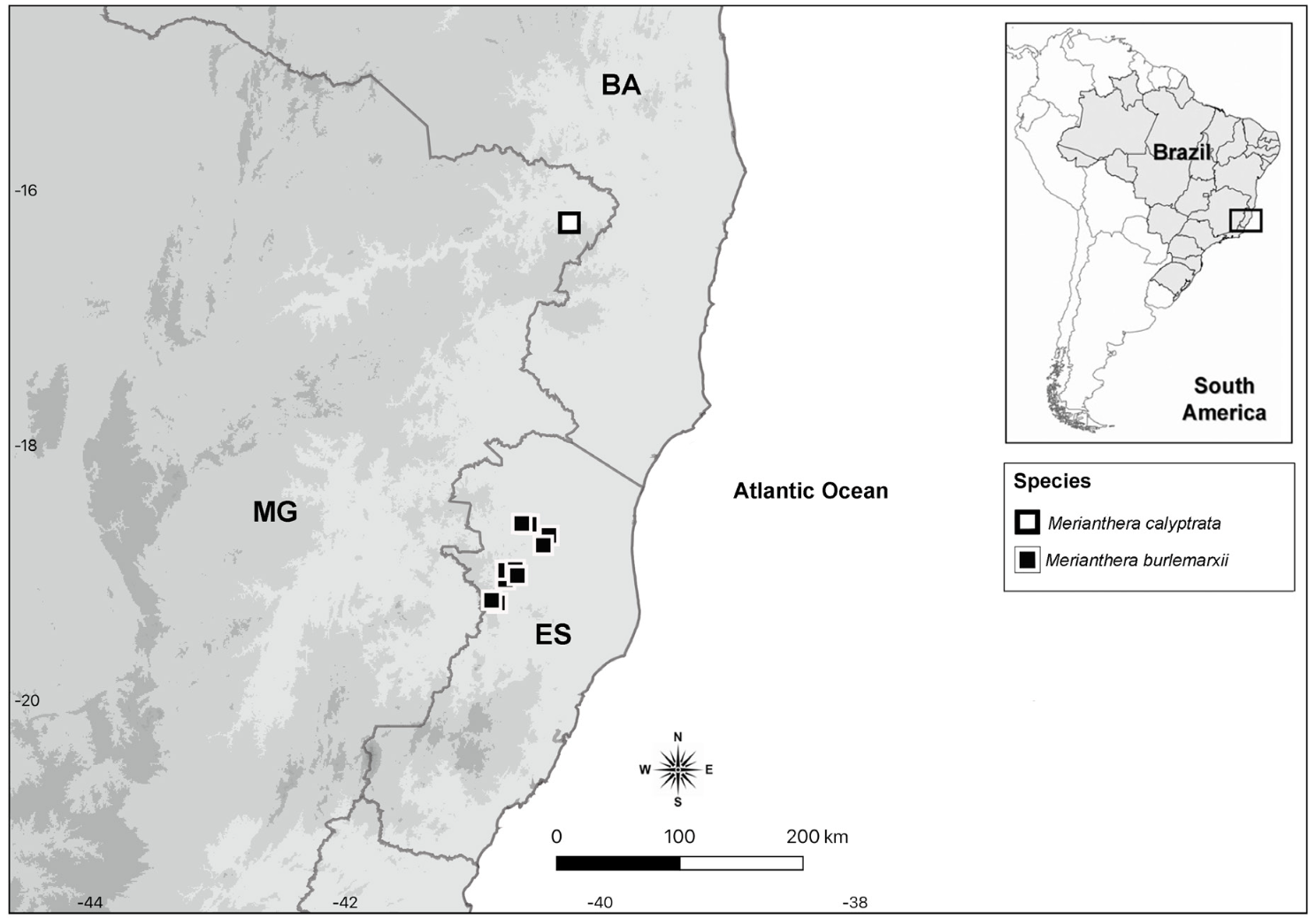
- Range

= Merianthera calyptrata =

Species of plant

Merianthera calyptrata is a species of flowering shrub in the genus Merianthera. Discovery of the new plant was initiated by the posting of a photo on DetWeb, a Facebook group documenting Brazilian plants, by Mr. Reginaldo Vasconcelos.

== Origin of name ==
The derivation of the epithet for this species is from the flowers having a calyptrate calyx. This particular characteristics is unique to the species and not known to occur in other species in the genus and tribe.

== Description ==
Merianthera calyptrata belongs to the family Melastomataceae and is one of seven species found in Eastern Brazil. The species is similar to Merianthera burlemarxii with a few characteristic differences: "the total absences of both a peduncle and bracteoles, the calyptrate calyx and the fruits developing from inferior ovaries and dehiscing through longitudinal slits." The species can be identified as a shrub or treelet at a height of up to 2.5m with candelabriform branches, leaves are opposite and caducous, flowers are pedicellate (5-6) ranging from purple to pink depending on developmental age, hypanthium is conical at 5-7 mm, antesepalous, dimorphic stamen (10-12), inferior ovary 7-10mm, ribbed fruit that ruptures when mature, and pyramidal seeds.

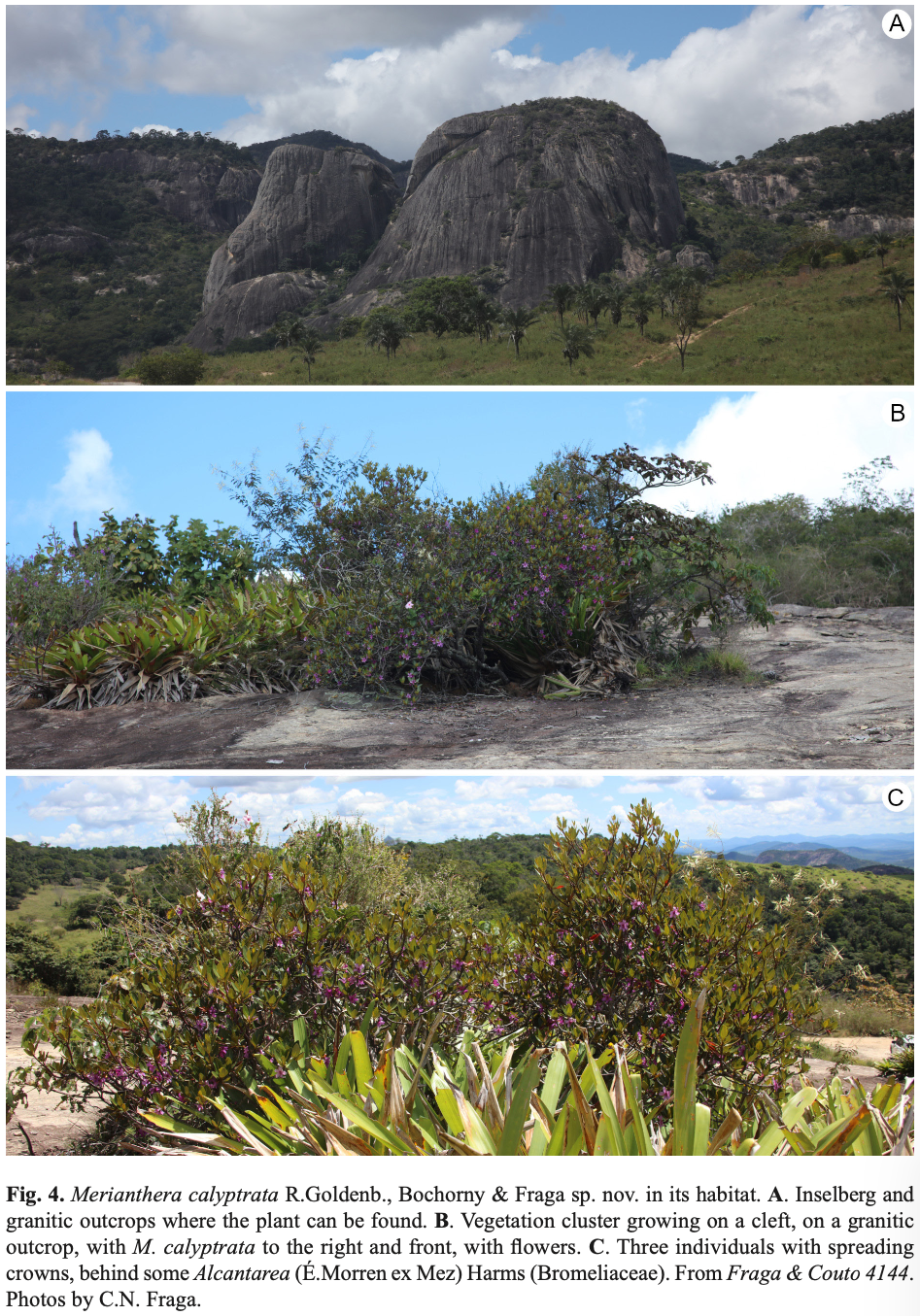
Merianthera calyptrata pictured in habitat

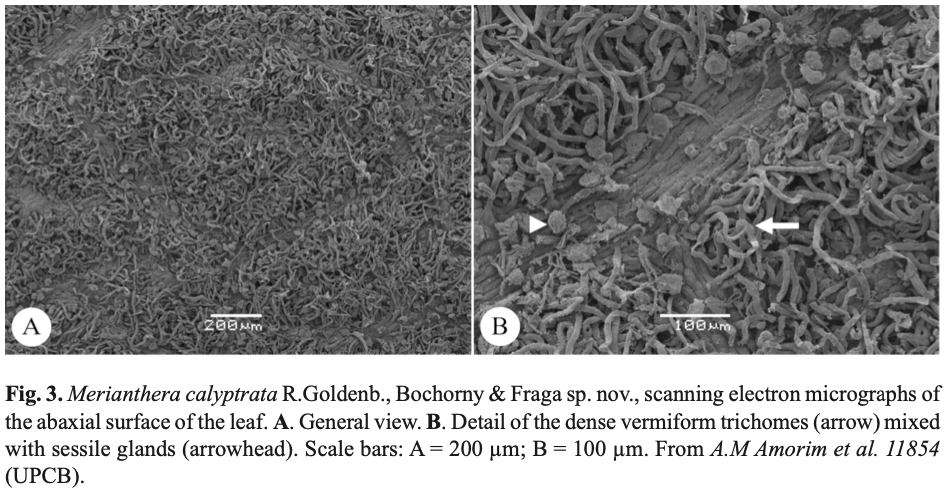
Scanning electron microscopy images of leaf

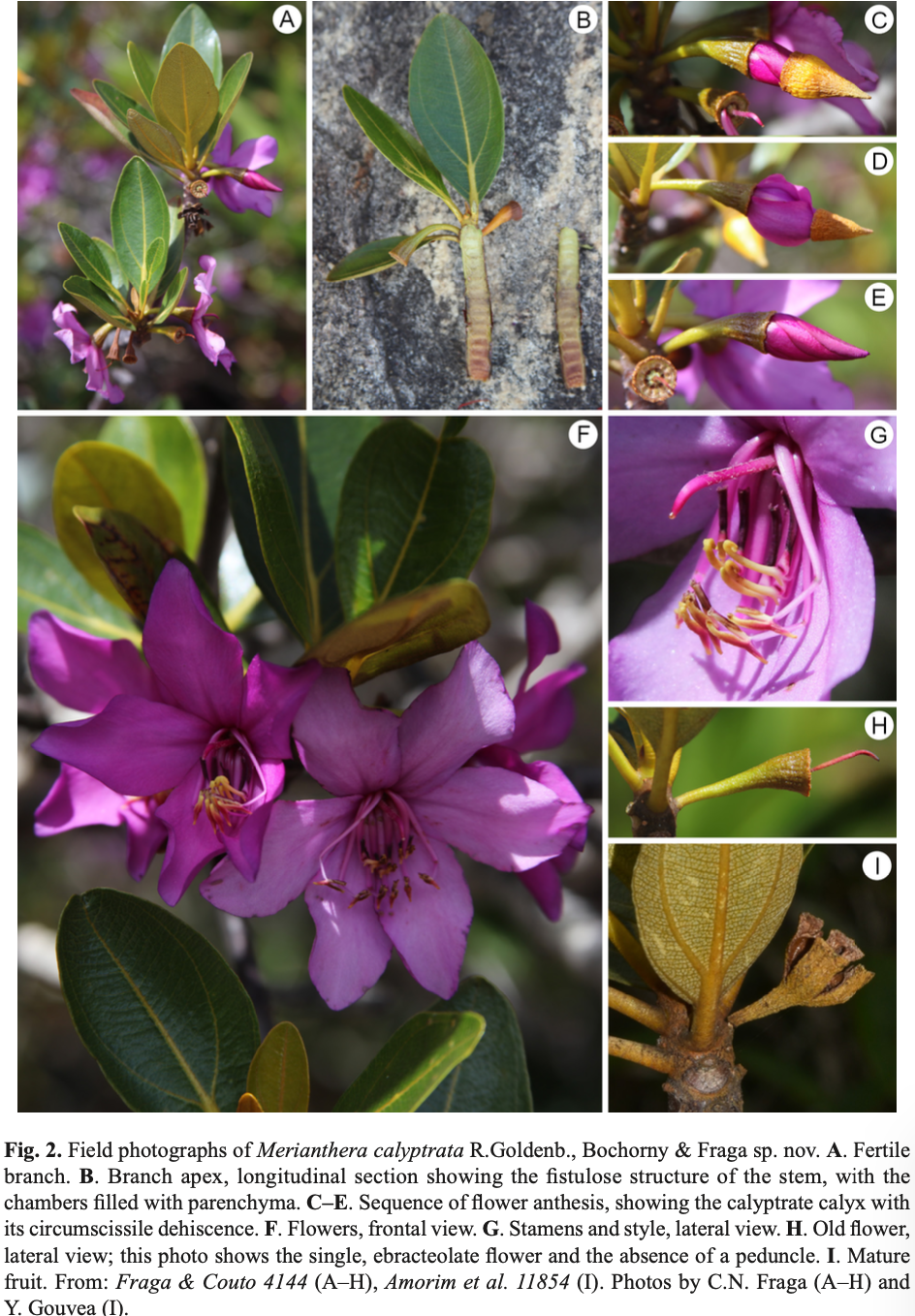
Field photos of Merianthera calyptrata

== Habitat ==
Merianthera calyptrata has been sighted in Jacinto, in northeastern Minas Gerais, Brazil on inselbergs and granite outcroppings, an area that experiences dry winters and wet summers. The flowers were documented with young buds in February and flowers in March as well as the presence of fruit suggesting the fruit are potentially around all year.

== Conservation ==
With only three sightings, there is not enough data to support information about the species per the Guidelines for Using the IUCN Red List Categories and Criteria. According to Goldenberg(2023), its scarcity and limited sightings in a specific location, as well as its susceptibility to negative impacts from random environmental events, it is advisable to classify this species within the Vulnerable category.
