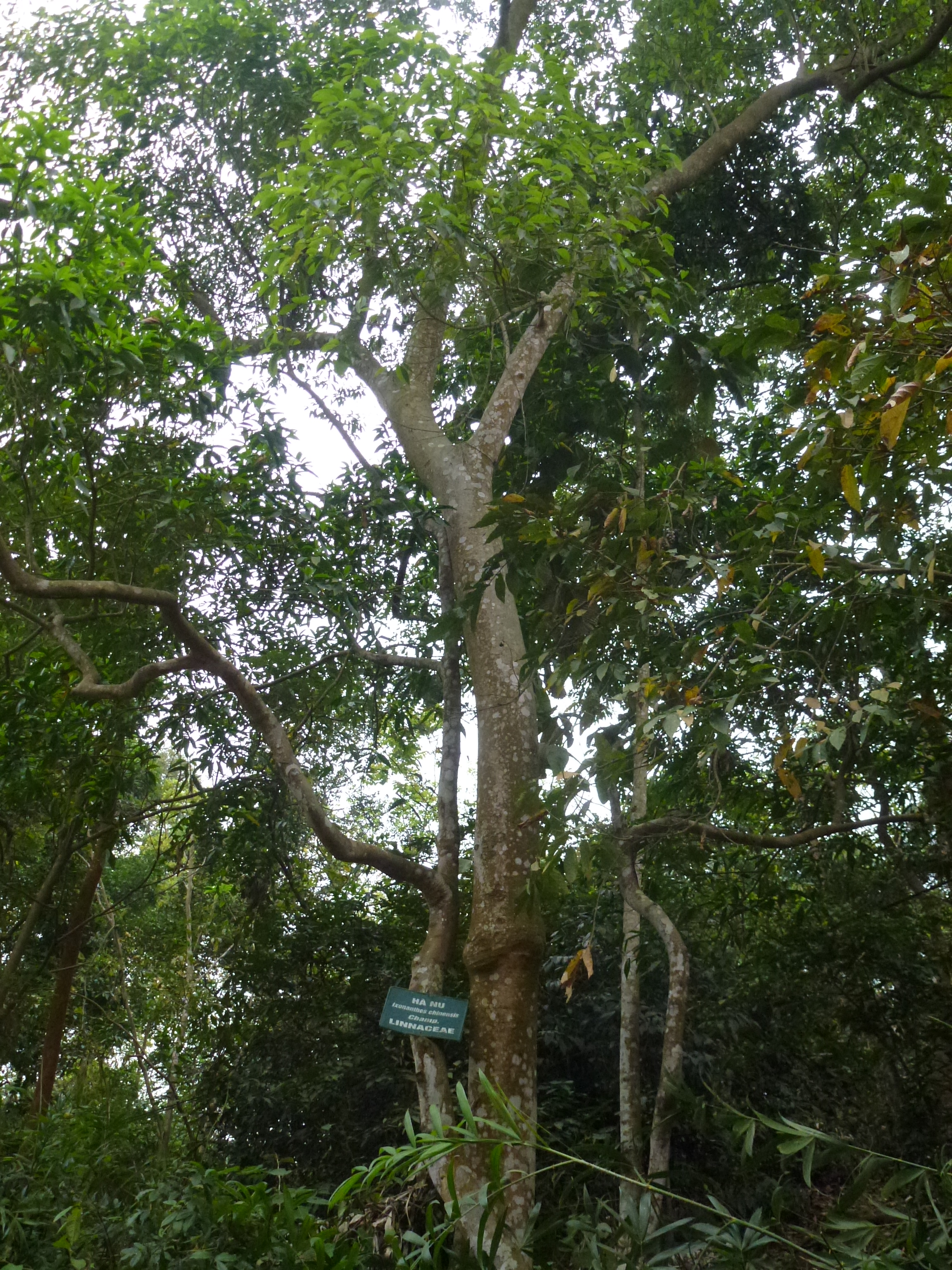

Conservation status
- Least Concern (IUCN 3.1)

Scientific classification
- Kingdom: Plantae
- Clade: Tracheophytes
- Clade: Angiosperms
- Clade: Eudicots
- Clade: Rosids
- Order: Malpighiales
- Family: Ixonanthaceae
- Genus: Ixonanthes
- Species: I. reticulata

Binomial name
- Ixonanthes reticulata Jack

Synonyms
- Discogyne papuana Schltr.; Emmenanthus chinensis Hook. & Arn.; Ixonanthes beccarii Hallier f.; Ixonanthes chinensis Champ.; Ixonanthes cochinchinensis Pierre; Ixonanthes crassifolia Hallier f.; Ixonanthes grandiflora Hochr.; Ixonanthes grandifolia Ridl.; Ixonanthes hancei Pierre ex Laness.; Ixonanthes khasiana Hook.f.; Ixonanthes longipedunculata Merr.; Ixonanthes papuana (Schltr.) H.J.P.Winkl.; Ixonanthes parvifolia Merr.; Gordonia decandra Roxb.

= Ixonanthes reticulata =

Species of flowering plant

Ixonanthes reticulata is a species of plant in the Ixonanthaceae family. It is native to an area from China to India (Assam and Meghalaya) to mainland and maritime Southeast Asia. It is a broadleaf evergreen.

== Conservation ==
Ixonanthes chinensis was assessed as "vulnerable" in the 1998 IUCN Red List, where it was described as native to China and Vietnam. As of January 2024, Ixonanthes chinensis was regarded as a synonym of Ixonanthes reticulata, which has a wider distribution.

Ixonanthes khasiana was also assessed as "vulnerable" in the 1998 IUCN Red List, where it was described as native to Assam and Meghalaya. As of January 2024, Ixonanthes khasiana was also regarded as a synonym of Ixonanthes reticulata, which has a wider distribution.
