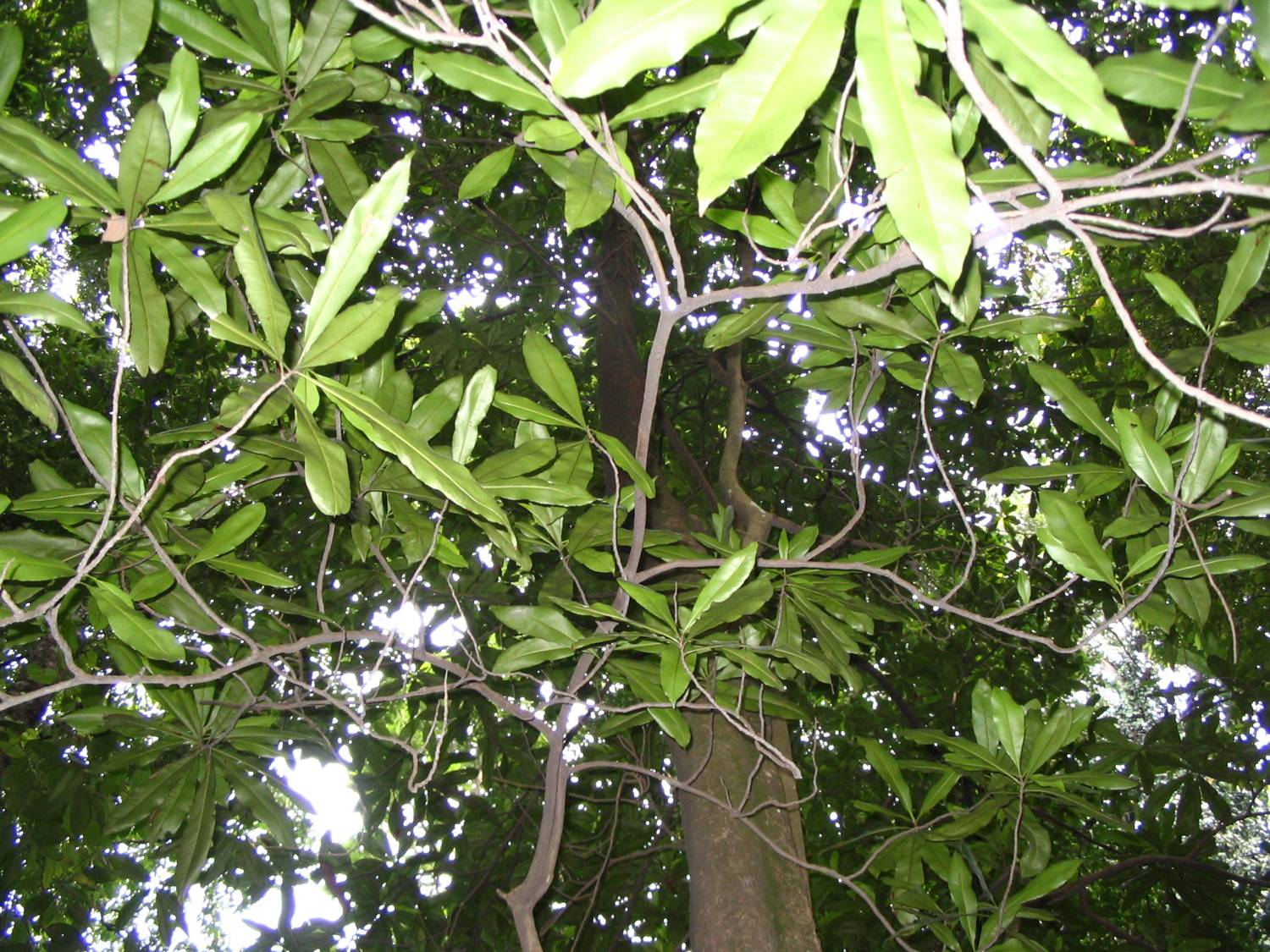
- Ixonanthes icosandra

Scientific classification
- Kingdom: Plantae
- Clade: Tracheophytes
- Clade: Angiosperms
- Clade: Eudicots
- Clade: Rosids
- Order: Malpighiales
- Family: Ixonanthaceae
- Genus: Ixonanthes; Jack

Synonyms
- Brewstera M.Roem.; Discogyne Schltr.; Emmenanthus Hook. & Arn.; Pierotia Blume

= Ixonanthes =

Genus of trees

Ixonanthes is a genus of trees in the family Ixonanthaceae. It contains the following species:

- Ixonanthes icosandra Jack
- Ixonanthes petiolaris Blume – from Thailand to the Philippines and Sulawesi
- Ixonanthes reticulata Jack – from China to New Guinea
