= Paleotropical kingdom =

One of the Earth's six floristic kingdoms

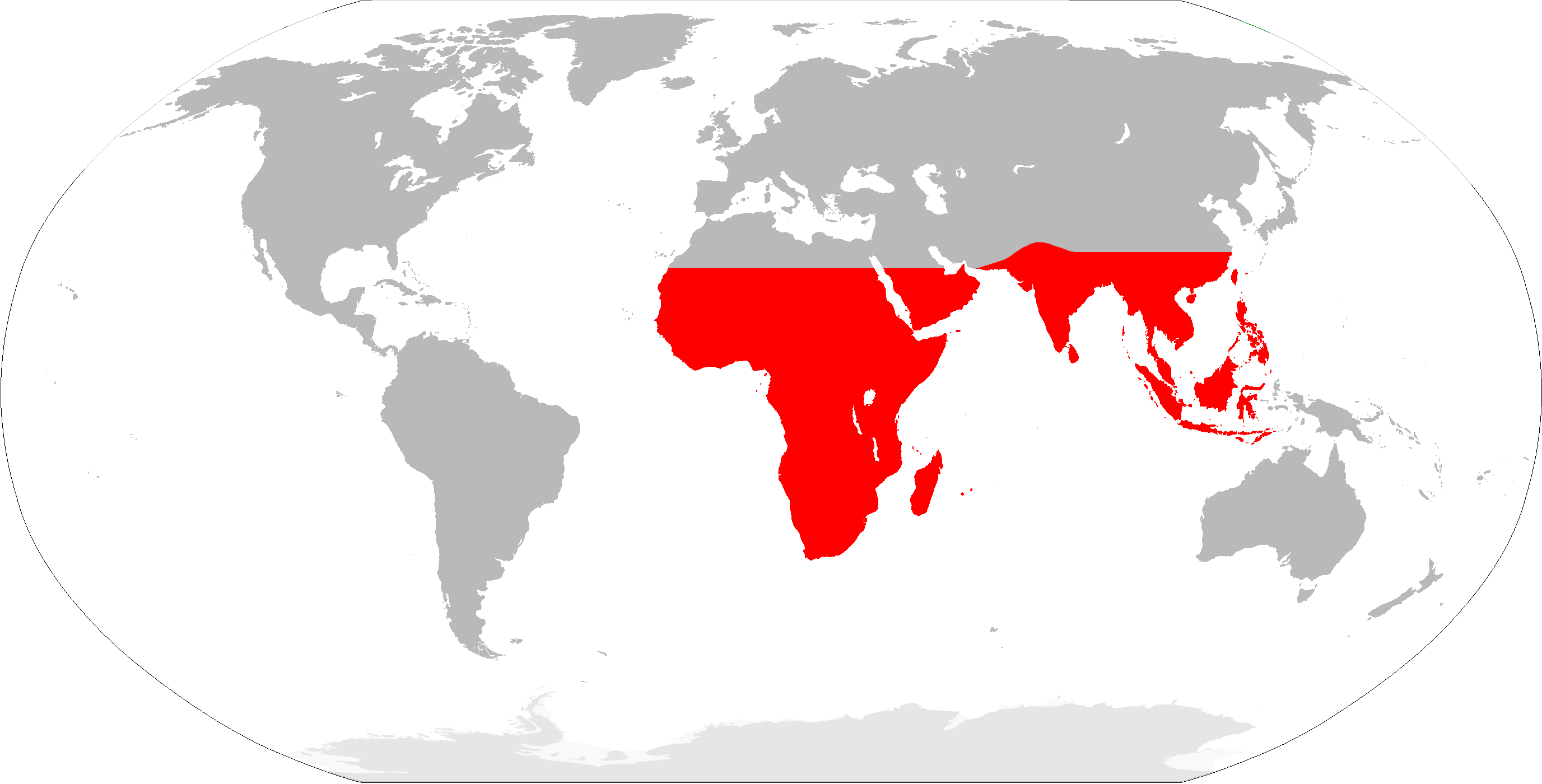
Extent of the Paleotropical kingdom

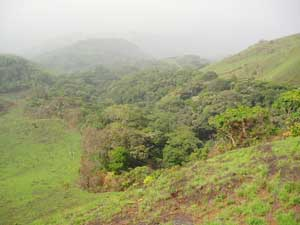
Gallery forest in Guinea

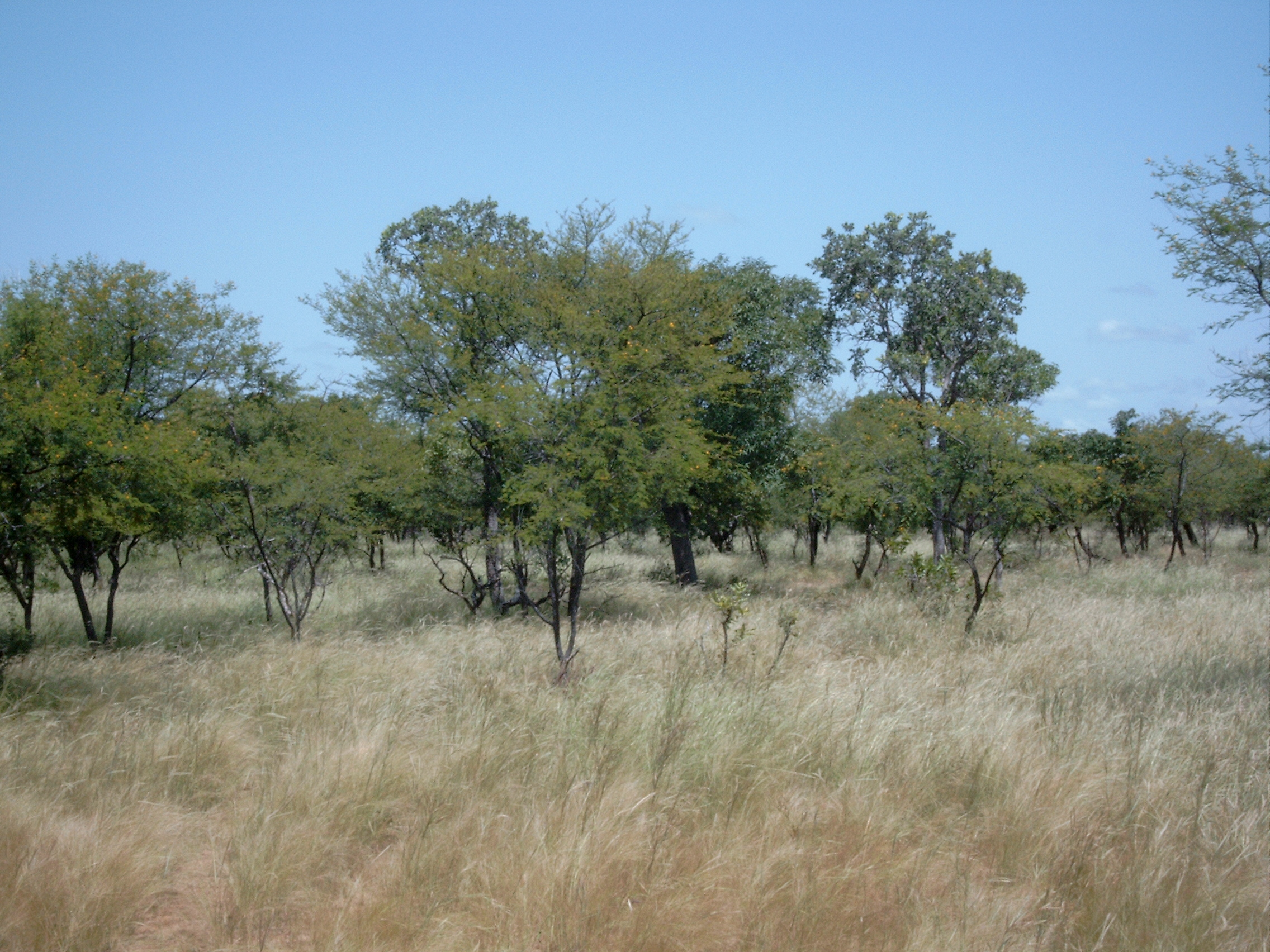
Savanna in Burkina Faso

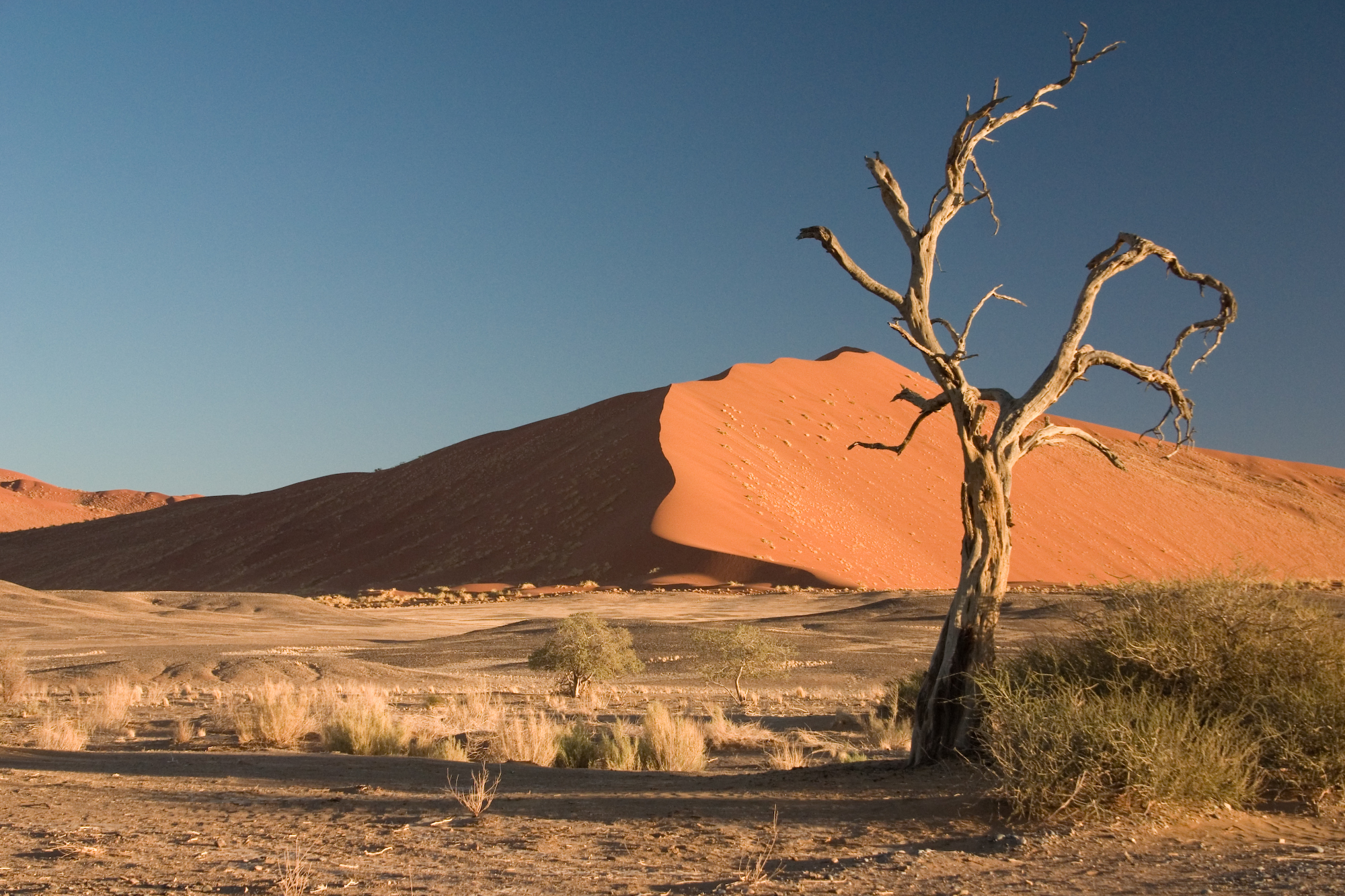
Acacia erioloba in the Namib Desert

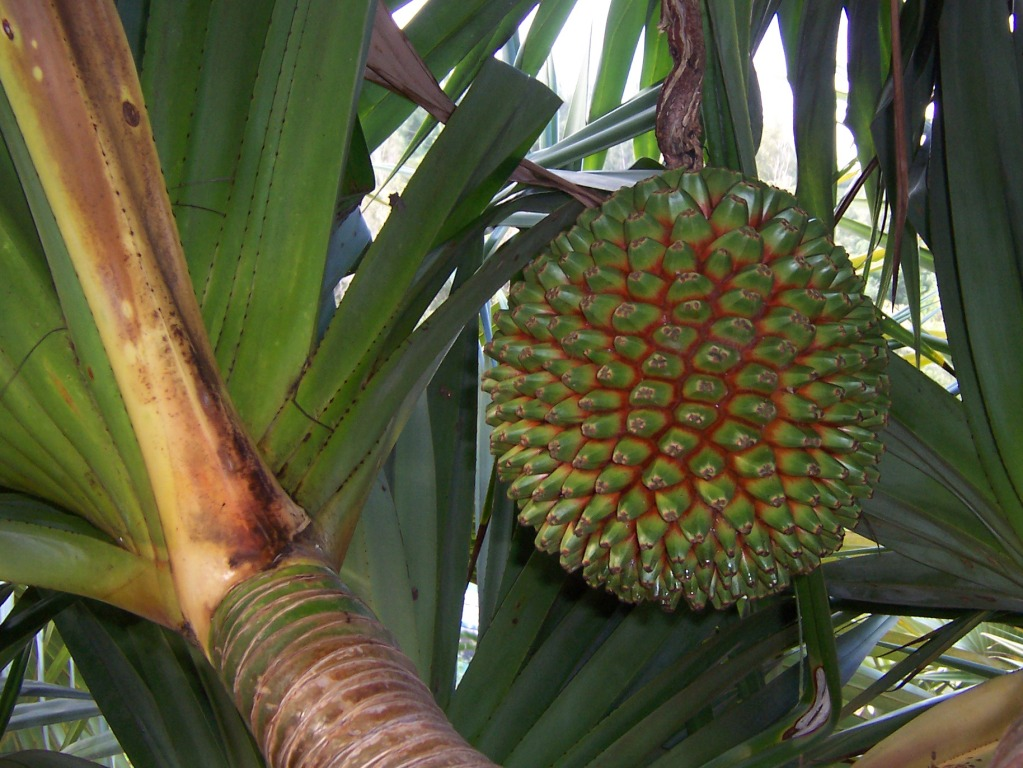
Pandanus utilis

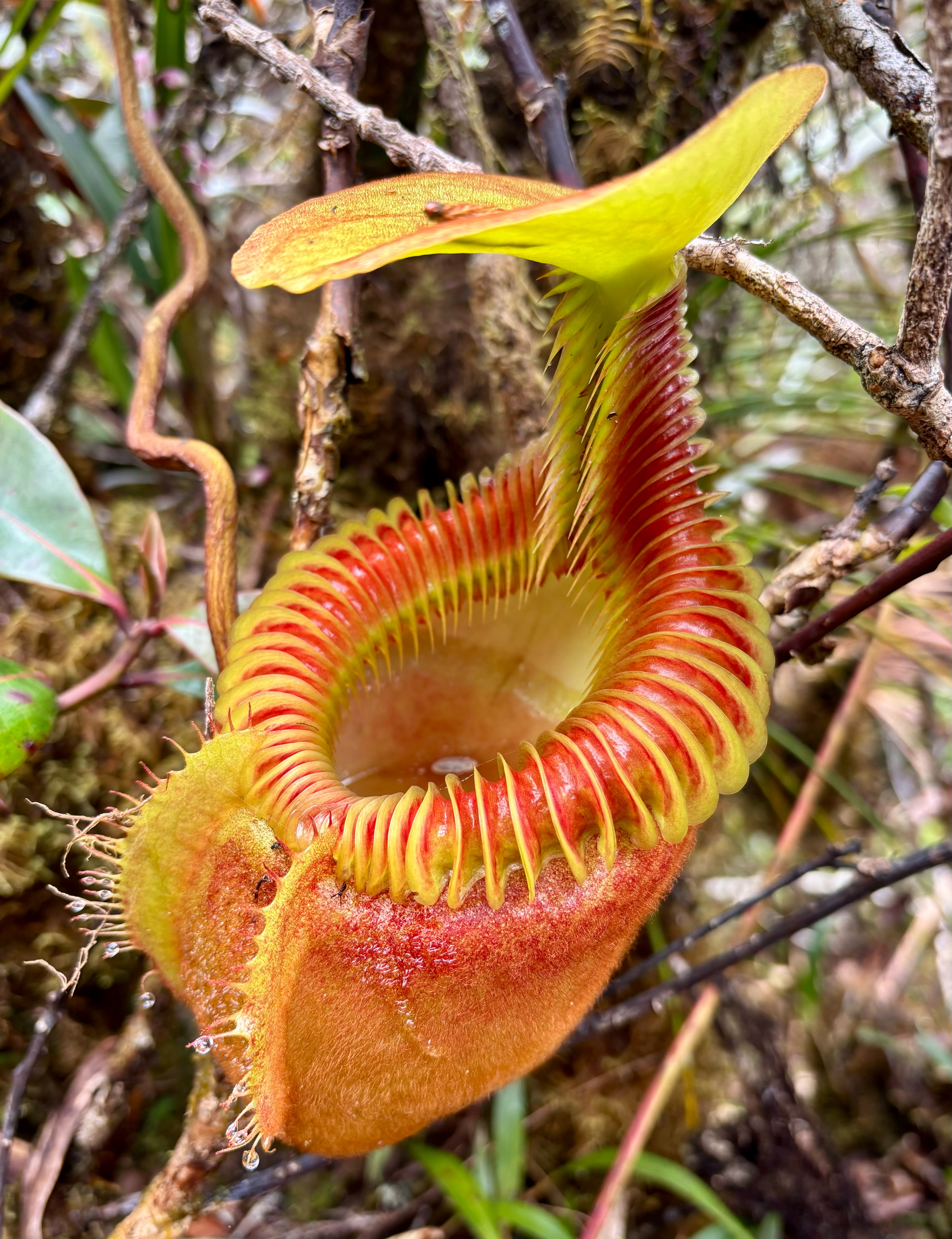
Nepenthes villosa

The Paleotropical kingdom (Paleotropis) is a floristic kingdom composed of the tropical areas of Africa, Asia and Oceania (excluding Australia and New Zealand), as proposed by Ronald Good and Armen Takhtajan. Part of its flora is inherited from the ancient supercontinent of Gondwana or exchanged later (e.g. Piperaceae with pantropical distribution and but few warm temperate representatives). These Gondwanan lineages are related to those in the Neotropical kingdom, composed of the tropical areas of Central and South America. Flora from the Paleotropical kingdom influenced the tropical flora of the Australian Kingdom. The kingdom is subdivided into five floristic subkingdoms according to Takhtajan (or three, according to Good) and about 13 floristic regions. In this article the floristic subkingdoms and regions are given as delineated by Takhtajan.

== Origin ==
A distinct community of vascular plants evolved millions of years ago, and are now found on several separate areas. Millions of years ago, the warmer and wetter areas supported a tropical adapted flora, including forests of podocarps and southern beech. They were a type of flora characteristic of parts of Gondwana but were present in equivalent ecological areas.

Over millions of years, these types of vegetation covered much of the tropics of Earth. Many species are today relicts of a type of vegetation disappeared, which originally covered much of the mainland of Africa, Madagascar, India, South America, Antarctica, Australia, North America, Europe, and other lands when their climate were more humid and warm. Although warm cloud forests disappeared during the glaciations, they re-colonized large areas every time the weather was favorable again. Most of the cloud forests are believed to have retreated and advanced during successive geological eras, and their species adapted to warm and wet gradually retreated and advanced, replaced by more cold-tolerant or drought-tolerant sclerophyll plant communities. Many of the existing species became extinct because they could not cross the barriers posed by new oceans, mountains and deserts, but others found refuge as species relict in coastal areas and Islands.

In the Carboniferous and Permian, New Zealand and New Caledonia were on the periphery of Gondwana, which included Africa, South America, Antarctica, India, New Zealand and Australia. Paleomagnetic data locate New Caledonia originally near the South Pole. In the Triassic and early Jurassic, Gondwana moved northward, warming the eastern margin. New Caledonia separated from Australia and New Zealand during the breakup of the super-continent, separating from Australia at the end of the Cretaceous (66 mya) and probably completing its separation from New Zealand in the mid-Miocene.

The ecological requirements of many of the species, are those of the laurel forest and like most of their counterparts laurifolia in the world, they are vigorous species with a great ability to populate the habitat that is conducive. The geographical isolation and special edaphic conditions helped to preserve it too.

Many members of the late Cretaceous–early Tertiary Gondwanan flora survived in islands and Coastal area's equable climate but were eliminated in mainland due to increasingly dry conditions. When the large landmasses became drier and with a harsher climate, this type of forest was reduced to those boundaries areas. Tasmania, Chile, New Zealand and New Caledonia share related species extinct in Australia mainland. The same case occurs in the Atlantic Macaronesia islands and Pacific Taiwan, Hainan, Jeju, Shikoku, Kyūshū, and Ryūkyū Islands. Although some remnants of archaic rich flora still persisted in their coastal mountains and shelter sites, their biodiversity were reduced. The location of Islands in the oceans moderated these climatic fluctuations, and maintained the relatively humid and mild climate which has allowed these communities to persist to the present day.

Plants have limited seed dispersal mobility away from the parent plant and consequently rely upon a variety of dispersal vectors to transport their propagules, including both abiotic and biotic vectors. Seeds can be dispersed away from the parent plant individually or collectively, as well as dispersed in both space and time. Tertiary vegetal species isolated on islands have led to vicariant species; genera and families extinct in the rest of the world have been preserved as island endemics.

For example, genera, Archeria in Ericaceae, or Wollemia in the family Araucariaceae, was known only from fossil remains before the discovery of the living species in 1994 in a temperate rainforest wilderness area of the Wollemi National Park in New South Wales, in a remote series of narrow, steep-sided sandstone gorges near Lithgow.

Fossils dating from before the Pleistocene glaciations show that species of Laurus were formerly distributed more widely around the Mediterranean and North Africa, isolated gave rise to Laurus azorica in Azores Islands, Laurus nobilis in mainland and Laurus novocanariensis in Canary Islands.

== Flora ==
The paleotropical flora is characterized by about 40 endemic plant families, the most famous being Nepenthaceae, Musaceae, Pandanaceae and Flagellariaceae, but including also Matoniaceae, Dipteridaceae, Stangeriaceae, Welwitschiaceae, Degeneriaceae, Rafflesiaceae, Didiereaceae, Didymelaceae, Ancistrocladaceae, Dioncophyllaceae, Scytopetalaceae (Scytopetalum), Medusagynaceae, Scyphostegiaceae (Scyphostegia), Sarcolaenaceae, Sphaerosepalaceae, Huaceae, Pandaceae, Crypteroniaceae, Duabangaceae, Strephonemataceae (Strephonema), Psiloxylaceae, Dirachmaceae, Phellinaceae, Lophopyxidaceae, Salvadoraceae, Medusandraceae, Mastixiaceae (Mastixia), Hoplestigmataceae (Hoplestigma) and Lowiaceae.

== Subdivisions ==
=== African subkingdom ===
10 endemic families (incl. Dioncophyllaceae, Pentadiplandraceae, Scytopetalaceae, Medusandraceae, Dirachmaceae, Kirkiaceae), many endemic genera.

1. Guineo-Congolian region
2. Usambara-Zululand region
3. Sudano-Zambezian region (including tropical Asia west of the Gulf of Khambhat)
4. Karoo-Namib region
5. St. Helena and Ascension region

=== Madagascan subkingdom ===
9 endemic families, more than 450 endemic genera, about 80% endemic species. It ceased to be influenced by the African flora in the Cretaceous, but underwent heavy influence of the Indian region's flora.

1. Madagascan region

=== Indo-Malesian subkingdom ===
11 endemic families (incl. Degeneriaceae, Barclayaceae, Mastixiaceae) and many endemic genera

1. Indian region
2. Indochinese region
3. Malesian region
4. Fijian region

=== Polynesian subkingdom ===
No endemic families, many endemic genera. The flora is mostly derivative from that of the Indo-Malesian subkingdom.

1. Polynesian region
2. Hawaiian region

=== Neocaledonian subkingdom ===
New Caledonia lies on the southernmost edge of the tropical zone, near the Tropic of Capricorn. This flora originated on the supercontinent Gondwana, and persist in current day New Guinea, Australia, New Zealand, New Caledonia and South America. This flora is fossil in Antarctica. The biodiversity of New Caledonia include several endemic families (incl. Amborellaceae, Strasburgeriaceae) and more than 130 endemic genera (incl. Exospermum and Zygogynum). The flora is partially shared with the Indo-Malesian subkingdom and the Australian Kingdom.

1. Neocaledonian region

== See also ==
- Flora of the Coral Sea Islands
- Flora of India – Plants native to India
- Flora of Indonesia – Plants of Indonesia
- Flora of the Marquesas Islands
- Flora of St Helena
