= Sterigmapetalum =

Scientific classification
- Kingdom: Plantae
- Clade: Tracheophytes
- Clade: Angiosperms
- Clade: Eudicots
- Clade: Rosids
- Order: Malpighiales
- Family: Rhizophoraceae
- Genus: Sterigmapetalum; Kuhlm.

Genus of plants

Sterigmapetalum is a genus of flowering plants belonging to the family Rhizophoraceae.

Its native range is Southern America.

Species:

- Sterigmapetalum chrysophyllum Aymard & Cuello
- Sterigmapetalum colombianum Monach.
- Sterigmapetalum exappendiculatum Steyerm. & Liesner
- Sterigmapetalum guianense Steyerm.
- Sterigmapetalum heterodoxum Steyerm. & Liesner
- Sterigmapetalum obovatum Kuhlm.
- Sterigmapetalum plumbeum Aymard & Cuello
- Sterigmapetalum resinosum Steyerm. & Liesner
- Sterigmapetalum tachirense Steyerm. & Liesner
