= Cyrillopsis =

Scientific classification
- Kingdom: Plantae
- Clade: Tracheophytes
- Clade: Angiosperms
- Clade: Eudicots
- Clade: Rosids
- Order: Malpighiales
- Family: Ixonanthaceae
- Genus: Cyrillopsis; Kuhlm.

Genus of flowering plants

Cyrillopsis is a genus of flowering plants belonging to the family Ixonanthaceae.

Its native range is northern South America and Brazil.

Species:

- Cyrillopsis micrantha (Steyerm.) P.E.Berry & N.Ramírez
- Cyrillopsis paraensis Kuhlm.
