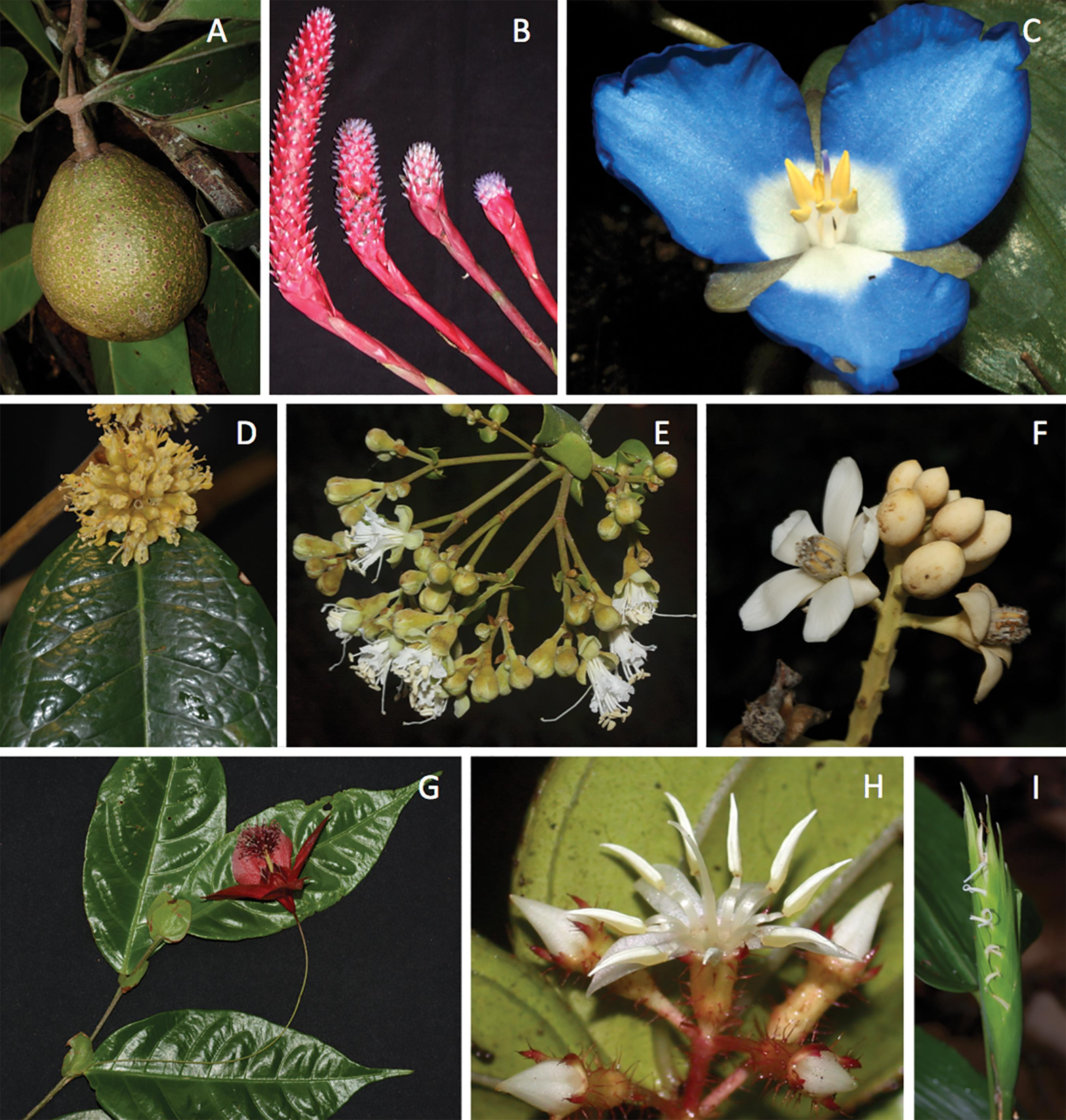
- Fig A showing Kuhlmanniodendron macrocarpum (Achariaceae)

Scientific classification
- Kingdom: Plantae
- Clade: Tracheophytes
- Clade: Angiosperms
- Clade: Eudicots
- Clade: Rosids
- Order: Malpighiales
- Family: Achariaceae
- Genus: Kuhlmanniodendron; Fiaschi & Groppo

= Kuhlmanniodendron =

Genus of plants

Kuhlmanniodendron is a genus of flowering plants belonging to the family Achariaceae.

It is native to eastern Brazil.

The genus name of Kuhlmanniodendron is in honour of João Geraldo Kuhlmann (1882–1958), a Brazilian botanist, the other part of the name dendron refers to the Greek word for tree. It was first described and published in Bot. J. Linn. Soc. Vol.157 on page 104 in 2008.

Known species, according to Kew:

- Kuhlmanniodendron apterocarpum (Kuhlm.) Fiaschi & Groppo
- Kuhlmanniodendron macrocarpum Groppo, Favaretto & Fiaschi
