= Spheneria =

Scientific classification
- Kingdom: Plantae
- Clade: Tracheophytes
- Clade: Angiosperms
- Clade: Monocots
- Clade: Commelinids
- Order: Poales
- Family: Poaceae
- Subfamily: Panicoideae
- Supertribe: Andropogonodae
- Tribe: Paspaleae
- Genus: Spheneria; Kuhlm.
- Species: S. kegelii

Binomial name
- Spheneria kegelii (C.Muell.) Pilg.

Synonyms
- Paspalum kegelii Müll.Hal.; Paspalum setifolium Döll; Anastrophus setifolius (Döll) Nash; Spheneria setifolia (Döll) Kuhlm.

Genus of grasses

Spheneria is a genus of plants in the grass family. The only known species is Spheneria kegelii, native to Guyana, Suriname, and Brazil (States of Pará, Mato Grosso, + Amazonas).
