= Merianthera =

Scientific classification
- Kingdom: Plantae
- Clade: Tracheophytes
- Clade: Angiosperms
- Clade: Eudicots
- Clade: Rosids
- Order: Myrtales
- Family: Melastomataceae
- Genus: Merianthera; Kuhlm.

Genus of flowering plants

Merianthera is a genus of flowering plants belonging to the family Melastomataceae.

Its native range is Eastern Brazil.

== Species ==
Species:

- Merianthera bullata R.Goldenb., Fraga & A.P.Fontana
- Merianthera burlemarxii Wurdack
- Merianthera calyptrata R.Goldenb., Bochorny & Fraga
- Merianthera eburnea R.Goldenb. & Fraga
- Merianthera parvifolia R.Goldenb., Fraga & A.P.Fontana
- Merianthera pulchra Kuhlm.
- Merianthera sipolisii (Glaz. & Cogn.) Wurdack
- Merianthera verrucosa R.Goldenb., Fraga & A.P.Fontana
