= Ochthocosmus =

Scientific classification
- Kingdom: Plantae
- Clade: Tracheophytes
- Clade: Angiosperms
- Clade: Eudicots
- Clade: Rosids
- Order: Malpighiales
- Family: Ixonanthaceae
- Genus: Ochthocosmus; Benth.

Genus of plants

Ochthocosmus is a genus of flowering plants belonging to the family Ixonanthaceae.

Its native range is Southern Tropical America, Western Central Tropical Africa.

== Species ==
Species:

- Ochthocosmus attenuatus Steyerm. & Luteyn
- Ochthocosmus barrae Hallier f.
- Ochthocosmus berryi Steyerm.
- Ochthocosmus floribundus Gleason
- Ochthocosmus gossweileri Exell & Mendonça
- Ochthocosmus longipedicellatus Steyerm. & Luteyn
- Ochthocosmus multiflorus Ducke
- Ochthocosmus roraimae Benth.
