= Clinostemon =

Scientific classification
- Kingdom: Plantae
- Clade: Tracheophytes
- Clade: Angiosperms
- Clade: Magnoliids
- Order: Laurales
- Family: Lauraceae
- Genus: Clinostemon; Kuhlm. & Samp.

Species
- Clinostemon maguireanus (C.K.Allen) H.Kurz; Clinostemon mahuba (A.Samp.) Kuhlm. & Samp.

Genus of trees

Clinostemon is a genus of flowering plants in the laurel family (Lauraceae). Plants of the genus are native to northern Brazil, Guyana, Peru, and Venezuela.

As of September 2026, Plants of the World Online accepts two species:

- Clinostemon maguireanus (C.K.Allen) H.Kurz
- Clinostemon mahuba (A.Samp.) Kuhlm. & Samp.
