= Flora of the Coral Sea Islands =

The Flora of the Coral Sea Islands consists of 16 families, 24 genera and 26 species. Five of these species are introduced and naturalised. The vegetation is mostly herbfields, although a few islands support shrubs and low forests.

The following plant taxa occur on the Coral Sea Islands:

| Taxon | Common name | Remarks |
|---|---|---|
| Abutilon asiaticum var. australiense | . | |
| Achranthes aspera | | |
| Heliotropium foertherianum | | |
| Boerhavia albiflora | | |
| Boerhavia glabrata | | |
| Calophyllum inophyllum | | |
| Canavalia rosea | | |
| Commicarpus insularum | | Recorded in 1979, but not in 1993 |
| Cordia subcordata | Tou | |
| Coronopus integrifolius | | Naturalised |
| Cynodon dactylon | | Naturalised |
| Digitaria ctenantha | | |
| Euphorbia cyathophora | | Naturalised |
| Ipomoea macrantha | | |
| Ipomoea pes-caprae subsp. brasiliensis | | |
| Lepturus repens | | |
| Pisonia grandis | | |
| Plumbago zeylanica | | |
| Portulaca oleracea | Common Purslane | Naturalised |
| Scaevola taccada | | |
| Sporobulus virginicus | | |
| Stenotaphrum micranthum | | |
| Thuarea involuta | | |
| Tribulus cistoides | | |
| Tridax procumbens | | Naturalised |
| Ximenia americana | | |
