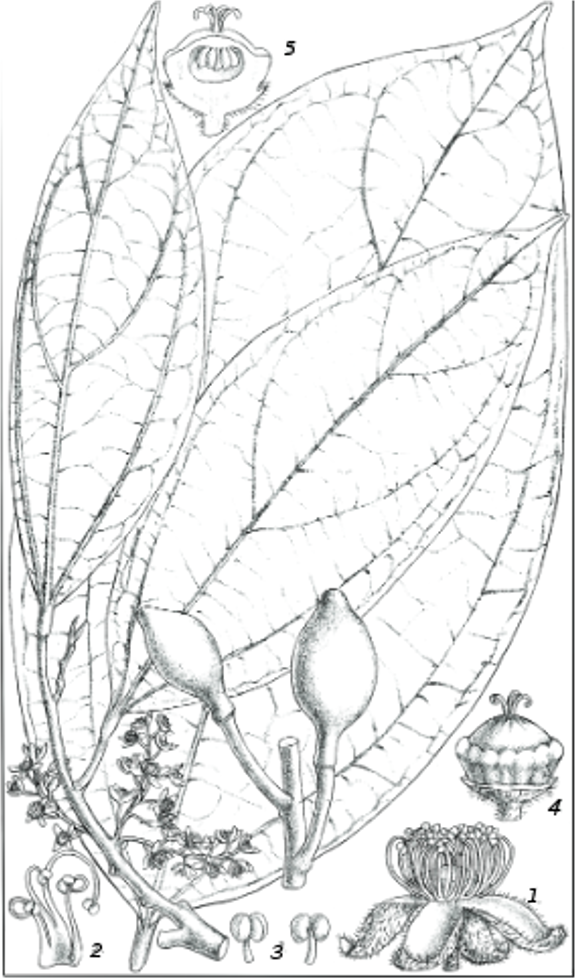
- Botanical illustration of Peridiscus lucidus

Scientific classification
- Kingdom: Plantae
- Clade: Tracheophytes
- Clade: Angiosperms
- Clade: Eudicots
- Order: Saxifragales
- Family: Peridiscaceae; Kuhlm.

Type genus
- Peridiscus Benth.

Genera
- Medusandra Brenan; Peridiscus Benth.; Soyauxia Oliv.; Whittonia Sandwith

= Peridiscaceae =

Family of flowering plants in the order Saxifragales

Peridiscaceae is a family of flowering plants in the order Saxifragales. Four genera comprise this family: Medusandra, Soyauxia, Peridiscus, and Whittonia., with a total of 12 known species. It has a disjunct distribution, with Peridiscus occurring in Venezuela and northern Brazil, Whittonia in Guyana, Medusandra in Cameroon, and Soyauxia in tropical West Africa. Whittonia is possibly extinct, being known from only one specimen collected below Kaieteur Falls in Guyana. In 2006, archeologists attempted to rediscover it, however, it proved unsuccessful.

The largest genus is Soyauxia, with about seven species. Medusandra has two species. Peridiscus and Whittonia each contain one species. The Peridiscaceae are small trees or erect shrubs of wet tropical forests.

It was not until 2009 that all four of the genera were united into a single family. Peridiscus and Whittonia are clearly close relatives. This pair, and the other two genera have long been considered anomalous, being variously classified by different authors.

== Description ==
The following description was created by combining descriptions of Medusandra and Peridiscus by John Hutchinson with descriptions of Soyauxia, Peridiscus, and Whittonia by Clemens Bayer.

Peridiscaceae are small trees or erect shrubs. The leaves are stipulate, alternate, and simple, with margins that are entire or remotely crenulate (Medusandra). The petiole is pulvinate, at its apex, sometimes obscurely so. The stipules are in the axils of the leaves, sometimes enclosing an axillary bud.

The inflorescence is a cluster of axillary racemes or spikes, the clusters often being reduced to a pair of racemes or to a single raceme. The flowers are bisexual and actinomorphic. The sepals are 4 to 7 in number, and free, that is, separate from each other. Medusandra and Soyauxia have five petals. Peridiscus and Whittonia have none.

Medusandra lacks a nectary disk and has five stamens, inserted opposite the petals, and alternating with five long, hairy staminodes. In the others, the stamens are numerous and arranged in a ring around the nectary disk. The anthers are tetrathecal in Medusandra and Soyauxia; bithecal in Peridiscus and Whittonia.

The perianth parts are attached below the ovary. The ovary is therefore superior, but appears half-inferior in Peridiscus because the ovary is embedded in the large, fleshy disk. The gynoecium consists of three or four carpels, united to form a unilocular ovary. The placentation is apical, with two ovules at the apex of each carpel. The ovary has a central column in Medusandra and Soyauxia. Each carpel bears a stylulus and these are well separated at the apex of the ovary.

The fruit is one-seeded; a capsule in Medusandra and Soyauxia; a drupe in Peridiscus and Whittonia.

== History ==
George Bentham established the genus Peridiscus in 1862, naming its only species Peridiscus lucidus. He placed it in a group which he called "Tribus Flacourtieae" and which later would be known as the family Flacourtiaceae. Bentham wrote no etymology for this name, but it is generally believed that the name refers to the fact that the stamens are attached along the outer edge of the nectary disk.

Daniel Oliver established the genus Soyauxia in 1880 for Soyauxia gabonensis, placing it in the family Passifloraceae. He named it for the German botanist and plant collector Hermann Soyaux, saying "Mons. Soyaux, now settled in the Gaboon, well deserves that his name should be associated with one of his interesting discoveries in that region".

The family Flacourtiaceae was, as Hermann Sleumer said, a fiction, and Peridiscus was, from the outset, one of its most doubtful members. Recognizing its distinctiveness, João Kuhlmann segregated it into its own family in 1947.

In 1952, John Brenan named and described Medusandra, erecting a new family, Medusandraceae to accommodate it. In 1953, Brenan transferred Soyauxia from Passifloraceae to Medusandraceae, but few others agreed with his classification. In 1954, John Hutchinson and John McEwen Dalziel followed Brenan's treatment in the second edition of their Flora of West Tropical Africa. Hutchinson, however, soon recanted, explaining in some detail why he thought that Medusandra and Soyauxia were not related.

In 1962, Noel Y. Sandwith named and described Whittonia. In an accompanying article, Charles Russell Metcalfe discussed its close relationship to Peridiscus. For four decades thereafter, Peridiscaceae was viewed as a family of uncertain taxonomic position, containing two genera.

In the year 2000, a DNA sequence for the rbcL gene of Whittonia was produced and used in a molecular phylogenetic study of the eudicots. This study placed Peridiscaceae in a clade with Elatinaceae and Malpighiaceae, a very surprising and unexpected result. On the basis of this phylogeny, the Angiosperm Phylogeny Group placed Peridiscaceae in Malpighiales when they published the APG II system of plant classification in 2003. It was soon found that the rbcL sequence for Whittonia was a chimera, formed by DNA from unidentified plants that had contaminated the sample. No subsequent attempt to extract DNA from Whittonia has been made.

In 2004, using DNA from Peridiscus, it was shown that Elatinaceae and Malpighiaceae are indeed sister families and that Peridiscaceae belong to Saxifragales. Medusandra and Soyauxia, meanwhile, were listed in APG II in an appendix entitled "TAXA OF UNCERTAIN POSITION".

DNA from Soyauxia was eventually obtained, and in 2007, it was shown that Soyauxia is most closely related to Peridiscus and, presumably, Whittonia. Since this result has a good morphological basis, Soyauxia was duly transferred to Peridiscaceae. This study also found strong statistical support for the inclusion of Peridiscaceae in Saxifragales, but no strong support for any particular position within that order.

In 2008, in a study employing a large amount of chloroplast DNA data, as well as some mitochondrial and nuclear DNA, it was shown that Peridiscaceae is sister to the rest of Saxifragales.

It had been suspected that Medusandra might belong somewhere in Malpighiales, but a phylogeny of that order, generated in 2009, placed Medusandra in Saxifragales. The authors had included Medusandra and a few other members of Saxifragales in their outgroup, finding strong support for a clade of [Medusandra + (Soyauxia + Peridiscus)]. When the APG III system was published in October 2009, Peridiscaceae was expanded to include Medusandra and Soyauxia. John Brenan, 57 years before, had been prescient in his perception of a relationship between Medusandra and Soyauxia.

== Phylogeny ==
The phylogeny is diagrammed as a phylogenetic tree below. The relationships shown are from Wurdack and Davis (2009) except for the position of Whittonia, for which no DNA sequences are known. Peridiscus and Whittonia are undoubtedly sister taxa due to their many shared morphological characters.

- Peridiscaceae
  - Medusandra
  - - Soyauxia
    - - Peridiscus
      - Whittonia

== Bibliography ==
- Angiosperm Phylogeny Group (1998), "An ordinal classification for the families of flowering plants", Annals of the Missouri Botanical Garden, 85 (4): 531–553, doi:10.2307/2992015, JSTOR 2992015
- Angiosperm Phylogeny Group II (2003), "An update of the Angiosperm Phylogeny Group classification for the orders and families of flowering plants: APG II", Botanical Journal of the Linnean Society, 141 (4), Bremer, B., K. Bremer, M.W. Chase, J.L. Reveal, D.E. Soltis, P.S. Soltis & P.F. Stevens: 399–436, doi:10.1046/j.1095-8339.2003.t01-1-00158.x
- Angiosperm Phylogeny Group III (2009), "An update of the Angiosperm Phylogeny Group classification for the orders and families of flowering plants: APG III", Botanical Journal of the Linnean Society, 161 (2), Bremer, B., K. Bremer, M.W. Chase, M.F. Fay, J.L. Reveal, D.E. Soltis, P.S. Soltis & P.F. Stevens: 105–121, doi:10.1111/j.1095-8339.2009.00996.x, hdl:10654/18083
- Angiosperm Phylogeny Group IV (2016). "An update of the Angiosperm Phylogeny Group classification for the orders and families of flowering plants: APG IV". Botanical Journal of the Linnean Society. 181 (1): 1–20. doi:10.1111/boj.12385.
- Aymard, Gerardo A.; Arellano, Henry (June 2018). "First Report of Peridiscaceae for the Vascular Flora of Colombia". Harvard Papers in Botany. 23 (1): 109–121. doi:10.3100/hpib.v23iss1.2018.n12. S2CID 198149581.
- Soltis, Douglas E.; Clayton, Joshua W.; Davis, Charles C.; Gitzendanner, Matthew A.; Cheek, Martin; Savolainen, Vincent; Amorim, André M.; Soltis, Pamela S. (2007). "Monophyly and Relationships of the Enigmatic Family Peridiscaceae" (PDF). Taxon. 56 (1): 65–73. doi:10.2307/25065736. ISSN 0040-0262. JSTOR 25065736. S2CID 10606740. Archived from the original (PDF) on 2020-02-18.

Websites

- Peridiscaceae At: Angiosperm Phylogeny Website At: Missoure Botanical Garden Website
- CRC World Dictionary of Plant Names: M-Q At: Hooker's Icones Plantarum
- Peridiscaceae in L. Watson and M.J. Dallwitz (1992 onwards). The families of flowering plants: descriptions, illustrations, identification, information retrieval.
- WFO (2019). "Peridiscaceae Kuhlm". World Flora Online.
