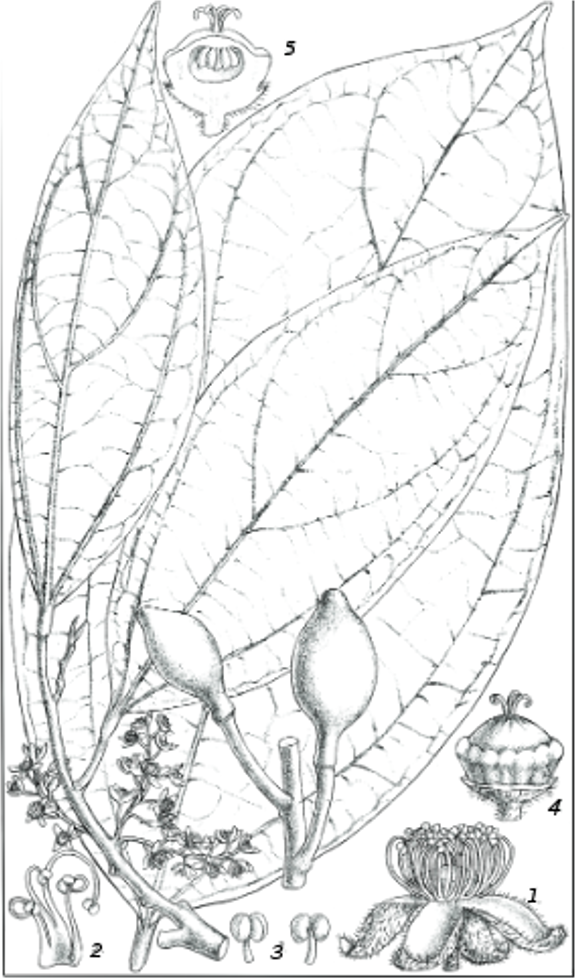
- Peridiscus lucidus

Scientific classification
- Kingdom: Plantae
- Clade: Tracheophytes
- Clade: Angiosperms
- Clade: Eudicots
- Order: Saxifragales
- Family: Peridiscaceae
- Genus: Peridiscus; Benth.
- Species: P. lucidus

Binomial name
- Peridiscus lucidus Benth.

= Peridiscus =

Monotypic genus of flowering plant

Peridiscus lucidus is a species of flowering plant, the only species in the genus Peridiscus, which is one of four genera within the family Peridiscaceae. It grows in Venezuela and northern Brazil, in evergreen, sometimes riverine forests. It was originally described by Bentham and Hooker in 1862. The taxonomic history of Peridiscus and of Peridiscaceae is complex, and has been resolved by molecular phylogenetic analysis.

== Description ==
Peridiscus lucidus is a tree with glabrous leaves; its flowers grow on elongated racemes. The flowers have pale green to yellow or white sepals (4–6). The stamens are inserted outside the lobulate disc and the ovary is glabrous and partly sunken in the disc. The fruit is subglobose and greenish, with a single seed.
