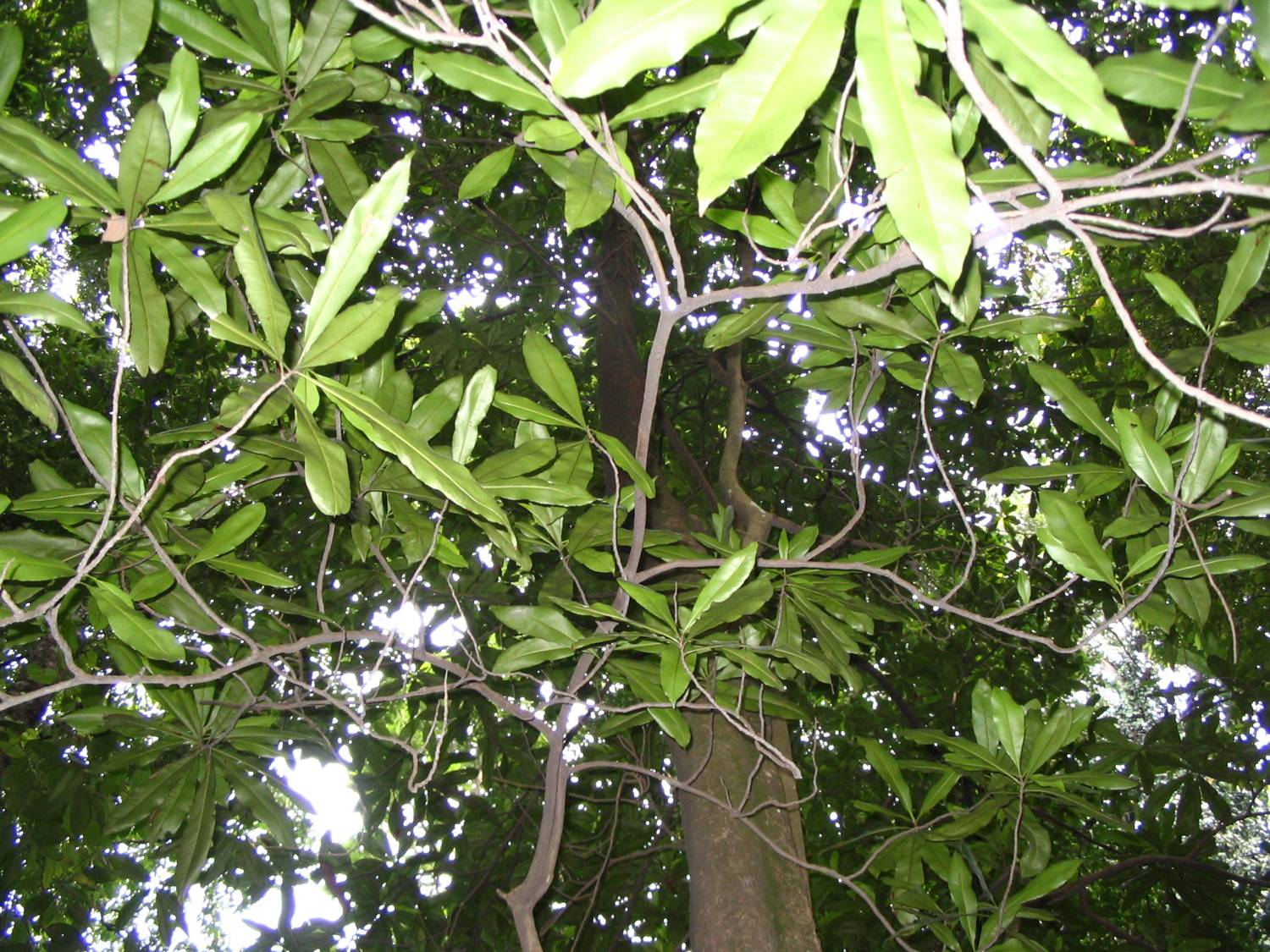
- Ixonanthes icosandra

Scientific classification
- Kingdom: Plantae
- Clade: Tracheophytes
- Clade: Angiosperms
- Clade: Eudicots
- Clade: Rosids
- Order: Malpighiales
- Family: Ixonanthaceae; Planch. ex Miq.

Genera
- Cyrillopsis; Ixonanthes; Ochthocosmus; Phyllocosmus

= Ixonanthaceae =

Family of flowering plants

Ixonanthaceae is a pantropical flowering plant family of trees or shrubs, consisting of about 30 species in 3 or 4 genera. It is a broadleaf evergreen.
