= Whittonia =

Scientific classification
- Kingdom: Plantae
- Clade: Embryophytes
- Clade: Tracheophytes
- Clade: Spermatophytes
- Clade: Angiosperms
- Clade: Eudicots
- Order: Saxifragales
- Family: Peridiscaceae
- Genus: Whittonia; Sandwith
- Species: W. guianensis

Binomial name
- Whittonia guianensis Sandwith

Species of flowering plant

Whittonia is a monotypic genus of flowering plants belonging to the family Peridiscaceae. It only contains one known species, Whittonia guianensis.

It is native to Guyana.

The genus name of Whittonia is in honour of Brian Alan Whitton (b. 1935), an English botanist at Durham University. The Latin specific epithet of guianensis means "of the Guianas" (an area of north eastern South America). Both the genus and the species were first described and published in Kew Bull. Vol.15 on page 468 (written 1961, publblished in 1962).
