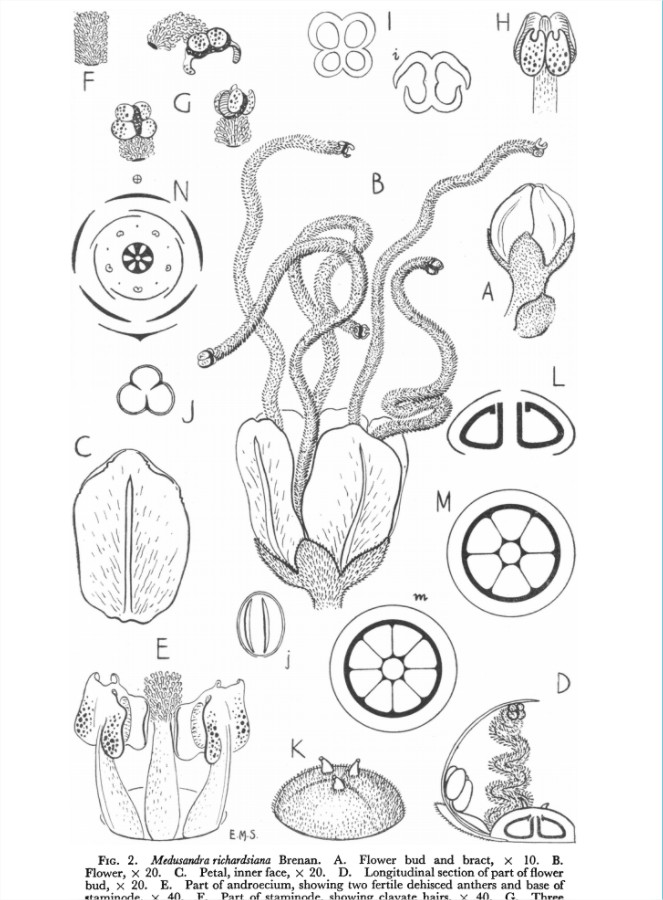
- Medusandra richardsiana

Scientific classification
- Kingdom: Plantae
- Clade: Tracheophytes
- Clade: Angiosperms
- Clade: Eudicots
- Order: Saxifragales
- Family: Peridiscaceae
- Genus: Medusandra; Brenan

Type species
- Medusandra richardsiana Brenan

Species
- Medusandra richardsiana; Medusandra mpomiana

= Medusandra =

Genus of flowering plants

Medusandra is a genus of flowering plants in the family Peridiscaceae. It has two species, Medusandra richardsiana and Medusandra mpomiana. M. richardsiana is the most common and well known. Both species are native to Cameroon and adjacent countries.

Medusandra was named by John Brenan in 1952. Brenan put Medusandra in its own family, Medusandraceae, and added Soyauxia to that family in 1953. Most authors, however, maintained Medusandraceae as a monogeneric family and put Soyauxia elsewhere. A detailed description of Medusandra was published by John Hutchinson in 1973.

When the APG II system was published by the Angiosperm Phylogeny Group in 2003, Medusandra and Soyauxia were listed in an appendix as "taxa of uncertain position". The first molecular phylogenetic study to include Medusandra appeared in 2009. It showed that Medusandra is sister to a clade consisting of Soyauxia, Peridiscus, and by implication, Whittonia. These three genera are in Peridiscaceae, and the authors, Kenneth Wurdack and Charles Davis, recommended that Medusandra be added to Peridiscaceae. When the APG III system was published in October 2009, Peridiscaceae was expanded to include Medusandra and Soyauxia.
