= Hermann Soyaux =

German botanist (1852–1928)

Hermann Soyaux (4 January 1852, Breslau – 1928, Brazil) was a German botanist and explorer.

== Biography ==
Soyaux was initially a horticulturalist and then studied botany in Berlin. The Deutsche Afrika Gesellschaft (German Africa Society) funded him as a botanist on the expedition of Paul Güssfeldt to the Kingdom of Loango. On the expedition, Soyaux traveled at the end of 1873 to the Loangoan coast in what is now Cabinda Province, where he joined Güssfeldt, Julius Falkenstein and Eduard Pechuël-Loesche. In 1875 Soyaux was commissioned to go to Angola, where he met Paul Pogge. When the expedition was disbanded in 1876, Soyaux returned in mid-1876 to Germany. In the years from 1876 to 1879 he published Der verlorene Weltteil (Berlin, 1876) and Aus Westafrika (2 vols., Leipzig, 1879). On behalf of the Hamburg trading house Carl Woermann, Soyaux went in 1879 to Gabon.

In 1885 he returned to Germany and until the beginning of 1888 he worked in Berlin as the head of the information office for the Deutsche Kolonialverein. F. A. Brockhaus AG published Soyaux's "Deutsche Arbeit in Afrika: Erfahrungen und Betrachtungen" (Leipzig, 1888).

In the spring of 1888 Soyaux went to Brazil on behalf of the Siedlungsgesellschaft Herman, a colonial land-developing company. He led the colony Bom Retiro in the province Rio Grande do Sul. In 1904 he was one of the founders of the Centro Econômico do Rio Grande do Sul. He then lived in Porto Alegre.

== Selected publications ==
- Der verloren Weltteil. 1876. (The lost part of the world)
- Aus Westafrika. F.A. Brockhaus. 1879; 2 vols. (From West Africa)
- Deutsche Arbeit in Afrika: Erfahrungen und Betrachtungen. 1888. (German work in Africa: experiences and considerations) 2010 edition. ISBN 1172271909.
