= List of Berberis and Mahonia species =

Berberis and Mahonia are two widespread and common members of the Berberidaceae, found in many countries. Botanists have for many years had no consensus on the classification, some preferring to treat the group as a single genus (Berberis), while others opt to separate the two groups into distinct genera. Therefore, many species have two scientific names, one in Berberis, the other in Mahonia, each used by botanists on one side of the debate.

A third generic name, Odostemon, can be found in older literature. It is considered by most authorities to be a rejected synonym for Mahonia.

This is an old argument not likely to be resolved soon, and certainly not here on Wikipedia. Our interest is in assisting readers find the web pages on the appropriate species, despite the dual nomenclature. Below are species accepted by The Plant List as members of one genus or the other, all alphabetized by specific epithet with links to synonyms in the other genus, if such a synonym exists. World Flora Online which replaced The Plant List (since 2013), only lists species of Berberis and places Mahonia Nutt as a synonym. They list up to 623 species.

== A ==
- Berberis actinacantha
- Berberis acutinervia
- Berberis aemulans
- Berberis aetnensis
- Berberis affinis
- Berberis agapatensis
- Berberis aggregata
- Berberis agricola
- Berberis ahrendtii
- Berberis aitchisonii
- Berberis albicans
- Berberis aldenhamensis
- Berberis alpicola
- Berberis alpina
- Berberis amabilis
- Berberis ambigua
- Berberis ambrozyana
- Berberis amoena
- Berberis amplectens - Mahonia amplectens
- Berberis amurensis
- Berberis andeana
- Berberis andreana
- Odostemon andrieuxii - Berberis andrieuxii
- Berberis angulosa
- Odostemon angustifolius - Berberis angustifolia - Mahonia angustifolia
- Berberis anhweiensis
- Berberis annaemariae
- Mahonia annamica - Berberis annamica
- Berberis approximata
- Berberis aquifolium - Mahonia aquifolium - Odostemon aquifolium
- Berberis argentinensis
- Berberis arguta
- Berberis aridocalida
- Berberis aristata
- Berberis aristatoserrulata
- Berberis aristeguietae
- Berberis aristoserrulata
- Berberis armata
- Berberis asiatica
- Berberis asmyana
- Berberis atrocarpa
- Berberis atroprasina
- Berberis atroviridiana
- Berberis aurahuacensis

== B ==
- Berberis baltistanica
- Berberis baluchistanica
- Berberis barandana
- Berberis barbeyana
- Berberis batangensis
- Mahonia bealei - Berberis bealei
- Berberis beaniana
- Berberis beauverdiana
- Berberis beesiana
- Berberis beijingensis
- Berberis benoistiana
- Berberis bergeriana
- Berberis bergmanniae
- Berberis bicolor
- Berberis × bidentata
- Mahonia bodinieri - Berberis bodinieri
- Berberis boliviana
- Mahonia borealis - Berberis borealis
- Berberis borealisinensis
- Berberis bracteata
- Mahonia bracteolata - Berberis bracteolata
- Berberis brandisiana
- Berberis × brevifolia
- Berberis brevipaniculata
- Mahonia breviracema - Berberis breviracema
- Berberis brevisepala
- Berberis brevissima
- Berberis brumalis
- Berberis buceronis
- Berberis buchananii
- Berberis bullata
- Berberis bumeliifolia
- Berberis burmanica
- Berberis bykoviana

== C ==
- Berberis cabrerae
- Berberis calcipratorum
- Berberis calliantha
- Berberis calliobotrys
- Berberis campos-portoi
- Berberis campylotropa
- Berberis canadensis
- Berberis candidula
- Mahonia cardiophylla
- Berberis carinata
- Berberis carolii
- Berberis carrikeri
- Berberis carupensis
- Berberis caudatifolia
- Berberis cavaleriei
- Berberis centiflora
- Berberis centifolia
- Berberis ceratophylla
- Berberis ceylanica
- Berberis chaquirensis
- Berberis chekiangensis
- Mahonia chiapensis - Berberis chiapensis
- Berberis chilensis
- Berberis chillacochensis
- Berberis chimboensis
- Berberis chinensis
- Berberis chingii
- Berberis chingshuiensis
- Berberis chirisigui
- Berberis chitria
- Berberis chochoco - Mahonia chochoco, Odostemon chochoco, Chrysodendron tinctorium
- Berberis chocontana
- Berberis chrysacantha
- Berberis chrysosphaera
- Berberis chunanensis
- Berberis ciliaris
- Berberis circumserrata
- Berberis citernei
- Berberis claussenii
- Berberis cliffortioides
- Berberis collettii
- Berberis colombiana
- Berberis comberi
- Berberis commutata
- Berberis concinna
- Berberis concolor
- Mahonia conferta - Berberis conferta
- Berberis congestiflora
- Berberis consanguinea
- Berberis consimilis
- Berberis contracta
- Berberis cooperi
- Berberis copahuensis
- Berberis coriacea
- Berberis coriaria
- Berberis corymbosa
- Berberis coxii
- Berberis crassilimba
- Berberis crataegina
- Berberis cretata
- Berberis cretica
- Berberis cuatrecasasii

== D ==
- Berberis daiana
- Berberis daochengensis
- Berberis darwinii - Mahonia knightii
- Berberis dasyclada
- Berberis dasystachya
- Berberis davidii
- Berberis dawoensis
- Berberis dealbata
- Mahonia decipiens - Berberis decipiens
- Berberis deinacantha
- Berberis delavayi
- Berberis densa
- Berberis densifolia
- Berberis derongensis
- Berberis diaphana
- Berberis diazii
- Berberis dictyoneura
- Berberis dictyophylla
- Berberis dictyota - Mahonia dictyota, Odostemon dictyota
- Berberis dielsiana
- Berberis discolor
- Berberis dolichobotrys
- Berberis dongchuanensis
- Berberis dryandriphylla
- Berberis dubia
- Mahonia duclouxiana - Berberis duclouxiana
- Berberis dumaniana
- Berberis dumicola
- Berberis duthieana

== E ==
- Berberis edentata
- Berberis edgeworthiana
- Mahonia ehrenbergii - Berberis ehrenbergii - Odostemon ehrenbergii
- Berberis elliotii
- Berberis empetrifolia
- Berberis engleriana
- Berberis erythroclada
- Mahonia eurybracteata - Berberis eurybracteata
- Mahonia eutriphylla - Berberis eutriphylla - Odostemon eutriphyllus
- Berberis everestiana

== F ==
- Berberis faberi
- Berberis fallaciosa
- Berberis fallax
- Berberis farinosa
- Berberis farreri
- Berberis faxoniana
- Berberis feddeana
- Berberis fendleri
- Berberis fengii
- Berberis ferdinandi-coburgii
- Berberis ferruginea
- Berberis fiebrigii
- Berberis flexuosa
- Berberis floribunda
- Mahonia fordii - Berberis fordii
- Berberis forrestii
- Mahonia fortunei - Berberis fortunei
- Berberis franchetiana
- Berberis francisci-ferdinandi
- Mahonia fremontii - Berberis fremontii - Odostemon fremontii
- Berberis fujianensis

== G ==
- Berberis gagnepainii
- Berberis gambleana
- Berberis ganpinensis
- Berberis garhwalensis
- Berberis gilgiana
- Berberis gilungensis
- Berberis giraldii
- Berberis glauca
- Mahonia glauca - Berberis standleyi
- Berberis glaucescens
- Berberis glaucocarpa
- Berberis glazioviana
- Berberis globosa
- Berberis glomerata
- Berberis goudotii
- Mahonia gracilipes -Berberis gracilipes
- Berberis gracilis - Mahonia gracilis, Odostemon gracilis
- Berberis graminea
- Berberis grandibracteata
- Berberis grandiflora
- Berberis grantii
- Berberis grevilleana
- Berberis griffithiana
- Berberis grodtmanniana
- Berberis guilache
- Berberis guizhouensis
- Berberis gyalaica

== H ==
- Berberis haematocarpa - Mahonia haematocarpa, Odostemon haematocarpus
- Berberis haenkeana
- Berberis hainesii
- Berberis hajirensis
- Berberis hallii
- Berberis hamiltoniana
- Mahonia hancockiana - Berberis hancockiana
- Berberis haoi
- Berberis harrisoniana
- Berberis hartwegii - Mahonia hartwegii, Odostemon hartwegii
- Berberis hayatana
- Berberis hazarica
- Berberis hemsleyana
- Berberis henryana
- Berberis hersii
- Berberis heteracantha
- Berberis heteropoda
- Berberis hieronymi
- Mahonia higginsiae - Berberis higginsiae
- Berberis hilliana
- Berberis himalaica
- Berberis hirtellipes
- Berberis hobsonii
- Berberis hochreutineriana
- Berberis holocraspedon
- Berberis holstii
- Berberis honanensis
- Berberis hookeri
- Berberis horrida
- Berberis hsuyunensis
- Berberis huanucensis
- Berberis huegeliana
- Berberis huertasii
- Berberis humbertiana
- Berberis humidoumbrosa
- Berberis hypericifolia
- Berberis hyperythra
- Berberis hypokerina
- Mahonia hypoleuca - Berberis nivea
- Berberis hypoxantha

== I ==
- Berberis iberica
- Berberis ignorata
- Berberis ilicifolia
- Mahonia ilicina - Berberis ilicina, Odostemon ilicinus
- Berberis iliensis
- Mahonia imbricata
- Berberis impedita
- Mahonia incerta - Odostemon incertus, Berberis incerta
- Berberis insignis
- Berberis insolita
- Berberis integerrima
- Berberis integripetala
- Berberis iteophylla

== J ==
- Berberis jaeschkeana
- Berberis jamesiana
- Berberis jamesonii
- Mahonia japonica - Berberis japonica, Ilex japonica
- Berberis jelskiana
- Berberis jiangxiensis - Mahonia jingxiensis
- Berberis jinfoshanensis
- Berberis jingguensis
- Berberis jinshajiangensis
- Berberis jiulongensis
- Berberis jobii
- Berberis johannis
- Berberis johnstonii - Mahonia johnstonii
- Berberis jujuyensis
- Berberis julianae

== K ==
- Berberis kangdingensis
- Berberis kansuensis
- Berberis karkaralensis
- Berberis kartanica
- Berberis kaschgarica
- Berberis kasgarica
- Berberis kashmirana
- Berberis kawakamii
- Berberis keissleriana
- Berberis kerriana
- Berberis khasiana
- Berberis khorasanica
- Berberis kleinii
- Mahonia knightii - Berberis darwinii
- Berberis koehneana
- Berberis kohistanensis
- Berberis kongboensis
- Berberis koreana
- Berberis kumaonensis
- Berberis kunawurensis
- Berberis kunmingensis

== L ==
- Berberis laidivo
- Berberis lambertii
- Berberis × lamondiae
- Berberis lanceolata - Mahonia lanceolata, Odostemon lanceolatus
- Berberis laojunshanensis
- Berberis lasioclema
- Berberis latifolia
- Berberis laurina
- Berberis leboensis
- Berberis lechleriana
- Berberis lecomtei
- Berberis lehmannii
- Berberis leichtensteinii
- Berberis lempergiana
- Berberis lepidifolia
- Mahonia leptodonta - Berberis leptodonta
- Berberis leucocarpa
- Berberis levis
- Berberis libanotica
- Berberis libertatis
- Berberis lijiangensis
- Berberis lilloana
- Berberis lindleyana
- Berberis linearifolia
- Berberis liophylla
- Berberis littoralis
- Berberis lobbiana
- Mahonia longibracteata - Berberis longibracteata
- Mahonia longipes - Berberis longipes - Odostemon longipes
- Berberis longispina
- Berberis loudonii
- Berberis loxensis
- Berberis lubrica
- Berberis ludlowii
- Berberis luhuoensis
- Berberis lutea
- Berberis lycium

== M ==
- Berberis macrosepala
- Berberis maderensis
- Berberis magnifolia
- Berberis malipoensis
- Berberis manipurana
- Berberis masafuerana
- Berberis medellinensis
- Berberis medogensis
- Berberis mekongensis
- Berberis meollacensis
- Berberis metapolyantha
- Berberis mianningensis
- Berberis michay
- Berberis micrantha
- Berberis microcarpa
- Berberis micropetala
- Berberis microphylla (not M. microphylla)
- Mahonia microphylla (not B. microphylla)
- Mahonia monyulensis - Berberis monyulensis
- Berberis microtricha
- Berberis mikuna
- Berberis minutiflora
- Berberis minzaensis
- Berberis miqueliana
- Berberis mitifolia
- Berberis monguiensis
- Berberis monosperma
- Berberis montana
- Berberis montevidensis
- Mahonia monyulensis - Berberis monyulensis
- Berberis morana
- Berberis moranensis - Mahonia moranensis, Odostemon fascicularis
- Berberis moritzii
- Berberis morrisonensis
- Berberis mouillacana
- Berberis mucrifolia
- Berberis mucuchiensis
- Berberis mucuchiesensis
- Mahonia muelleri - Berberis muelleri
- Berberis muiscarum
- Berberis muliensis
- Berberis multicaulis
- Berberis multiflora
- Berberis multiovula
- Berberis multiserrata

== N ==
- Mahonia napaulensis - Berberis napaulensis
- Berberis negeriana
- Berberis nemorosa
- Berberis nepalensis - Mahonia nepalensis
- Odostemon nervosus - Berberis nervosa - Mahonia nervosa
- Berberis nevadensis
- Odostemon nevinii - Berberis nevinii - Mahonia nevinii
- Berberis nigricans
- Berberis nilghiriensis
- Mahonia nitens - Berberis schochii
- Berberis nullinervis
- Berberis nummularia
- Berberis nutanticarpa
- Odostemon nutkanus - Mahonia aquifolium var. nutkana

== O ==
- Berberis oblanceifolia
- Berberis oblanceolata
- Berberis oblonga
- Berberis obovatifolia
- Mahonia oiwakensis - Berberis oiwakensis
- Berberis oritrepha
- Berberis orthobotrys
- Berberis osmastonii
- Berberis ovalifolia

== P ==
- Berberis pachyacantha
- Berberis pakistanica
- Berberis pallens
- Berberis pallida - Mahonia pallida, Odostemon pallidus
- Berberis paniculata
- Berberis papillifera
- Berberis papillosa
- Berberis parapruinosa
- Berberis paraspecta
- Berberis paravirescens
- Berberis parisepala
- Berberis parkeriana
- Berberis parviflora
- Berberis paucidentata
- Mahonia paucijuga - Berberis paucijuga
- Berberis pavoniana
- Mahonia paxii - Berberis paxii, Odostemon paxii
- Berberis pectinata
- Berberis pectinocraspedon
- Berberis peruviana
- Berberis petiolaris
- Berberis petiolata
- Berberis petriruizii
- Berberis petrogena
- Berberis phanera
- Berberis photiniifolia
- Berberis phyllacantha
- Berberis pichinchensis
- Berberis pimana
- Berberis pindilicensis
- Berberis pingbaensis
- Berberis pingbienensis
- Berberis pingjiangensis
- Berberis pingwuensis
- Mahonia pinifolia - Berberis pinifolia
- Mahonia pinnata - Berberis pinnata
- Berberis pinshanensis
- Berberis pinshanensis
- Berberis piperiana - Mahonia piperiana
- Berberis podophylla
- Berberis poiretii
- Berberis polyantha
- Mahonia polyodonta - Berberis polyodonta
- Berberis potaninii
- Berberis praecipua
- Berberis prattii
- Berberis prolifica
- Berberis pruinocarpa
- Berberis pruinosa
- Berberis pseudoamoena
- Berberis × pseudoilicifolia
- Berberis pseudothunbergii
- Berberis pseudotibetica
- Berberis pseudumbellata
- Berberis psiloclada
- Berberis psilopoda
- Berberis pubescens
- Berberis pulangensis
- Odostemon pumilus - Berberis pumila - Mahonia pumila
- Berberis purangensis
- Berberis purdomii
- Mahonia pycnophylla

== Q ==
- Berberis qiaojiaensis
- Berberis quelpaertensis
- Berberis quindiuensis
- Odostemon quinquefolius - Berberis quinquefolia - Mahonia quinquefolia

== R ==
- Berberis racemulosa
- Berberis rariflora
- Berberis rawatii
- Berberis rechingeri
- Berberis rectinervia
- Berberis reicheana
- Berberis repens - Mahonia repens
- Berberis replicata
- Berberis reticulata
- Berberis reticulinervis
- Mahonia retinervis - Berberis reticulinervia
- Berberis retusa
- Berberis rigida
- Berberis rigidifolia
- Berberis rockii
- Berberis rotunda
- Berberis rotundifolia
- Mahonia roxburghii - Berberis roxburghii
- Berberis royleana
- Berberis rufescens
- Berberis rusbyana
- Berberis ruscifolia
- Mahonia russellii - Berberis russellii

== S ==
- Berberis sabulicola
- Berberis salicaria
- Berberis samacana
- Berberis sanctipetrii
- Berberis sanei
- Berberis sanguinea
- Berberis sargentiana
- Berberis saxicola
- Berberis saxorum
- Berberis schwerinii
- Berberis schochii - Mahonia nitens
- Berberis sellowiana
- Berberis serratodentata
- Berberis setigrifolia
- Mahonia setosa - Berberis setosa
- Mahonia shenii - Berberis shenii
- Berberis shensiana
- Mahonia sheridaniana - Berberis sheridaniana
- Berberis sherriffii
- Berberis sibirica
- Berberis sichuanica
- Berberis sieboldii
- Berberis sikkimensis
- Berberis silva-taroucana
- Berberis silvicola
- Berberis simonsii
- Berberis solutiflora
- Berberis soulieana
- Berberis sphalera
- Berberis spinulosa
- Berberis spraguei
- Berberis spruceana
- Berberis standleyi - Mahonia glauca
- Berberis stearnii
- Berberis stenostachya
- Berberis stewartiana
- Berberis stiebritziana
- Berberis stolonifera
- Berberis stuebelii
- Berberis subacuminata
- Berberis suberecta
- Berberis subholophylla
- Mahonia subimbricata - Berberis subimbricata
- Berberis sublevis
- Berberis subsessiliflora
- Berberis sumapazana
- Odostemon swaseyi - Berberis swaseyi - Mahonia swaseyi

== T ==
- Berberis tabiensis
- Berberis taliensis
- Berberis tarokoensis
- Mahonia taronensis (not B. taronensis ) - Berberis tibetensis
- Berberis taronensis (not M. taronensis )
- Berberis taylorii
- Berberis telomaica
- Berberis temolaica
- Odostemon tenuifolius - Berberis tenuifolia, Mahonia tenuifolia
- Berberis tenuipedicellata
- Berberis thibetica
- Berberis thomsoniana
- Berberis thunbergii
- Berberis tianbaoshanensis
- Berberis tianshuiensis
- Berberis tibetensis - Mahonia taronensis
- Berberis tinctoria
- Berberis tischleri
- Berberis tolimensis
- Berberis tomentosa
- Berberis tomentulosa
- Berberis triacanthophora
- Berberis trichiata
- Berberis trichohaematoides
- Berberis trifolia - Odostemon trifolius, Mahonia trifolia
- Mahonia trifoliolata - Berberis trifoliolata - Odostemon trifoliolatus
- Berberis trigona
- Berberis truxillensis
- Berberis tsangpoensis
- Berberis tsarica
- Berberis tsarongensis
- Berberis tschonoskyana
- Berberis tsienii
- Berberis turcomanica

== U ==
- Berberis ulicina
- Berberis umbellata
- Berberis umbratica
- Berberis uniflora
- Berberis uribei

== V ==
- Berberis valdiviana
- Berberis valenzuelae
- Berberis valida
- Berberis validisepala
- Berberis vallensis
- Berberis veitchii
- Berberis venusta
- Berberis vernae
- Berberis vernalis
- Berberis verruculosa
- Berberis verschaffeltii
- Berberis verticillata
- Berberis victoriana
- Berberis vinifera
- Berberis virescens
- Berberis virgata
- Berberis virgetorum
- Berberis vitellina
- Berberis vulgaris

== W ==
- Berberis wallichiana
- Berberis walteriana
- Berberis wangii
- Berberis wanhuashanensis
- Berberis wardii
- Berberis warscewiczii
- Berberis wazaristanica
- Berberis weberbaueri
- Berberis weddellii
- Berberis weiningensis
- Berberis weisiensis
- Berberis weixinensis
- Berberis wettsteiniana
- Berberis wightiana
- Odostemon wilcoxii - Berberis wilcoxii
- Berberis wilsoniae
- Berberis woomungensis
- Berberis wuliangshanensis
- Berberis wuyiensis

== X ==
- Berberis xanthoclada
- Berberis xanthophlaea
- Berberis xanthoxylon
- Berberis xinganensis
- Berberis xingwenensis

== Y ==
- Berberis yui
- Berberis yunnanensis

== Z ==
- Berberis zanlanscianensis
- Berberis zayulana
- Berberis ziaratensis
- Mahonia zimapana - Odostemon zimapanus, Berberis zimapana
- Berberis ziyunensis
