= Berberis angustifolia =

Scientific classification
- Kingdom: Plantae
- Clade: Tracheophytes
- Clade: Angiosperms
- Clade: Eudicots
- Order: Ranunculales
- Family: Berberidaceae
- Genus: Berberis
- Species: B. angustifolia

Binomial name
- Berberis angustifolia Hartw. ex Benth. 1840, not Roxb. 1832 (syn of Berberis lycium Royle)

Synonyms
- Mahonia angustifolia (Hartw. ex Benth.) Fedde; Odostemon angustifolius (Hartw. ex Benth.) Standl.

Species of shrub

Berberis angustifolia is a shrub in the family Berberidaceae, first described as a species in 1840.

This is an uncommon species, endemic to Mexico within the State of Hidalgo.
