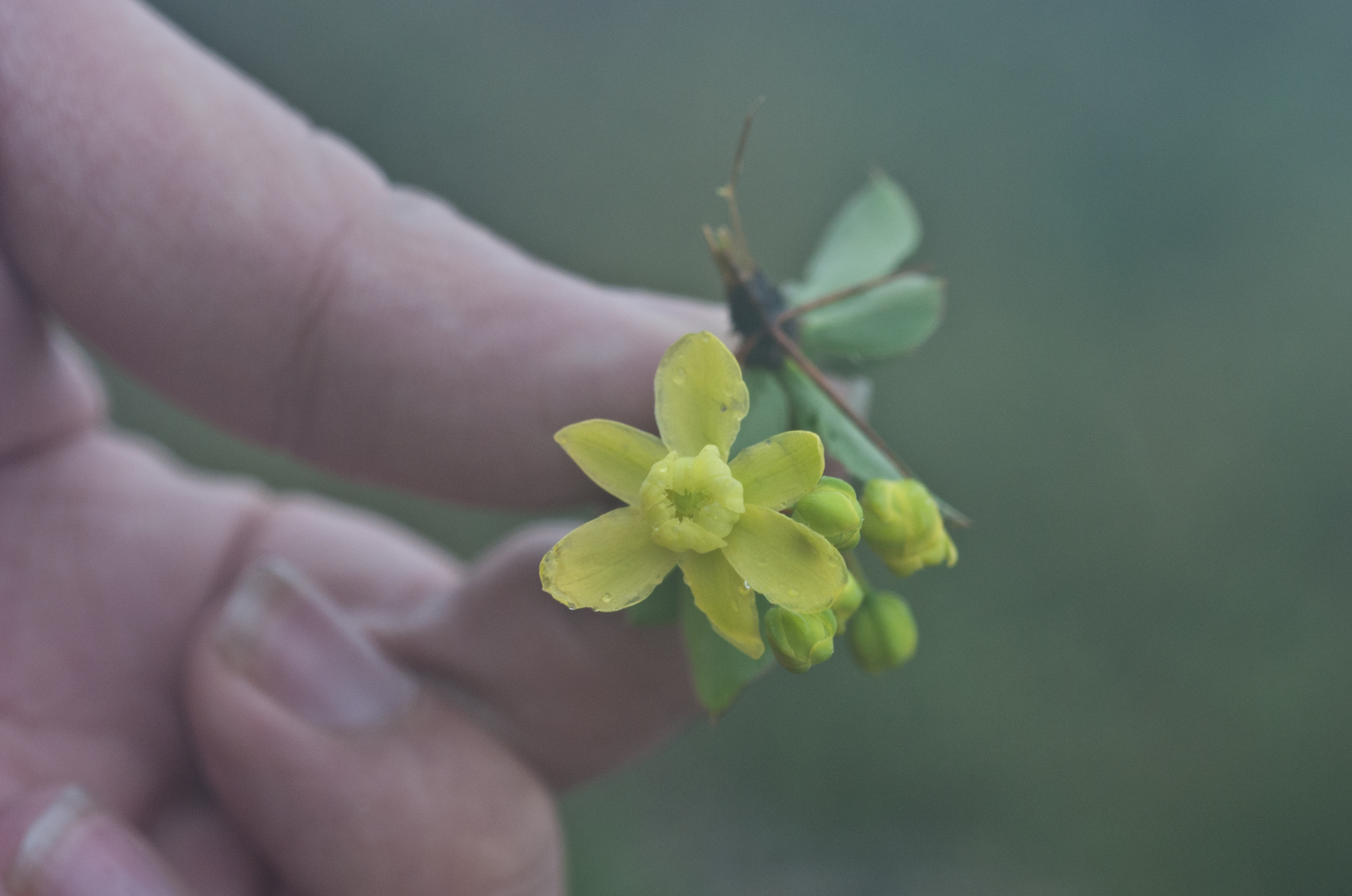

Scientific classification
- Kingdom: Plantae
- Clade: Tracheophytes
- Clade: Angiosperms
- Clade: Eudicots
- Order: Ranunculales
- Family: Berberidaceae
- Genus: Berberis
- Species: B. morrisonensis

Binomial name
- Berberis morrisonensis Hayata, 1911

= Berberis morrisonensis =

Species of shrub

Berberis morrisonensis, commonly known as Yushan barberry (Chinese:玉山小檗) or red fruit barberry (Chinese:红果小蘖、赤果小蘖) is a perennial deciduous shrub belonging to the genus Berberis and endemic to Taiwan.

== Distribution ==
It is located in the high-altitude mountain area above 3,000 meters in Taiwan and is distributed in the Xueshan Range, Central Mountain Range, and Yushan Range. However, the Central Mountain Range still dominates. The deciduous shrubs are distributed in the margins of high-altitude forests in Taiwan or in high-altitude forest borders. It is a slightly shade-loving species.

== Characteristics ==
It is a perennial deciduous shrub that grows in open areas, forests, arrow bamboo grove, or cuttings with good light transmission. The plant height is about 1 meter and there are three small thorns on the stem. Leaves 8–10 together, papery narrowly obovate to oblanceolate, leaf about 1.5–2.5 cm in length, and 0.5–1 cm in width. The leaf margins are sparsely sharply serrate, and the leaves on both sides are of the same color and hairless, but sometimes the lower half of the leaves will be pale green with obvious veins. Yellow long elliptic flowers, 3-6 bunches clustered in leaf axils, short panicles; pedicels 2.5–3 cm long; outer sepals long-ovate, about 3.5 cm long, 1.5 cm wide, and inner sepals 6 cm long, 3 cm wide; petals are elliptic, 5–6 cm long, 3-3.5 cm wide; ovules approximately 4-9. Red round spherical berries, approximately 1 cm long. Every year from the end of April to May in late spring and early summer is the budding period. Fl. Jun-Jul, Fr. Sep-Oct, leaves falling from November to December, and entering dormancy during the winter.
