= Berberis bracteolata =

Scientific classification
- Kingdom: Plantae
- Clade: Tracheophytes
- Clade: Angiosperms
- Clade: Eudicots
- Order: Ranunculales
- Family: Berberidaceae
- Genus: Berberis
- Species: B. bracteolata

Binomial name
- Berberis bracteolata (Takeda) Laferr.

Synonyms
- Berberis bracteolata var. zhongdianensis (S.Y.Bao) Laferr.; Berberis caesia (C.K.Schneid.) Laferr.; Mahonia bracteolata Takeda; Mahonia bracteolata var. zhongdianensis S.Y.Bao; Mahonia caesia C.K.Schneid.

Species of shrub

Berberis bracteolata is a shrub in the Berberidaceae described as a species in 1917. It is endemic to China, known from Sichuan and Yunnan Provinces.

== Taxonomy ==
Berberis bracteolata was initially scientifically described and named Mahonia bracteolata by Hisayoshi Takeda. In 1997 a paper was published by Joseph Edward Laferrière arguing for moving it and other species out of genus Mahonia to genus Berberis that has since become the most commonly accepted classification.
