= Berberis andrieuxii =

Scientific classification
- Kingdom: Plantae
- Clade: Tracheophytes
- Clade: Angiosperms
- Clade: Eudicots
- Order: Ranunculales
- Family: Berberidaceae
- Genus: Berberis
- Species: B. andrieuxii

Binomial name
- Berberis andrieuxii Hook. & Arn. 1838, not Mahonia andrieuxii Fedde 1901

Synonyms
- Odostemon andrieuxii (Hook. & Arn.) Standl.

Species of shrub

Berberis andrieuxii is a shrub in the Berberidaceae described as a species in 1838. It is endemic to the State of Oaxaca in southern Mexico.
