= Berberis quinquefolia =

Scientific classification
- Kingdom: Plantae
- Clade: Tracheophytes
- Clade: Angiosperms
- Clade: Eudicots
- Order: Ranunculales
- Family: Berberidaceae
- Genus: Berberis
- Species: B. quinquefolia

Binomial name
- Berberis quinquefolia (Standl.) Marroq. & Laferr.

Synonyms
- Mahonia quinquefolia (Standl.) Standl.; Odostemon quinquefolius Standl.

Species of shrub

Berberis quinquefolia is a shrub in the family Berberidaceae, first described as a species in 1918. The species is endemic to Mexico, reported from the States of Puebla and Durango.
