= Berberis ferdinandi-coburgii =

Conservation status
- Endangered (IUCN 3.1)

Scientific classification
- Kingdom: Plantae
- Clade: Tracheophytes
- Clade: Angiosperms
- Clade: Eudicots
- Order: Ranunculales
- Family: Berberidaceae
- Genus: Berberis
- Species: B. ferdinandi-coburgii

Binomial name
- Berberis ferdinandi-coburgii C.K.Schneid.

Synonyms
- Berberis ferdinandi-coburgii var. vernalis C.K.Schneid.; Berberis iteophylla C.Y.Wu ex S.Y.Bao; Berberis pectinocraspedon C.Y.Wu ex S.Y.Bao; Berberis pingbienensis S.Y.Bao; Berberis vernalis (C.K.Schneid.) D.F.Chamb. & C.M.Hu

Species of shrub

Berberis iteophylla is a species of flowering plant in the family Berberidaceae. It is a shrub native to central and southern Yunnan in southern China and to northern Vietnam.

The species was first described by Camillo Karl Schneider in 1913.
