= Berberis piperiana =

Scientific classification
- Kingdom: Plantae
- Clade: Tracheophytes
- Clade: Angiosperms
- Clade: Eudicots
- Order: Ranunculales
- Family: Berberidaceae
- Genus: Berberis
- Species: B. piperiana

Binomial name
- Berberis piperiana (Abrams) McMinn

Synonyms
- Mahonia piperiana Abrams

Species of shrub

Berberis piperiana is a shrub native to the mountains of northern California and southwestern Oregon. It is found in open and wooded slopes at elevations of 900–1,700 m (3,000–5,600 ft).

Berberis piperiana can attain a height of up to 80 cm (31 in). Leaves are evergreen, pinnately compound with 5–9 leaflets. Berries are dark blue and waxy. The species is related to the more common Oregon-grape, B. aquifolium, but distinguished by its shorter stature and broader leaflets.

The compound leaves place this species in the group sometimes segregated as the genus Mahonia.
