= Berberis moranensis =

Conservation status
- Least Concern (IUCN 3.1)

Scientific classification
- Kingdom: Plantae
- Clade: Tracheophytes
- Clade: Angiosperms
- Clade: Eudicots
- Order: Ranunculales
- Family: Berberidaceae
- Genus: Berberis
- Species: B. moranensis

Binomial name
- Berberis moranensis Hebenstr. & Ludw. ex Schult. & Schult.f.

Synonyms
- Berberis pinnata Kunth; Berberis pinnata Sessé & Moc.; Mahonia pinnata Kunth; Mahonia moranensis (Schult. & Schult.f) I.M. Johnstone; Odostemon fascicularis (DC.) Abrams; Mahonia fascicularis DC.; Berberis fascicularis (DC.) Sims

Species of shrub

Berberis moranensis is a shrub in the genus Berberis in the family Berberidaceae. Because of its compound leaves, some botanists place it in the genus Mahonia. It is native to forested regions of the mountains of Mexico from Sinaloa and Guanajuato to Oaxaca. Berberis moranensis has thick waxy leaves, yellow flowers, and purple berries. This species is closely related to Berberis pimana J.E. Laferr. & J.S. Marr.
