= Berberis hancockiana =

Scientific classification
- Kingdom: Plantae
- Clade: Tracheophytes
- Clade: Angiosperms
- Clade: Eudicots
- Order: Ranunculales
- Family: Berberidaceae
- Genus: Berberis
- Species: B. hancockiana

Binomial name
- Berberis hancockiana (T.S.Ying) Laferr.

Synonyms
- Mahonia hancockiana Takeda

Species of flowering plant

Berberis hancockiana is a species of flowering plant in the family Berberidaceae, first described in 1917. It is endemic to Yunnan Province in southwestern China.

== Taxonomy ==
Berberis hancockiana was initially scientifically described and named by Tsun Shen Ying as Mahonia hancockiana. A paper was published by Joseph Edward Laferrière in 1997 summarizing the arguments for Mahonia being more properly classified as a synonym of Berberis included Berberis hancockiana. As of 2023 this is the most common classification by botanists.
