= Berberis amoena =

Scientific classification
- Kingdom: Plantae
- Clade: Tracheophytes
- Clade: Angiosperms
- Clade: Eudicots
- Order: Ranunculales
- Family: Berberidaceae
- Genus: Berberis
- Species: B. amoena

Binomial name
- Berberis amoena Dunn

Synonyms
- Berberis amoena var. moloensis Ahrendt; Berberis amoena var. umbelliflora Ahrendt; Berberis elegans (Franch.) C.K.Schneid. 1905, illegitimate homonym, not K.Koch 1869 nor H.Léveille 1904.; Berberis leptoclada Diels; Berberis schneideri Rehder; Berberis sinensis var. elegans Franch.

Species of shrub

Berberis amoena is a shrub native to the Sichuan and Yunnan provinces of China. It is found at elevations of 1600–3100 m.

The species was initially described in 1905 and given the name Berberis elegans. It was later discovered that this name had already been used twice before, so the plant was renamed Berberis amoena in 1911.

Berberis amoena is a deciduous shrub up to 100 cm tall, with spines up to 12 mm long along the smaller branches. Leaves are elliptical, up to 16 mm long. Flowers are borne in groups of 4–8. Berries are red and oblong, growing up to 6 mm long.
