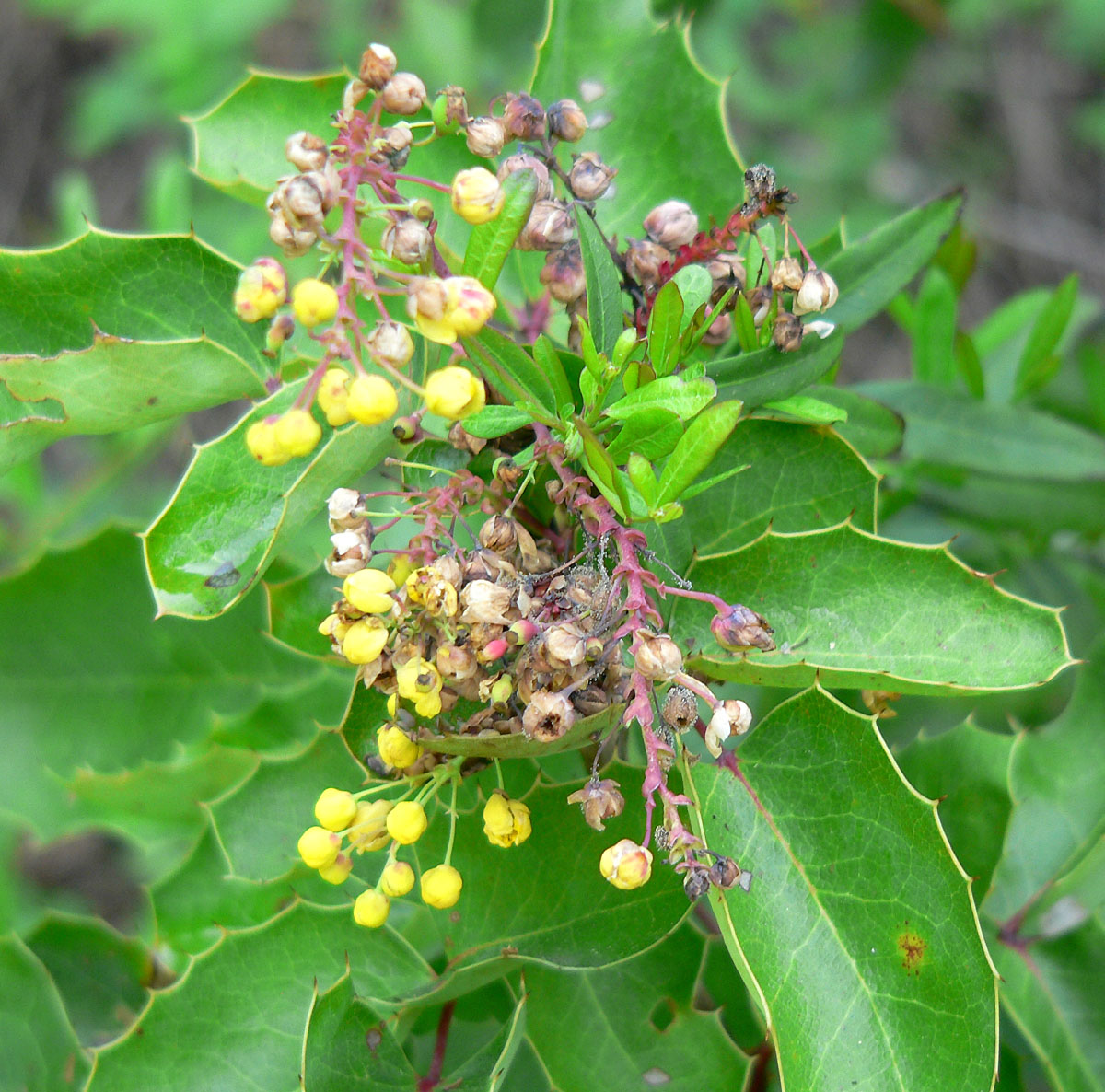

Scientific classification
- Kingdom: Plantae
- Clade: Tracheophytes
- Clade: Angiosperms
- Clade: Eudicots
- Order: Ranunculales
- Family: Berberidaceae
- Genus: Berberis
- Species: B. amplectens

Binomial name
- Berberis amplectens (Eastwood) L. C. Wheeler

Synonyms
- Mahonia amplectens Eastw.

= Berberis amplectens =

Species of plant

Berberis amplectens is a rare species of shrubs endemic to the Peninsular Ranges of southern California, east of San Diego.

== Description ==
It is an evergreen shrub up to 1.2 m (4 feet tall), with compound leaves and dark blue berries. It can be distinguished from other species in the genus by having numerous teeth along the leaf margins, as many as 15 per leaflet.

The compound leaves place this species in the group sometimes segregated as the genus Mahonia.
