= Berberis subimbricata =

Scientific classification
- Kingdom: Plantae
- Clade: Tracheophytes
- Clade: Angiosperms
- Clade: Eudicots
- Order: Ranunculales
- Family: Berberidaceae
- Genus: Berberis
- Species: B. subimbricata

Binomial name
- Berberis subimbricata (Chun & F.Chun) Laferr.

Synonyms
- Mahonia subimbricata Chun & F.Chun (1948)

Species of shrub

Berberis subimbricata is a shrub in the Berberidaceae described as a species in 1948. It is endemic to China, known from Guangxi and Yunnan Provinces.

== Taxonomy ==
Berberis subimbricata was initially scientifically described and named Mahonia subimbricata by Woon Young Chun (Huan-Yong Chen, 陈焕镛, 1890–1971) and Faith Chun (Shu Chen). A paper published by Joseph Edward Laferrière in 1997 summarized the arguments for Mahonia being more properly classified as a synonym of Berberis renaming it Berberis subimbricata. As of 2023 this is the most common classification by botanists.
