= Berberis aemulans =

Scientific classification
- Kingdom: Plantae
- Clade: Tracheophytes
- Clade: Angiosperms
- Clade: Eudicots
- Order: Ranunculales
- Family: Berberidaceae
- Genus: Berberis
- Species: B. aemulans

Binomial name
- Berberis aemulans C.K. Schneid.

Species of shrub

Berberis aemulans is a shrub endemic to the region of Sichuan in southern China. It grows there in thickets and on slopes at elevations of 2900–3200 m.

Berberis aemulans is a deciduous shrub up to 2 m tall, with spines along the branches. Leaves are simple, elliptical to ovate, up to 4 cm long, lighter in color on the underside because of a waxy layer. Flowers are in simple racemes of only a few flowers. Berries egg-shaped, orange, up to 16 mm long.
