= Berberis fordii =

Scientific classification
- Kingdom: Plantae
- Clade: Tracheophytes
- Clade: Angiosperms
- Clade: Eudicots
- Order: Ranunculales
- Family: Berberidaceae
- Genus: Berberis
- Species: B. fordii

Binomial name
- Berberis fordii (C.K.Schneid.) Laferr.

Synonyms
- Mahonia fordii C.K.Schneid.

Species of shrub

Berberis fordii is a species of shrub in the Berberidaceae described as a species in 1913. It is endemic to China, found in Chongqing and Guangdong Provinces.

== Taxonomy ==
Berberis fordii was initially scientifically described and named Mahonia fordii by Camillo Karl Schneider. A paper was published by Joseph Edward Laferrière in 1997 summarized the arguments for reclassifying moving it and other species of genus Mahonia to be part of genus Berberis. As of 2023 this is the most commonly accepted classification.
