= Berberis lanceolata =

Scientific classification
- Kingdom: Plantae
- Clade: Tracheophytes
- Clade: Angiosperms
- Clade: Eudicots
- Order: Ranunculales
- Family: Berberidaceae
- Genus: Berberis
- Species: B. lanceolata

Binomial name
- Berberis lanceolata Benth.

Synonyms
- Mahonia lanceolata (Benth.) Fedde; Odostemon lanceolatus (Benth.) Standl.

Species of shrub

Berberis lanceolata is a shrub in the Berberidaceae described as a species in 1840. It is endemic to Mexico, found in the States of Hidalgo, Oaxaca, Veracruz, and Puebla.
