= Berberis argentinensis =

Scientific classification
- Kingdom: Plantae
- Clade: Tracheophytes
- Clade: Angiosperms
- Clade: Eudicots
- Order: Ranunculales
- Family: Berberidaceae
- Genus: Berberis
- Species: B. argentinensis

Binomial name
- Berberis argentinensis Hosseus

Species of shrub

Berberis argentinensis is a shrub in the family Berberidaceae, first described as a species in 1921. It is native to Bolivia (Tarija and La Paz regions) and Argentina (Tucumán and La Rioja provinces).
