= Berberis everestiana =

Scientific classification
- Kingdom: Plantae
- Clade: Tracheophytes
- Clade: Angiosperms
- Clade: Eudicots
- Order: Ranunculales
- Family: Berberidaceae
- Genus: Berberis
- Species: B. everestiana

Binomial name
- Berberis everestiana Ahrendt

Species of shrub

Berberis everestiana is a shrub in the family Berberidaceae described as a species in 1961. It is native to the Himalayas of Tibet and Nepal at elevations of 3800–5000 m.
