= Berberis baluchistanica =

Scientific classification
- Kingdom: Plantae
- Clade: Embryophytes
- Clade: Tracheophytes
- Clade: Spermatophytes
- Clade: Angiosperms
- Clade: Eudicots
- Order: Ranunculales
- Family: Berberidaceae
- Genus: Berberis
- Species: B. baluchistanica

Binomial name
- Berberis baluchistanica Ahrendt

Species of flowering plant

Berberis baluchistanica is a species of flowering plant in the family Berberidaceae, native to western Pakistan. It produces a unique flavone, berberisinol.
