= Berberis beauverdiana =

Conservation status
- Near Threatened (IUCN 3.1)

Scientific classification
- Kingdom: Plantae
- Clade: Tracheophytes
- Clade: Angiosperms
- Clade: Eudicots
- Order: Ranunculales
- Family: Berberidaceae
- Genus: Berberis
- Species: B. beauverdiana

Binomial name
- Berberis beauverdiana C.Schneider

Species of plant

Berberis beauverdiana is a species of plant in the family Berberidaceae. It is endemic to Peru.
