= Berberis ehrenbergii =

Scientific classification
- Kingdom: Plantae
- Clade: Tracheophytes
- Clade: Angiosperms
- Clade: Eudicots
- Order: Ranunculales
- Family: Berberidaceae
- Genus: Berberis
- Species: B. ehrenbergii

Binomial name
- Berberis ehrenbergii Kunze (1847)

Synonyms
- Mahonia ehrenbergii (Kunze) Bosse (1860); Odostemon ehrenbergii (Kunze) Standl. (1922)

Species of shrub

Berberis ehrenbergii is a shrub in the Berberidaceae described as a species in 1847. It is native to the States of Chiapas, Tamaulipas, and Veracruz in southern Mexico.

== Taxonomy ==
Berberis ehrenbergii was scientifically described and named by Gustav Kunze. As part of the long continued debate over if certain species should be classified in genus Mahonia or in Berberis it was renamed Mahonia ehrenbergii by Julius Friedrich Wilhelm Bosse in 1860. Unaware that it already had been so described Friedrich Karl Georg Fedde published it under the same name in 1901. A third reclassification was published in 1922 by Paul Carpenter Standley as Odostemon ehrenbergii. A paper published by Joseph Edward Laferrière in 1997 summarized the arguments for Mahonia being more properly classified as a synonym of Berberis. As of 2023 this is the most common classification by botanists.
