= Berberis wilcoxii =

Conservation status
- Apparently Secure (NatureServe)

Scientific classification
- Kingdom: Plantae
- Clade: Tracheophytes
- Clade: Angiosperms
- Clade: Eudicots
- Order: Ranunculales
- Family: Berberidaceae
- Genus: Berberis
- Species: B. wilcoxii

Binomial name
- Berberis wilcoxii Kearney

Synonyms
- Odostemon wilcoxii (Kearney) A. Heller

Species of shrub

Berberis wilcoxii is a shrub native to Arizona, New Mexico and Sonora. It is up to 2 m tall, with pinnately compound leaves of 5-7 leaflets, densely clustered racemes and ovoid berries up to 10 mm long. It is generally found in rocky canyons in mountainous areas at an elevation of 1700–2500 m.

The compound leaves place this species in the group sometimes segregated as the genus Mahonia.
