= Berberis reticulinervis =

Scientific classification
- Kingdom: Plantae
- Clade: Tracheophytes
- Clade: Angiosperms
- Clade: Eudicots
- Order: Ranunculales
- Family: Berberidaceae
- Genus: Berberis
- Species: B. reticulinervis

Binomial name
- Berberis reticulinervis T.S.Ying

Species of shrub

Berberis reticulinervis is a shrub in the family Berberidaceae described as a species in 1999. It is endemic to China, known from the Provinces or Gansu, Sichuan, and Xizang (Tibet).
