= Berberis decipiens =

Conservation status
- Vulnerable (IUCN 3.1)

Scientific classification
- Kingdom: Plantae
- Clade: Tracheophytes
- Clade: Angiosperms
- Clade: Eudicots
- Order: Ranunculales
- Family: Berberidaceae
- Genus: Berberis
- Species: B. decipiens

Binomial name
- Berberis decipiens (C.K.Schneid.) Laferr.

Synonyms
- Mahonia decipiens C.K.Schneid.

Species of shrub

Berberis decipiens is a species of shrub in the Berberidaceae described as a species in 1913. It is endemic to Hubei Province in China. The species is listed as vulnerable by the IUCN.

== Taxonomy ==
Berberis decipiens was initially scientifically described and named Mahonia decipiens by Camillo Karl Schneider. A paper was published by Joseph Edward Laferrière in 1997 summarized the arguments for reclassifying moving it and other species of genus Mahonia as part of genus Berberis. As of 2023 this is the most commonly accepted classification.
