= Berberis rawatii =

Scientific classification
- Kingdom: Plantae
- Clade: Tracheophytes
- Clade: Angiosperms
- Clade: Eudicots
- Order: Ranunculales
- Family: Berberidaceae
- Genus: Berberis
- Species: B. rawatii

Binomial name
- Berberis rawatii Tiwari & Adhikari

Species of shrub

Berberis rawatii is a shrub in the family Berberidaceae. It is known only from the Chamoli and Pithoragarh districts of Uttarakhand in northern India.
