= Berberis ahrendtii =

Scientific classification
- Kingdom: Plantae
- Clade: Tracheophytes
- Clade: Angiosperms
- Clade: Eudicots
- Order: Ranunculales
- Family: Berberidaceae
- Genus: Berberis
- Species: B. ahrendtii

Binomial name
- Berberis ahrendtii R.R.Rao & Uniyal 1986

Synonyms
- Berberis lycioides Stapf 1926 not Linden & Planch. 1863

Species of shrub

Berberis ahrendtii is an Indian shrub in the barberry family first described as a species in 1926. The name given to it at that time had to be changed later because it was discovered that the 1926 name was a homonym of a name applied to a Venezuelan plant in 1863.

Berberis ahrendtii is known only from the Chamoli and Pithoragarh districts of Uttarakhand in northern India. The species was long thought to be extinct because it had not been collected in nearly 100 years until living populations were discovered recently.
