= Berberis lambertii =

Scientific classification
- Kingdom: Plantae
- Clade: Tracheophytes
- Clade: Angiosperms
- Clade: Eudicots
- Order: Ranunculales
- Family: Berberidaceae
- Genus: Berberis
- Species: B. lambertii

Binomial name
- Berberis lambertii R.Parker

Species of shrub

Berberis lambertii is a shrub in the family Berberidaceae described as a species in 1921. It is known only from the Chamoli and Pithoragarh districts of Uttarakhand in northern India. The species was long thought to be extinct because it had not been collected in nearly 100 years until living populations were discovered recently.
