= Berberis trifolia =

Scientific classification
- Kingdom: Plantae
- Clade: Tracheophytes
- Clade: Angiosperms
- Clade: Eudicots
- Order: Ranunculales
- Family: Berberidaceae
- Genus: Berberis
- Species: B. trifolia

Binomial name
- Berberis trifolia Schult. & Schult. f.

Synonyms
- Odostemon trifolius (Schult. & Schult. f.) Standl.; Mahonia trifolia Roem. & Schult.

Species of shrub

Berberis trifolia is a shrub in the Berberidaceae described as a species in 1830. It is endemic to Mexico, known from the states of Hidalgo, Mexico, and Veracruz.
