= Berberis reticulinervia =

Scientific classification
- Kingdom: Plantae
- Clade: Tracheophytes
- Clade: Angiosperms
- Clade: Eudicots
- Order: Ranunculales
- Family: Berberidaceae
- Genus: Berberis
- Species: B. reticulinervia

Binomial name
- Berberis reticulinervia (C.Y.Wu ex S.Y.Bao) Laferr. (1985)

Synonyms
- Mahonia reticulinervia C.Y.Wu ex S.Y.Bao (1987); Mahonia retinervis P.K.Hsiao & Y.S.Wang (1985)

Species of shrub

Berberis reticulinervia is a shrub in the family Berberidaceae described as a species in 1987. It is endemic to China in the Guangxi, Gansu, Sichuan, Tibet, and Yunnan Provinces.

== Taxonomy ==
Berberis reticulinervia was initially scientifically described and named Mahonia reticulinervia by Cheng Yih Wu and Shi Ying Bao. Slightly before this in 1985 Pei Ken Hsiao and Yu Sheng Wang had described and named Mahonia retinervis, however this is now generally described as a heterotypic synonym, one with a different type specimen from the one that now describes the species. A paper published by Joseph Edward Laferrière in 1997 summarized the arguments for Mahonia being more properly classified as a synonym of Berberis renaming it Berberis reticulinervia. As of 2023 this is the most common classification by botanists.
