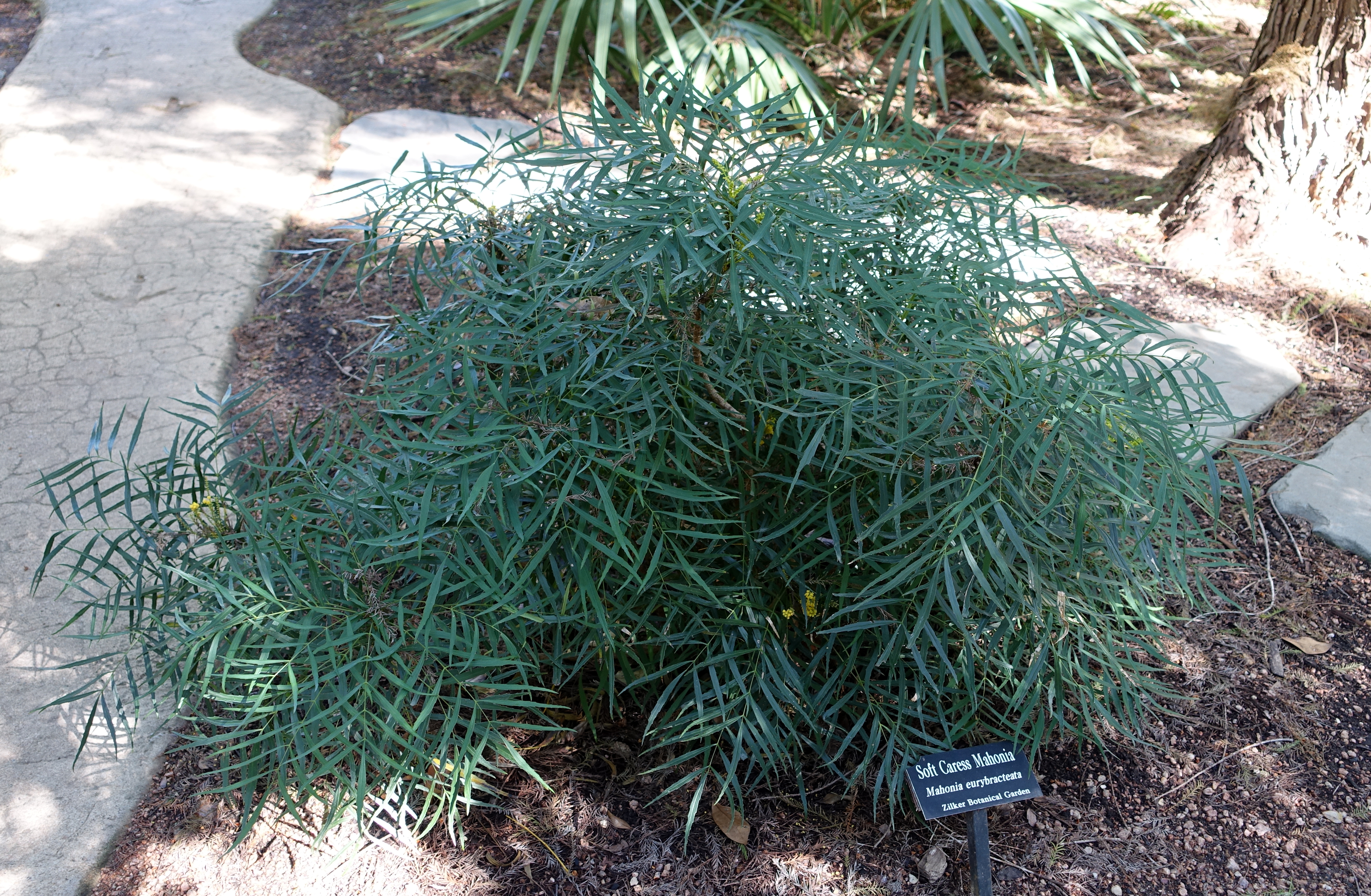

Scientific classification
- Kingdom: Plantae
- Clade: Tracheophytes
- Clade: Angiosperms
- Clade: Eudicots
- Order: Ranunculales
- Family: Berberidaceae
- Genus: Berberis
- Species: B. eurybracteata

Binomial name
- Berberis eurybracteata (Fedde) Laferr.

Synonyms
- Berberis berberidifolia (P.K.Hsiao & Y.S.Wang) Laferr.; Berberis confusa (Sprague) Laferr.; Mahonia berberidifolia P.K.Hsiao & Y.S.Wang; Mahonia confusa Sprague; Mahonia eurybracteata Fedde; Mahonia ganpinensis var. confusa (Sprague) C.K.Schneid. ex H.H.Chung; Mahonia zemanii C.K.Schneid.

= Berberis eurybracteata =

Species of shrub

Berberis eurybracteata is a species of shrub in the Berberidaceae described as a species in 1901. It is endemic to China. It was previously named Mahonia eurybracteata, and is still often referred to by its former scientific name, especially in horticulture.

== Taxonomy ==
Berberis eurybracteata was initially scientifically described and named Mahonia eurybracteata by Friedrich Karl Georg Fedde. A paper was published by Joseph Edward Laferrière in 1997 summarized the arguments for reclassifying moving it and other species of genus Mahonia to be part of genus Berberis. As of 2023 this is the most commonly accepted classification.
