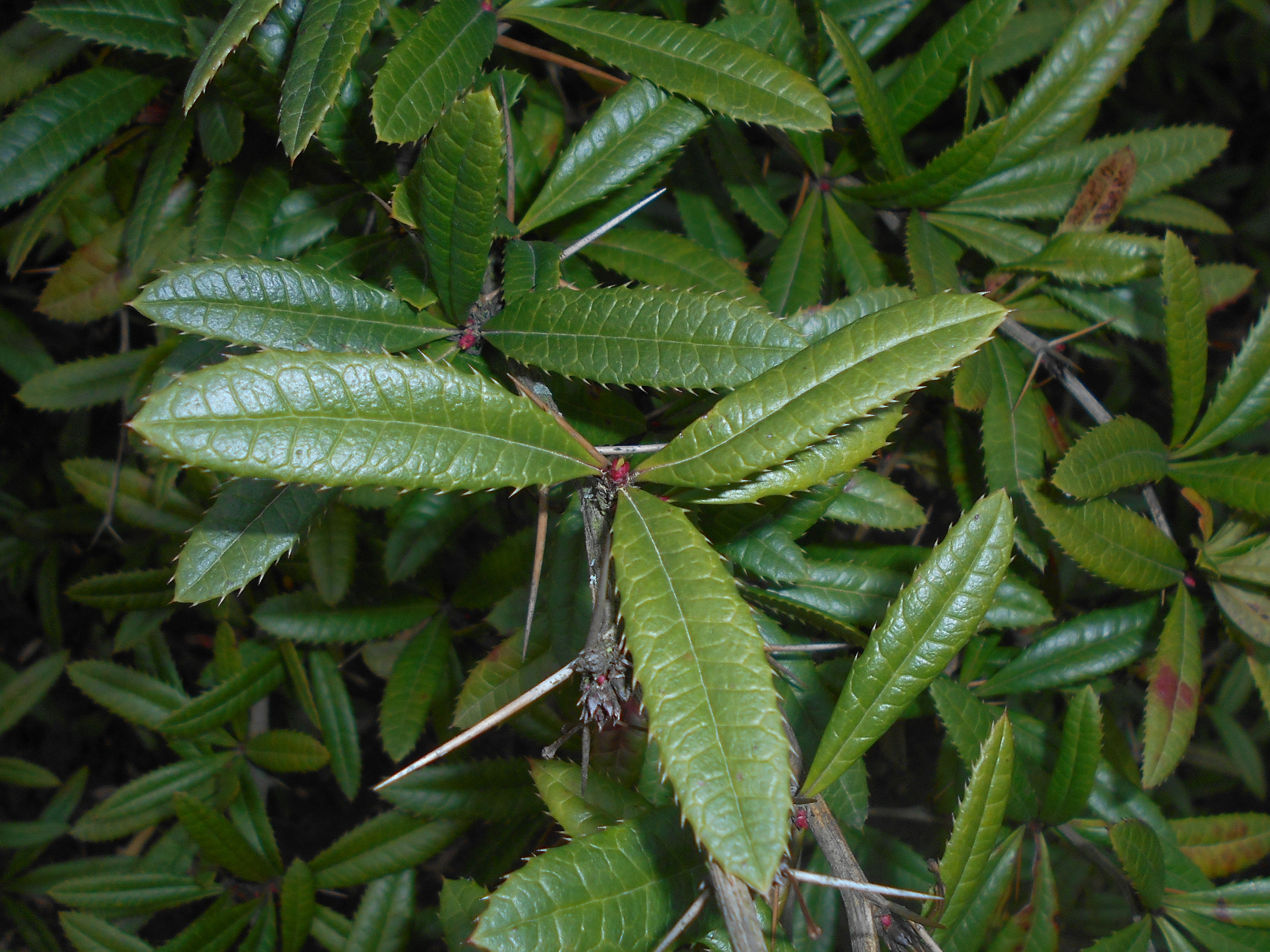

Scientific classification
- Kingdom: Plantae
- Clade: Tracheophytes
- Clade: Angiosperms
- Clade: Eudicots
- Order: Ranunculales
- Family: Berberidaceae
- Genus: Berberis
- Species: B. veitchii

Binomial name
- Berberis veitchii Schneid. in Sargent

Synonyms
- Berberis acuminata H.J.Veitch

= Berberis veitchii =

Species of shrub

Berberis veitchii is a shrub native to western Hubei, China. It was once cultivated as an ornamental in other countries, the source almost certainly being seed collected by Wilson.

Berberis veitchii is an evergreen shrub up to 150 cm tall, with yellow spines along the younger branches. Leaves are simple, lanceolate, leathery, up to 11 cm long. Flowers are yellow, born in groups of up to 10. Berries are egg-shaped, blue with a white waxy bloom, up to 10 mm long.
