= Berberis elegans =

Scientific classification
- Kingdom: Plantae
- Clade: Tracheophytes
- Clade: Angiosperms
- Clade: Eudicots
- Order: Ranunculales
- Family: Berberidaceae
- Genus: Berberis
- Species: B. elegans

Binomial name
- Berberis elegans H.Lév.

Synonyms
- Berberis bodinieri (Gagnep.) Laferr.; Berberis japonica var. trifurca (Loudon) Laferr.; Berberis leveilleana (C.K.Schneid.) Laferr.; Berberis qianensis X.H.Li; Berberis trifurca Loudon; Mahonia bodinieri Gagnep.; Mahonia elegans (H.Lév.) Rehder; Mahonia japonica var. trifurca (Loudon) Ahrendt; Mahonia leveilleana C.K.Schneid.; Mahonia trifurca (Loudon) Loudon; Mahonia trifurcata Dippel

Species of shrub

Berberis elegans is a shrub in the Berberidaceae described as a species in 1908. It is endemic to China, found in the provinces of Guangdong, Guangxi, Guizhou, Hunan, Jiangxi, Sichuan, and Zhejiang.

== Taxonomy ==
As of 2023 it is usually classified as Berberis elegans, but in some sources it is still named as Mahonia bodinieri.
