= Berberis paxii =

Scientific classification
- Kingdom: Plantae
- Clade: Tracheophytes
- Clade: Angiosperms
- Clade: Eudicots
- Order: Ranunculales
- Family: Berberidaceae
- Genus: Berberis
- Species: B. paxii

Binomial name
- Berberis paxii (Fedde) Marroq. & Laferr.

Synonyms
- Mahonia paxii Fedde; Odostemon paxii (Fedde) Standl.

Species of shrub

Berberis paxii is a shrub in the Berberidaceae described as a species in 1901. It is endemic to the State of Hidalgo in eastern Mexico.
