= Berberis haoi =

Scientific classification
- Kingdom: Plantae
- Clade: Tracheophytes
- Clade: Angiosperms
- Clade: Eudicots
- Order: Ranunculales
- Family: Berberidaceae
- Genus: Berberis
- Species: B. haoi

Binomial name
- Berberis haoi T.S.Ying

Species of shrub

Berberis haoi is a species of flowering plant in the family Berberidaceae, first described in 1999. It is endemic to Gansu Province in northwestern China.

Berberis haoi is a shrub up to 1 m tall. Leaves are deciduous, simple, narrowly oblanceolate to elliptical. Inflorescence is a raceme of 6-10 flowers. Berries are ellipsoid, each with 2 seeds.
