= Berberis polyodonta =

Scientific classification
- Kingdom: Plantae
- Clade: Tracheophytes
- Clade: Angiosperms
- Clade: Eudicots
- Order: Ranunculales
- Family: Berberidaceae
- Genus: Berberis
- Species: B. polyodonta

Binomial name
- Berberis polyodonta (Fedde) Laferr. (1997)

Synonyms
- Berberis pachakshirensis (Ahrendt) Laferr. (1997); Berberis veitchiorum Hemsl. & E.H.Wilson (1906); Mahonia pachakshirensis Ahrendt (1961); Mahonia polyodonta Fedde (1900); Mahonia veitchiorum (Hemsl. & E.H.Wilson) C.K.Schneid. (1913)

Species of shrub

Berberis polyodonta is a shrub in the Berberidaceae described as a species in 1901. It is native to Assam, Myanmar, and southwestern China (Guizhou, Hubei, Sichuan, Tibet, Yunnan).

== Taxonomy ==
Berberis polyodonta was initially scientifically described and named Mahonia polyodonta by Friedrich Karl Georg Fedde. A paper published by Joseph Edward Laferrière in 1997 summarized the arguments for Mahonia being more properly classified as a synonym of Berberis renaming it Berberis polyodonta. As of 2023 this is the most common classification by botanists.
