= Berberis dryandriphylla =

Conservation status
- Endangered (IUCN 3.1)

Scientific classification
- Kingdom: Plantae
- Clade: Tracheophytes
- Clade: Angiosperms
- Clade: Eudicots
- Order: Ranunculales
- Family: Berberidaceae
- Genus: Berberis
- Species: B. dryandriphylla

Binomial name
- Berberis dryandriphylla Diels

Species of plant

Berberis dryandriphylla is a species of plant in the family Berberidaceae. It is endemic to Peru.
