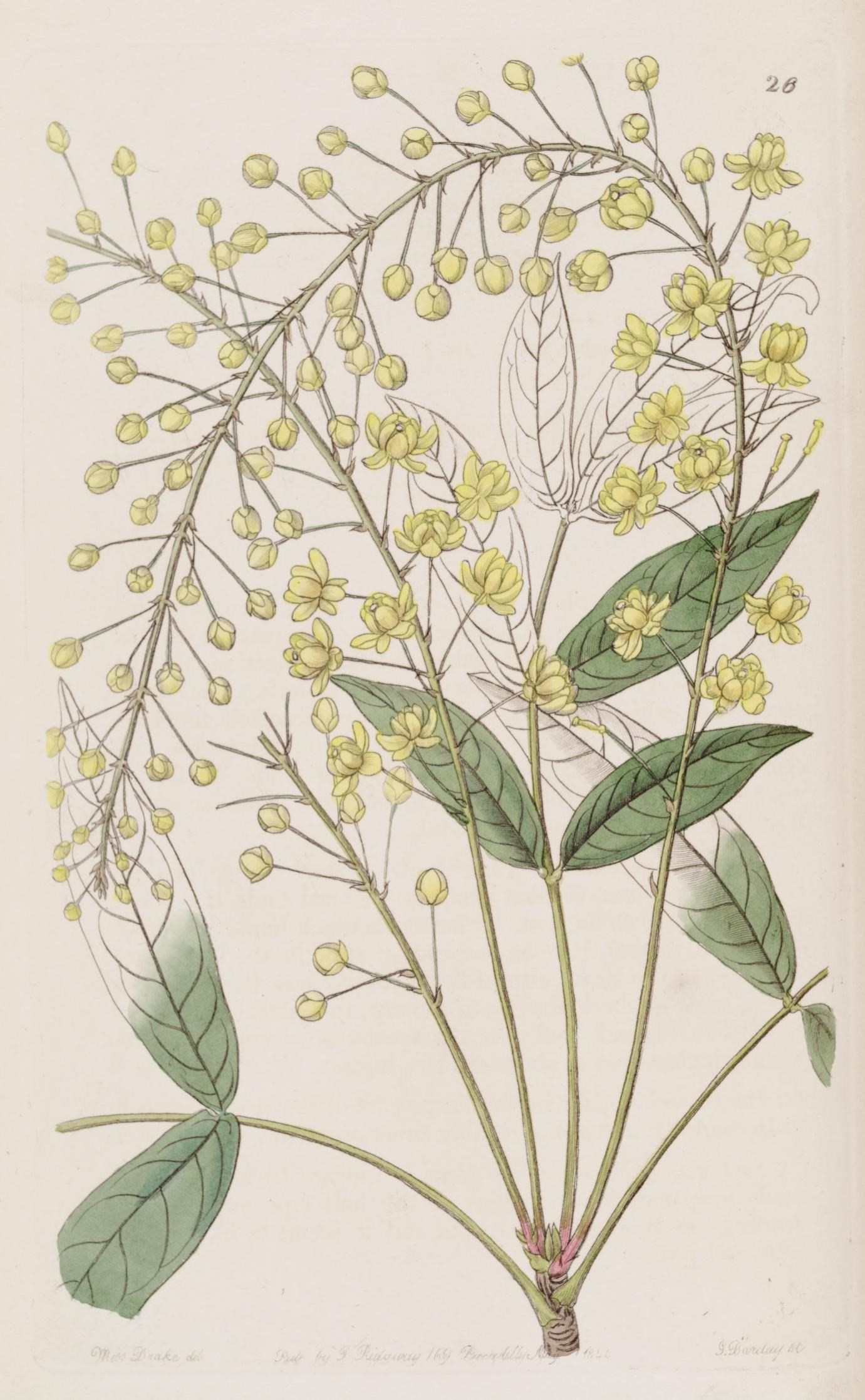
- Illustration by Sarah Drake

Scientific classification
- Kingdom: Plantae
- Clade: Tracheophytes
- Clade: Angiosperms
- Clade: Eudicots
- Order: Ranunculales
- Family: Berberidaceae
- Genus: Berberis
- Species: B. tenuifolia

Binomial name
- Berberis tenuifolia Lindl.

Synonyms
- Mahonia tenuifolia (Lindl.) Loudon ex Fedde; Odostemon tenuifolius (Lindl.) Standl

= Berberis tenuifolia =

Species of shrub

Berberis tenuifolia is a shrub in the family Berberidaceae described as a species in 1838. It is native to Cuba and Mexico (States of Veracruz, Chiapas, and Oaxaca).
