= Berberis ilicina =

Scientific classification
- Kingdom: Plantae
- Clade: Tracheophytes
- Clade: Angiosperms
- Clade: Eudicots
- Order: Ranunculales
- Family: Berberidaceae
- Genus: Berberis
- Species: B. ilicina

Binomial name
- Berberis ilicina (Schltdl.) Hemsl.

Synonyms
- Mahonia ilicina Schltdl.; Odostemon ilicinus (Schltdl.) Standl.

Species of shrub

Berberis ilicina is a shrub in the Berberidaceae described as a species in 1836. It is endemic to northeastern Mexico, found in the States of Hidalgo and Tamaulipas.
