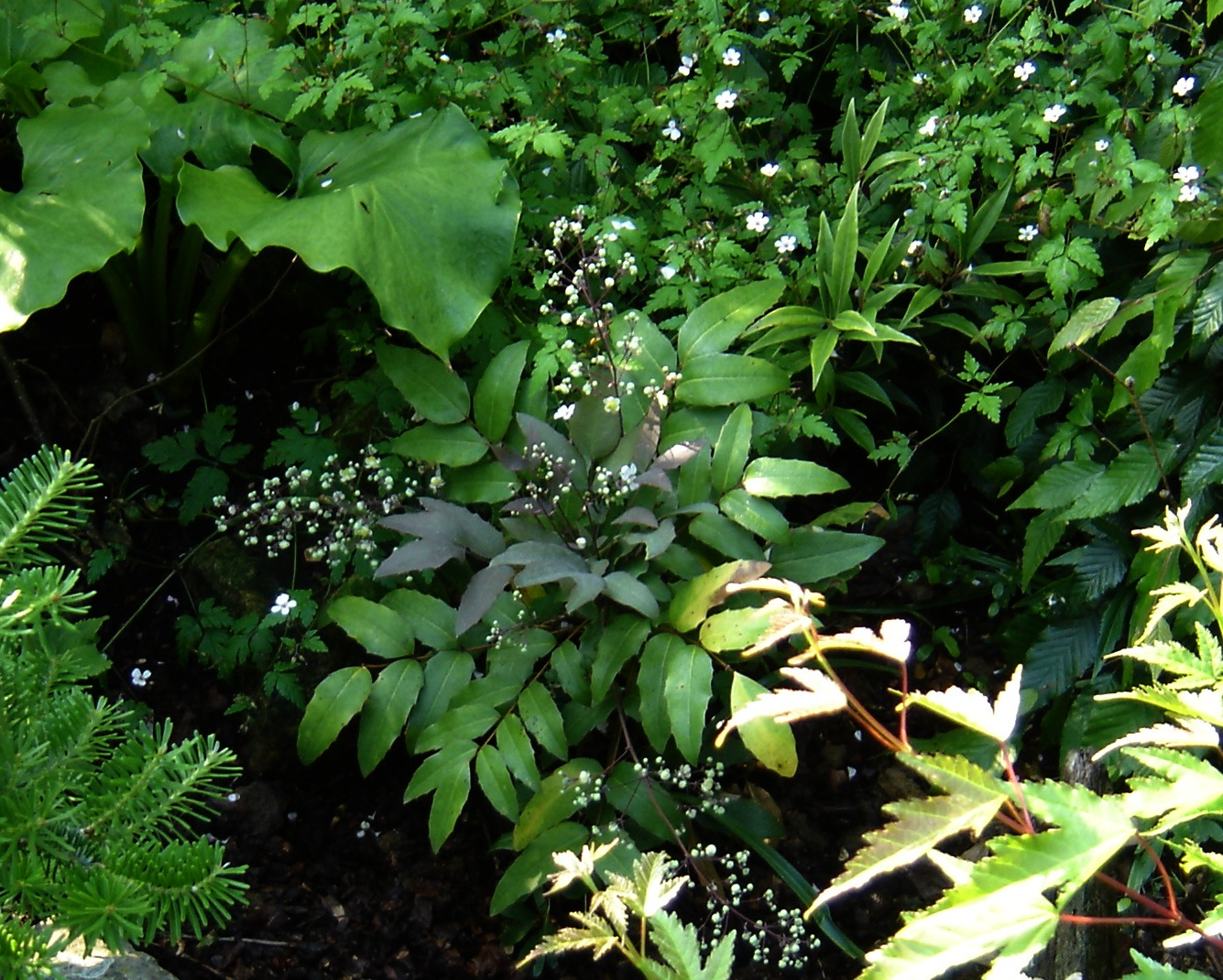

Scientific classification
- Kingdom: Plantae
- Clade: Tracheophytes
- Clade: Angiosperms
- Clade: Eudicots
- Order: Ranunculales
- Family: Berberidaceae
- Genus: Berberis
- Species: B. pallida

Binomial name
- Berberis pallida Benth.

Synonyms
- Mahonia pallida (Benth.) Fedde; Odostemon pallidus (Benth.) Standl.

= Berberis pallida =

Species of shrub

Berberis pallida is a shrub in the Berberidaceae described as a species in 1840. It is endemic to Mexico, known from the States of Guanajuato, Hidalgo, Oaxaca, Veracruz, Puebla, Querétaro, and Tamaulipas.
