= Berberis hayatana =

Scientific classification
- Kingdom: Plantae
- Clade: Tracheophytes
- Clade: Angiosperms
- Clade: Eudicots
- Order: Ranunculales
- Family: Berberidaceae
- Genus: Berberis
- Species: B. hayatana

Binomial name
- Berberis hayatana Mizushima

Synonyms
- Berberis formosana H.L. Li 1952, illegitimate homonym, not Ahrendt 1941

Species of shrub

Berberis hayatana is a species of flowering plant in the family Berberidaceae, first described in 1952, then renamed in 1954. It is endemic to Taiwan.

Berberis hayatana is a low evergreen shrub. Leaves are leathery, simple, narrowly oblanceolate to elliptical. Inflorescence is a fascicle of 2-6 flowers. Berries are ellipsoid, black.
