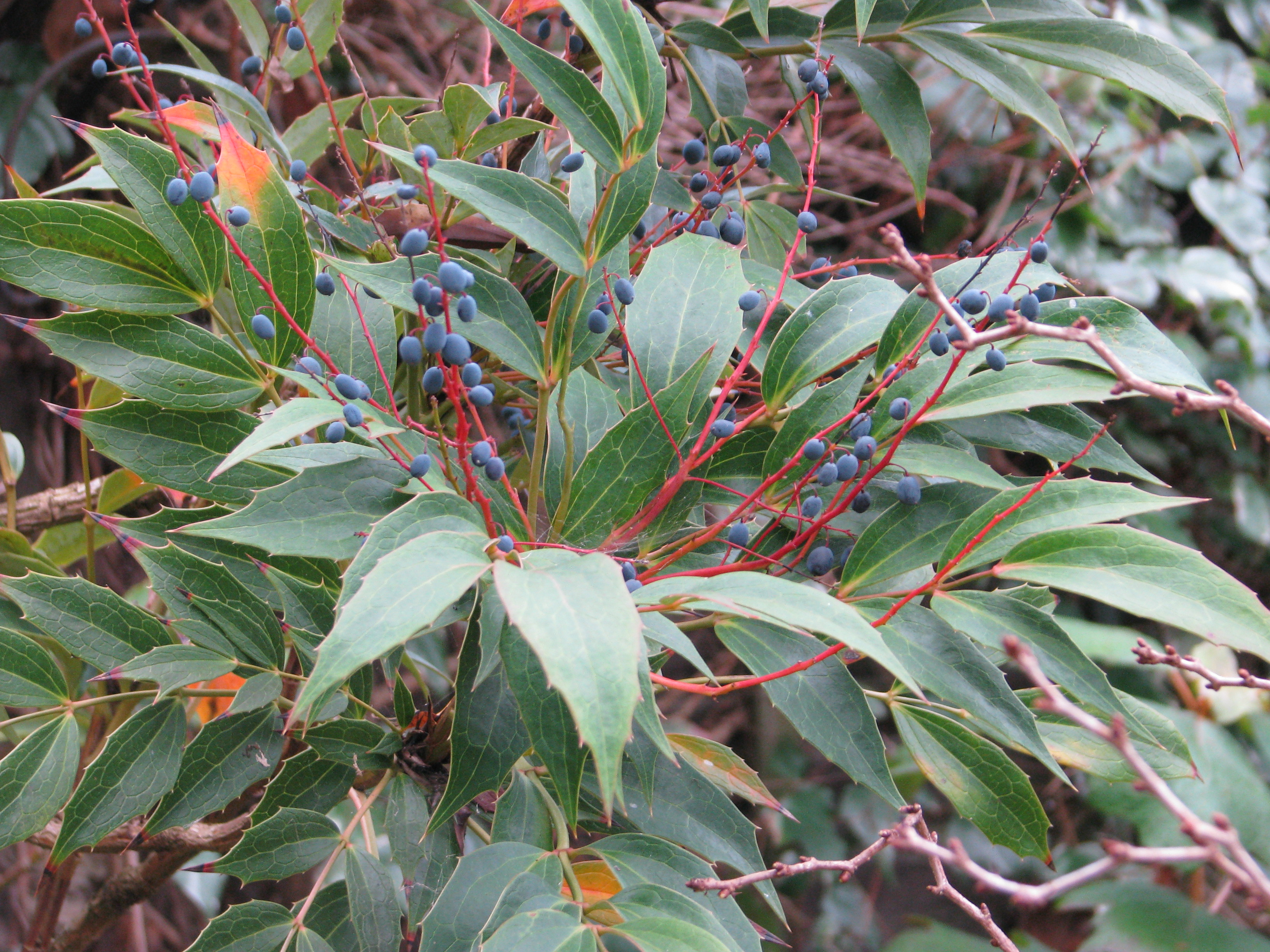

Scientific classification
- Kingdom: Plantae
- Clade: Tracheophytes
- Clade: Angiosperms
- Clade: Eudicots
- Order: Ranunculales
- Family: Berberidaceae
- Genus: Berberis
- Species: B. gracilipes

Binomial name
- Berberis gracilipes Oliv.

Synonyms
- Berberis subtriplinervis Franch. Mahonia gracilipes; (Oliv.) Fedde Mahonia gracilipes var. rhombicus; Z.F.Pan & Z.P.Song Mahonia subtriplinervis; (Franch.) Fedde

= Berberis gracilipes =

Species of shrub

Berberis gracilipes is a shrub in the family Berberidaceae, first described in 1887. It is endemic to China, native to the Sichuan and Yunnan Provinces.

== Taxonomy ==
Berberis gracilipes was initially scientifically described and named by Daniel Oliver. As a part of the classification of some of genus Berberis as part of a separate genus Mahonia Friedrich Karl Georg Fedde renamed it as Mahonia gracilipes in 1901. A paper was published by Joseph Edward Laferrière in 1997 summarized the arguments for Mahonia being more properly classified as a synonym of Berberis. As of 2023 this is the most common classification by botanists.
