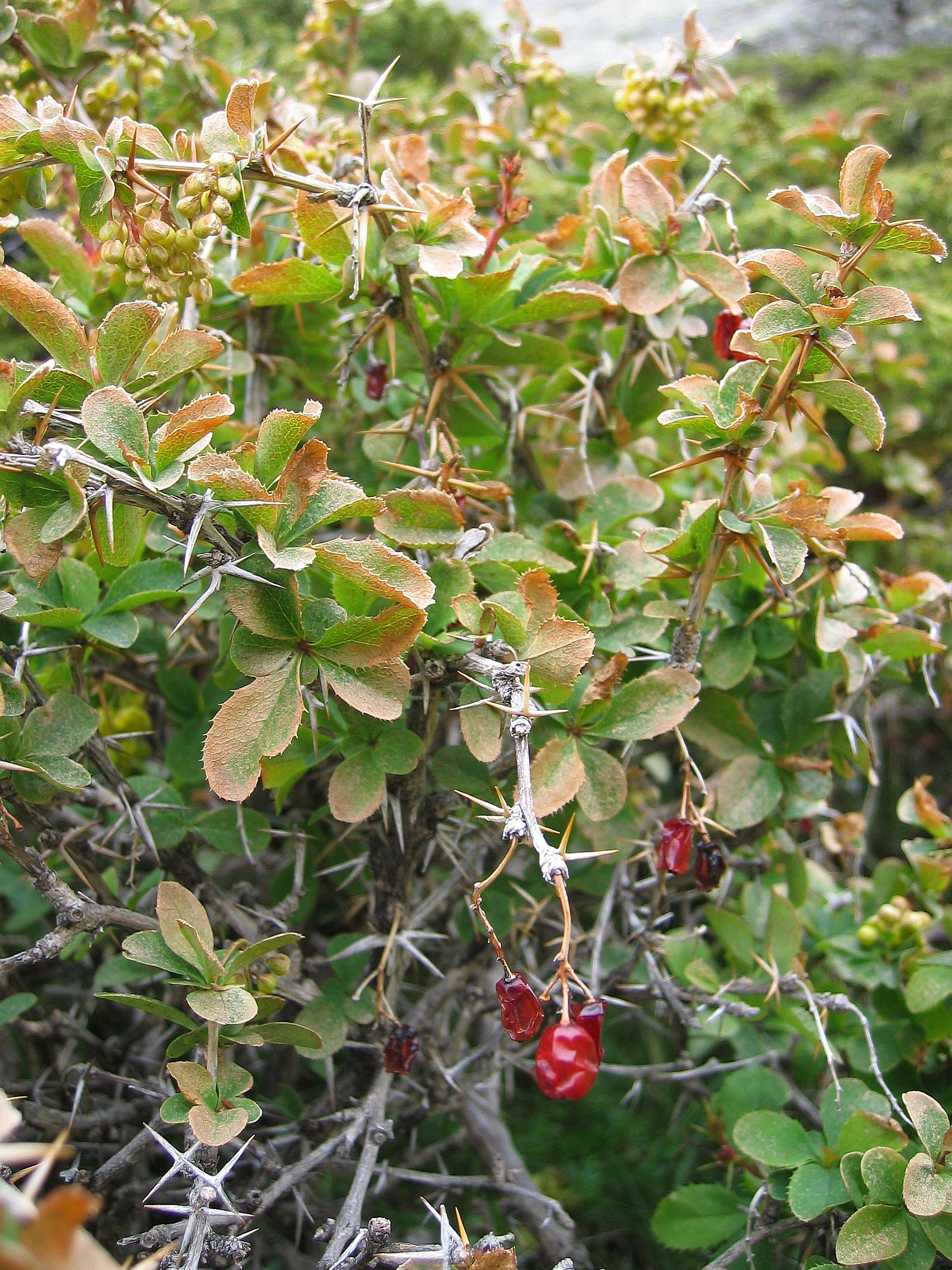

Scientific classification
- Kingdom: Plantae
- Clade: Tracheophytes
- Clade: Angiosperms
- Clade: Eudicots
- Order: Ranunculales
- Family: Berberidaceae
- Genus: Berberis
- Species: B. aetnensis

Binomial name
- Berberis aetnensis C.Presl

Synonyms
- Berberis vulgaris subsp. aetnensis (C. Presl) Rouy & Foucaud; Berberis vulgaris var. aetnensis (C. Presl) Hook. f. & Thomson

= Berberis aetnensis =

Species of shrub

Berberis aetnensis is a shrub in the family Berberidaceae described as a species in 1826. It is native to Southern Italy (Campania, Basilicata, Calabria, Sicily, Sardinia) Croatia, Bosnia and Herzegovina and Montenegro. The species is named for Mount Etna in Sicily.
