= Berberis sheridaniana =

Scientific classification
- Kingdom: Plantae
- Clade: Tracheophytes
- Clade: Angiosperms
- Clade: Eudicots
- Order: Ranunculales
- Family: Berberidaceae
- Genus: Berberis
- Species: B. sheridaniana

Binomial name
- Berberis sheridaniana (C.K.Schneid.) Laferr.

Synonyms
- Berberis fargesii (Takeda) Laferr. (1997); Berberis huiliensis (Hand.-Mazz.) Laferr. (1997); Mahonia fargesii Takeda (1917); Mahonia huiliensis Hand.-Mazz. (1931); Mahonia sheridaniana C.K.Schneid. (1913)

Species of shrub

Berberis sheridaniana is a shrub in the Berberidaceae described as a species in 1913. It is endemic to China, found in the provinces of Hubei and Sichuan.

== Taxonomy ==
Berberis sheridaniana was initially scientifically described and named Mahonia sheridaniana by Camillo Karl Schneider. He named it named in honor of "Dr. W.R. Sheridan, formerly of the American Methodist Mission Hospital in Chengtu" (Chengdu, 成都市) This is most likely an error for Dr. W.J. Sheridan, of the Canadian Methodist Mission Hospital in Chengtu. A paper published by Joseph Edward Laferrière in 1997 summarized the arguments for Mahonia being more properly classified as a synonym of Berberis renaming it Berberis sheridaniana. As of 2023 this is the most common classification by botanists.
