= Berberis eutriphylla =

Scientific classification
- Kingdom: Plantae
- Clade: Tracheophytes
- Clade: Angiosperms
- Clade: Eudicots
- Order: Ranunculales
- Family: Berberidaceae
- Genus: Berberis
- Species: B. eutriphylla

Binomial name
- Berberis eutriphylla (Fedde) C.H.Mull. (1942)

Synonyms
- Alloberberis eutriphylla (Fedde) C.C.Yu & K.F.Chung (2017); Mahonia eutriphylla Fedde (1901); Odostemon eutriphyllus (Fedde) Standl. (1922)

Species of shrub

Berberis eutriphylla is a species of shrub in the Berberidaceae described as a species in 1901. It is endemic to northern and central Mexico, from Coahuila to Mexico State.

== Taxonomy ==
Berberis eutriphylla was initially scientifically described and named Mahonia eutriphylla by Friedrich Karl Georg Fedde. As part of the long running disagreement over the correct classification of species in Mahonia it was placed in Berberis by Cornelius Herman Muller in 1942. In 1997 Joseph Edward Laferrière published a paper summarizing the arguments and listing the species he thought were better classified as Berberis. As of 2023 Berberis eutriphylla is the most widely used name for this species, though debate continues.
