= Berberis weberbaueri =

Scientific classification
- Kingdom: Plantae
- Clade: Tracheophytes
- Clade: Angiosperms
- Clade: Eudicots
- Order: Ranunculales
- Family: Berberidaceae
- Genus: Berberis
- Species: B. weberbaueri

Binomial name
- Berberis weberbaueri C.K.Schneid.

Species of plant

Berberis weberbaueri is a shrub in the Berberidaceae described as a species in 1908. It is endemic to Peru, found in the regions of Ancash, Cajamarca, La Libertad, and Lambayeque.

The species is listed as endangered.
