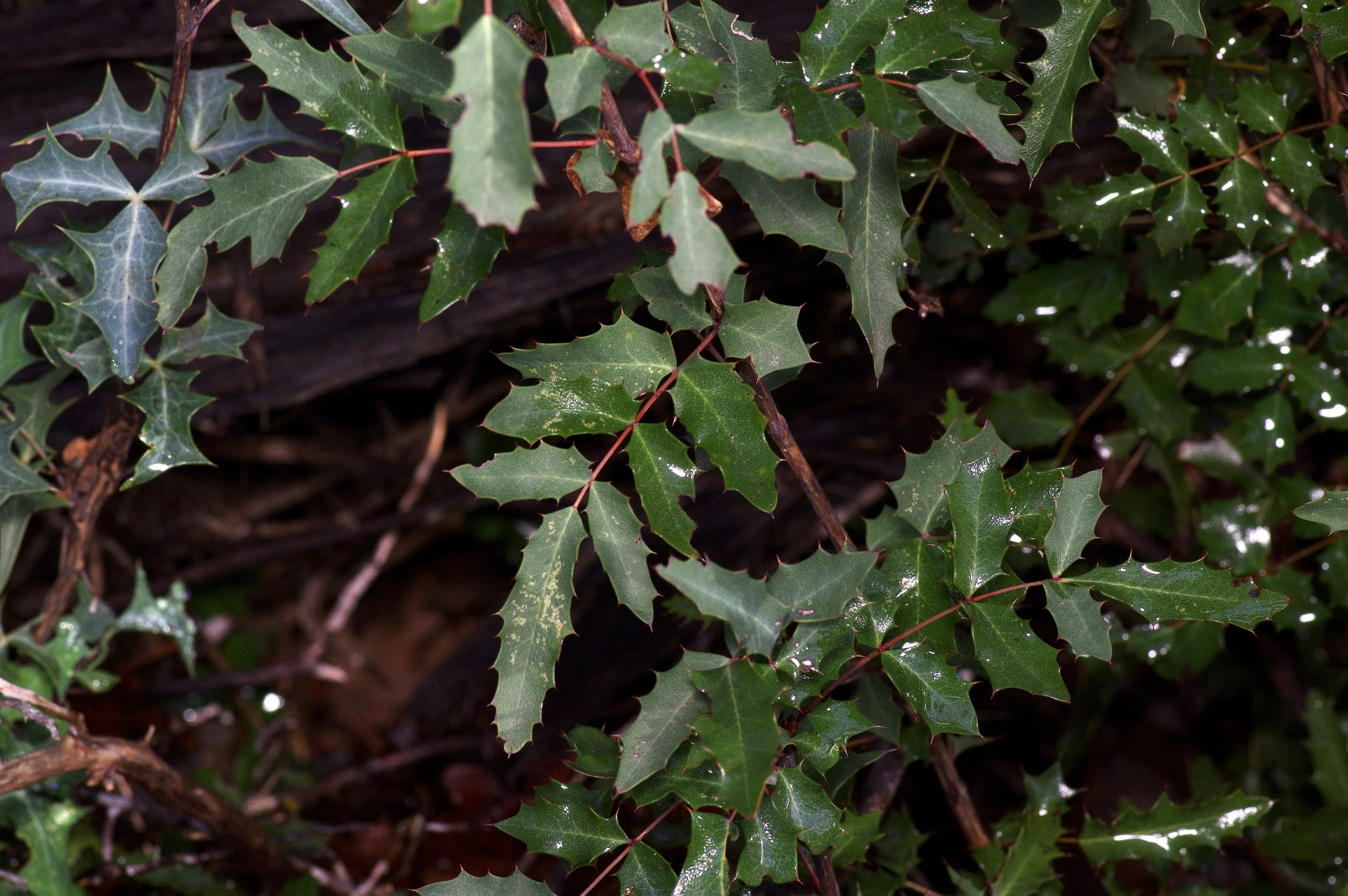
- Foliage

Conservation status
- Vulnerable (NatureServe)

Scientific classification
- Kingdom: Plantae
- Clade: Tracheophytes
- Clade: Angiosperms
- Clade: Eudicots
- Order: Ranunculales
- Family: Berberidaceae
- Genus: Berberis
- Species: B. swaseyi

Binomial name
- Berberis swaseyi Buckl. ex Young

Synonyms
- Mahonia swaseyi (Buckley ex M.J. Young) Fedde; Odostemon swaseyi (Buckley ex M.J. Young) A. Heller; Alloberbis swaseyi (Buckley) C.C. Yu & K.F. Chung

= Berberis swaseyi =

Species of shrub

Berberis swaseyi (Texas barberry) is a rare species of barberry endemic to the Edwards Plateau region of Texas. It grows in limestone ridges and canyons. The species is evergreen, with thick, rigid, five-to-nine foliolate leaves. Berries are dry or juicy, white to red, about 9–16 mm in diam.

The compound leaves place this species in the group sometimes segregated as the genus Mahonia.
