= Berberis hsuyunensis =

Scientific classification
- Kingdom: Plantae
- Clade: Tracheophytes
- Clade: Angiosperms
- Clade: Eudicots
- Order: Ranunculales
- Family: Berberidaceae
- Genus: Berberis
- Species: B. hsuyunensis

Binomial name
- Berberis hsuyunensis P.K.Hsiao & W.C.Sung

Species of shrub

Berberis hsuyunensis is a species of flowering plant in the family Berberidaceae, first described in 1974. It is endemic to Sichuan Province in China.

Berberis hsuyunensis is a shrub up to 2 m tall. Leaves are evergreen, simple, elliptical. Inflorescence is a large fascicle of 30-50 flowers. Berries are spherical, black.
