= Berberis quindiuensis =

Scientific classification
- Kingdom: Plantae
- Clade: Tracheophytes
- Clade: Angiosperms
- Clade: Eudicots
- Order: Ranunculales
- Family: Berberidaceae
- Genus: Berberis
- Species: B. quindiuensis

Binomial name
- Berberis quindiuensis Kunth ex DC. 1821

Synonyms
- B. chocontana B. nitida B. muiscarum

Species of shrub

Berberis quindiuensis is a shrub in the family of Berberidaceae described as a species by Carl Sigismund Kunth in 1821. It is native to the Boyacá department of Colombia.

== Etymology and habitat ==
The fruit-bearing fern is named after the department Quindío where the plant has been found. Synonyms for B. quinduensis are B. chocontana, B. nitida and B. muiscarum, named after the Muisca who inhabited the highlands of Colombia (Altiplano Cundiboyacense). The fern also has been discovered in Tolima.
