= Berberis incerta =

Scientific classification
- Kingdom: Plantae
- Clade: Tracheophytes
- Clade: Angiosperms
- Clade: Eudicots
- Order: Ranunculales
- Family: Berberidaceae
- Genus: Berberis
- Species: B. incerta

Binomial name
- Berberis incerta (Fedde) Marroq.

Synonyms
- Mahonia incerta Fedde (1901); Odostemon incertus (Fedde) Standl.

Species of shrub

Berberis incerta is a shrub described as a species in 1901. It is endemic to eastern Mexico, known from the States of Hidalgo and Veracruz.

== Taxonomy ==
Berberis incerta was initially scientifically described and named Mahonia incerta by Friedrich Karl Georg Fedde. As part of the long running disagreement over the correct classification of species in Mahonia it was placed in Berberis by Jorge S. Marroquín in 1993. In 1997 Joseph Edward Laferrière published a paper summarizing the arguments and listing the species he thought were better classified as Berberis. As of 2023 Berberis eutriphylla is the most widely used name for this species, though debate continues.
