= Berberis bicolor =

Conservation status
- Endangered (IUCN 3.1)

Scientific classification
- Kingdom: Plantae
- Clade: Tracheophytes
- Clade: Angiosperms
- Clade: Eudicots
- Order: Ranunculales
- Family: Berberidaceae
- Genus: Berberis
- Species: B. bicolor

Binomial name
- Berberis bicolor H.Lév.

Species of shrub

Berberis bicolor is a shrub in the Berberidaceae described as a species in 1911. It is endemic to Guizhou Province in China. Its local common name is 二色小檗 (er se xiao bo).

The species is rare and listed as endangered.
