= Berberis valenzuelae =

Scientific classification
- Kingdom: Plantae
- Clade: Tracheophytes
- Clade: Angiosperms
- Clade: Eudicots
- Order: Ranunculales
- Family: Berberidaceae
- Genus: Berberis
- Species: B. valenzuelae

Binomial name
- Berberis valenzuelae L.A. Camargo

Species of shrub

Berberis valenzuelae is a shrub in the Berberidaceae described as a species in 1992. It is endemic to the páramo de Fontibon in the Norte de Santander region of Colombia.
