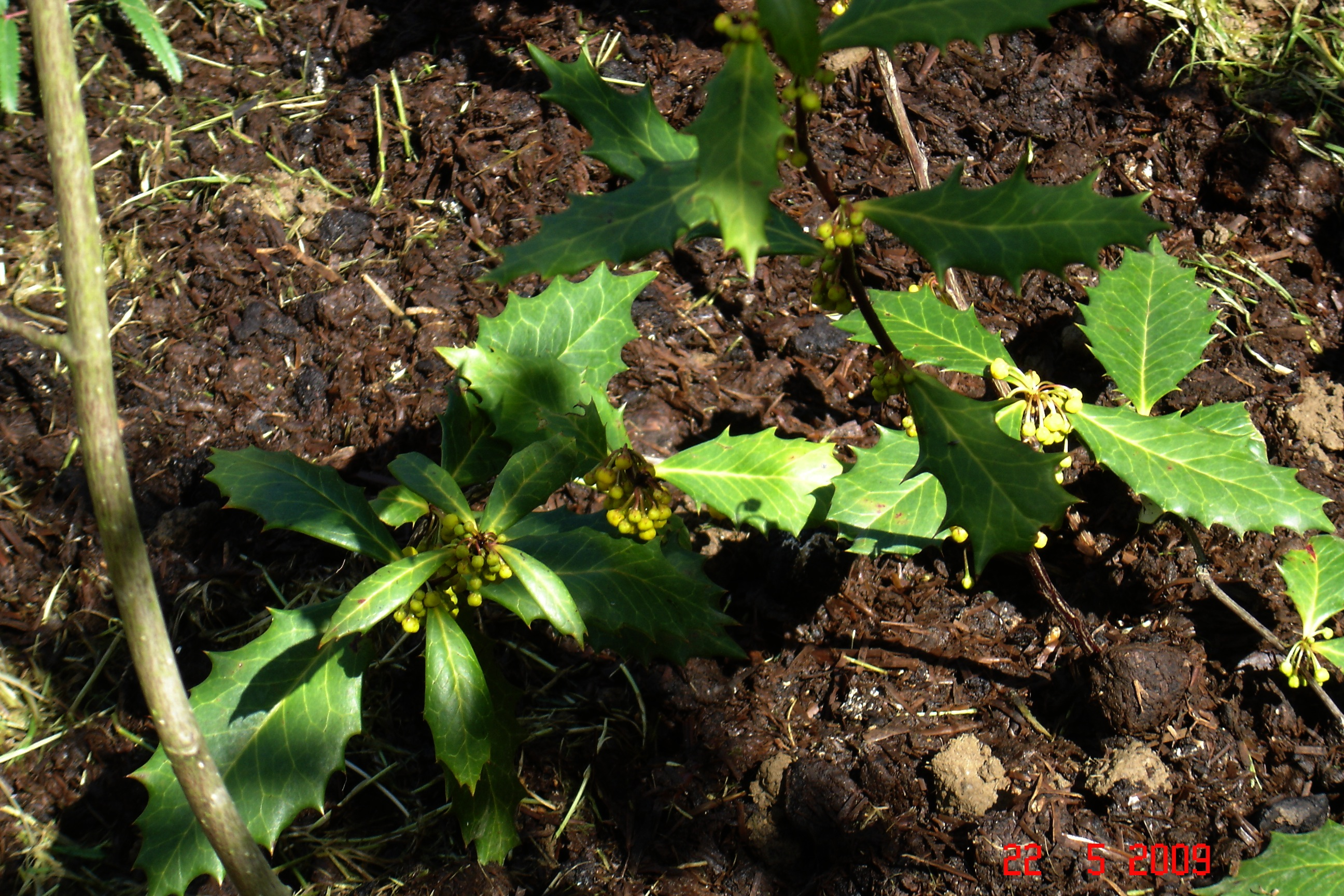

Scientific classification
- Kingdom: Plantae
- Clade: Tracheophytes
- Clade: Angiosperms
- Clade: Eudicots
- Order: Ranunculales
- Family: Berberidaceae
- Genus: Berberis
- Species: B. hypokerina

Binomial name
- Berberis hypokerina Airy Shaw

= Berberis hypokerina =

Burmese barberry

Species of shrub

Berberis hypokerina is a shrub native to northern Myanmar (Burma) and sometimes grown in other places as an ornamental. It is evergreen, reaching heights of up to 250 cm. Leaves are simple, elliptical with spiny margins. Berries are very dark purple, almost black.
