= Berberis shenii =

Scientific classification
- Kingdom: Plantae
- Clade: Tracheophytes
- Clade: Angiosperms
- Clade: Eudicots
- Order: Ranunculales
- Family: Berberidaceae
- Genus: Berberis
- Species: B. shenii

Binomial name
- Berberis shenii (Chun) Laferr.

Synonyms
- Mahonia shenii Chun (1928)

Species of shrub

Berberis shenii is a shrub in the Berberidaceae described as a species in 1928. It is endemic to China, found in the provinces of Guangdong, Guangxi, Guizhou, and Hunan.

== Taxonomy ==
Berberis shenii was initially scientifically described and named Mahonia shenii by Woon-Young Chun (Huan-Yong Chen, 陈焕镛). He named it in honor of Professor P.F. Shen of Sun Yatsen University in Canton (Guangzhou). A paper published by Joseph Edward Laferrière in 1997 summarized the arguments for Mahonia being more properly classified as a synonym of Berberis renaming it Berberis shenii. As of 2023 this is the most common classification by botanists.
