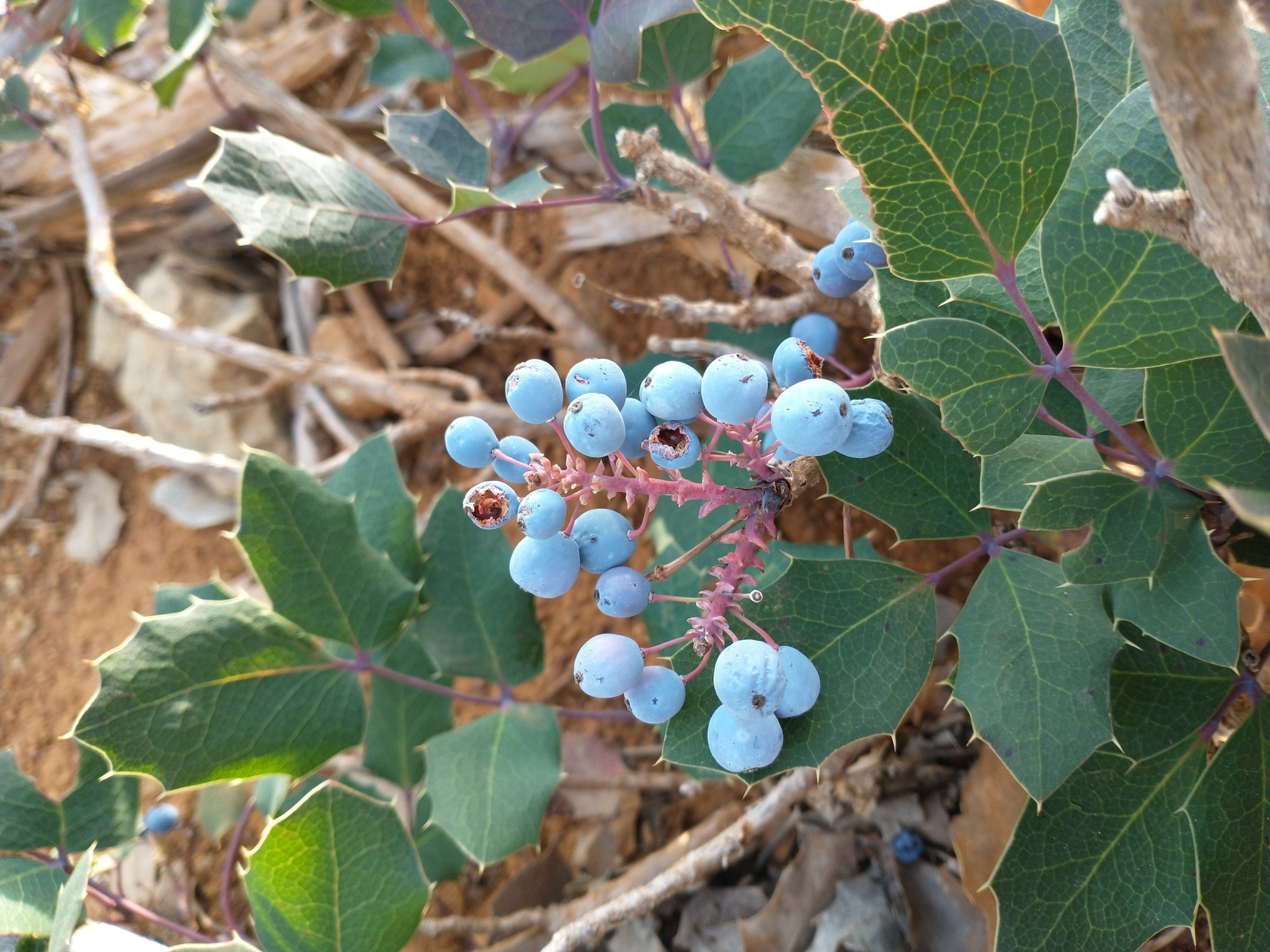

Conservation status
- Apparently Secure (NatureServe)

Scientific classification
- Kingdom: Plantae
- Clade: Tracheophytes
- Clade: Angiosperms
- Clade: Eudicots
- Order: Ranunculales
- Family: Berberidaceae
- Genus: Berberis
- Species: B. pumila

Binomial name
- Berberis pumila Greene

Synonyms
- Mahonia pumila (Greene) Fedde; Odostemon pumilus (Greene) A. Heller

= Berberis pumila =

Species of shrub

Berberis pumila is a species of shrub native to the Siskiyou Mountains of southwestern Oregon and northwestern California. It is found in open woods and rocky areas at an altitude of 300–1,200 m (980–3,940 ft), often on serpentine soils.

Berberis pumila is evergreen, rarely more than 40 cm tall. It has compound leaves and dark blue berries.

The compound leaves place this species in the group sometimes segregated as the genus Mahonia.
