= Berberis amabilis =

Scientific classification
- Kingdom: Plantae
- Clade: Tracheophytes
- Clade: Angiosperms
- Clade: Eudicots
- Order: Ranunculales
- Family: Berberidaceae
- Genus: Berberis
- Species: B. amabilis

Binomial name
- Berberis amabilis C.K. Schneid

Synonyms
- Berberis amabilis var. holophylla C.Y.Wu & S.Y.Bao

Species of shrub

Berberis amabilis is a shrub native to Yunnan and Myanmar (Burma). It grows at elevations of 1800–3300 m.

Berberis amabilis is an evergreen shrub up to 2 m tall, with spines along the younger branches. Leaves are lanceolate, up to 8 cm long. Flowers are produced in groups of as many as 25. Berries are ellipsoid, nearly black, up to 8 mm long.
