= Berberis woomungensis =

Conservation status
- Vulnerable (IUCN 3.1)

Scientific classification
- Kingdom: Plantae
- Clade: Tracheophytes
- Clade: Angiosperms
- Clade: Eudicots
- Order: Ranunculales
- Family: Berberidaceae
- Genus: Berberis
- Species: B. woomungensis

Binomial name
- Berberis woomungensis C.Y.Wu ex S.Y.Bao

Species of shrub

Berberis woomungensis is a species of plant in the family Berberidaceae. It is endemic to China.
