= Berberis alpicola =

高山小檗 gao shan xiao bo

Scientific classification
- Kingdom: Plantae
- Clade: Tracheophytes
- Clade: Angiosperms
- Clade: Eudicots
- Order: Ranunculales
- Family: Berberidaceae
- Genus: Berberis
- Species: B. alpicola

Binomial name
- Berberis alpicola C.K. Schneid

Species of shrub

Berberis alpicola is a shrub endemic to Taiwan. It grows high in the mountains at elevations of approximately 3600 m.

Berberis alpicola is an evergreen shrub up to 130 cm tall, with spines along the twigs. Leaves are elliptical, up to 25 mm long, shiny on both surfaces but a bit lighter shade of green below. Flowers are solitary. Berries are ellipsoid, nearly black, up to 10 mm long.
