= Berberis henryi =

Conservation status
- Vulnerable (IUCN 3.1)

Scientific classification
- Kingdom: Plantae
- Clade: Tracheophytes
- Clade: Angiosperms
- Clade: Eudicots
- Order: Ranunculales
- Family: Berberidaceae
- Genus: Berberis
- Species: B. henryi

Binomial name
- Berberis henryi Laferr.

Synonyms
- Mahonia conferta Takeda

Species of flowering plant

Berberis henryi is a species of plant in the family Berberidaceae. It is endemic to China.

== Taxonomy ==
Berberis henryi was initially scientifically described and named Mahonia conferta by Hisayoshi Takeda in 1917. A paper published by Joseph Edward Laferrière in 1997 summarized the arguments for Mahonia being more properly classified as a synonym of Berberis renaming it Berberis henryi. As of 2023 this is the most common classification by botanists.
