= Berberis arguta =

Scientific classification
- Kingdom: Plantae
- Clade: Tracheophytes
- Clade: Angiosperms
- Clade: Eudicots
- Order: Ranunculales
- Family: Berberidaceae
- Genus: Berberis
- Species: B. arguta

Binomial name
- Berberis arguta (Franch.) C.K.Schneid.

Synonyms
- Berberis wallichiana fo. arguta Franch.

Species of shrub

Berberis arguta is a shrub in the Berberidaceae described as a species in 1908, having been first described in 1886 at the "forma" level. It is endemic to China and is found only in the Province of Yunnan in southwestern China.
