= Berberis saxorum =

Conservation status
- Data Deficient (IUCN 3.1)

Scientific classification
- Kingdom: Plantae
- Clade: Tracheophytes
- Clade: Angiosperms
- Clade: Eudicots
- Order: Ranunculales
- Family: Berberidaceae
- Genus: Berberis
- Species: B. saxorum

Binomial name
- Berberis saxorum Ahrendt

Species of shrub

Berberis saxorum is a species of plant in the family Berberidaceae. It is endemic to Ecuador. Its natural habitat is subtropical or tropical moist montane forests.
