= Berberis nilghiriensis =

Conservation status
- Critically Endangered (IUCN 2.3)

Scientific classification
- Kingdom: Plantae
- Clade: Tracheophytes
- Clade: Angiosperms
- Clade: Eudicots
- Order: Ranunculales
- Family: Berberidaceae
- Genus: Berberis
- Species: B. nilghiriensis

Binomial name
- Berberis nilghiriensis Ahrendt

Species of shrub

Berberis nilghiriensis is a species of plant in the family Berberidaceae. It is endemic to the Nilgiris of Tamil Nadu, India.
