= Berberis hartwegii =

Scientific classification
- Kingdom: Plantae
- Clade: Tracheophytes
- Clade: Angiosperms
- Clade: Eudicots
- Order: Ranunculales
- Family: Berberidaceae
- Genus: Berberis
- Species: B. hartwegii

Binomial name
- Berberis hartwegii Benth.

Synonyms
- Mahonia hartwegii (Benth.) Fedde; Odostemon hartwegii (Benth.) Standl.

Species of shrub

Berberis hartwegii is a shrub in the Berberidaceae described as a species in 1840. It is endemic to Mexico, found in the States of Hidalgo, San Luis Potosí, and Tamaulipas.
