= Berberis flexuosa =

Scientific classification
- Kingdom: Plantae
- Clade: Tracheophytes
- Clade: Angiosperms
- Clade: Eudicots
- Order: Ranunculales
- Family: Berberidaceae
- Genus: Berberis
- Species: B. flexuosa

Binomial name
- Berberis flexuosa Ruiz & Pav.

Synonyms
- Berberis tortuosa Dombrain ex DC.

Species of plant

Berberis flexuosa is a species of shrub in the family Berberidaceae described as a species in 1802. It is endemic to Peru.
