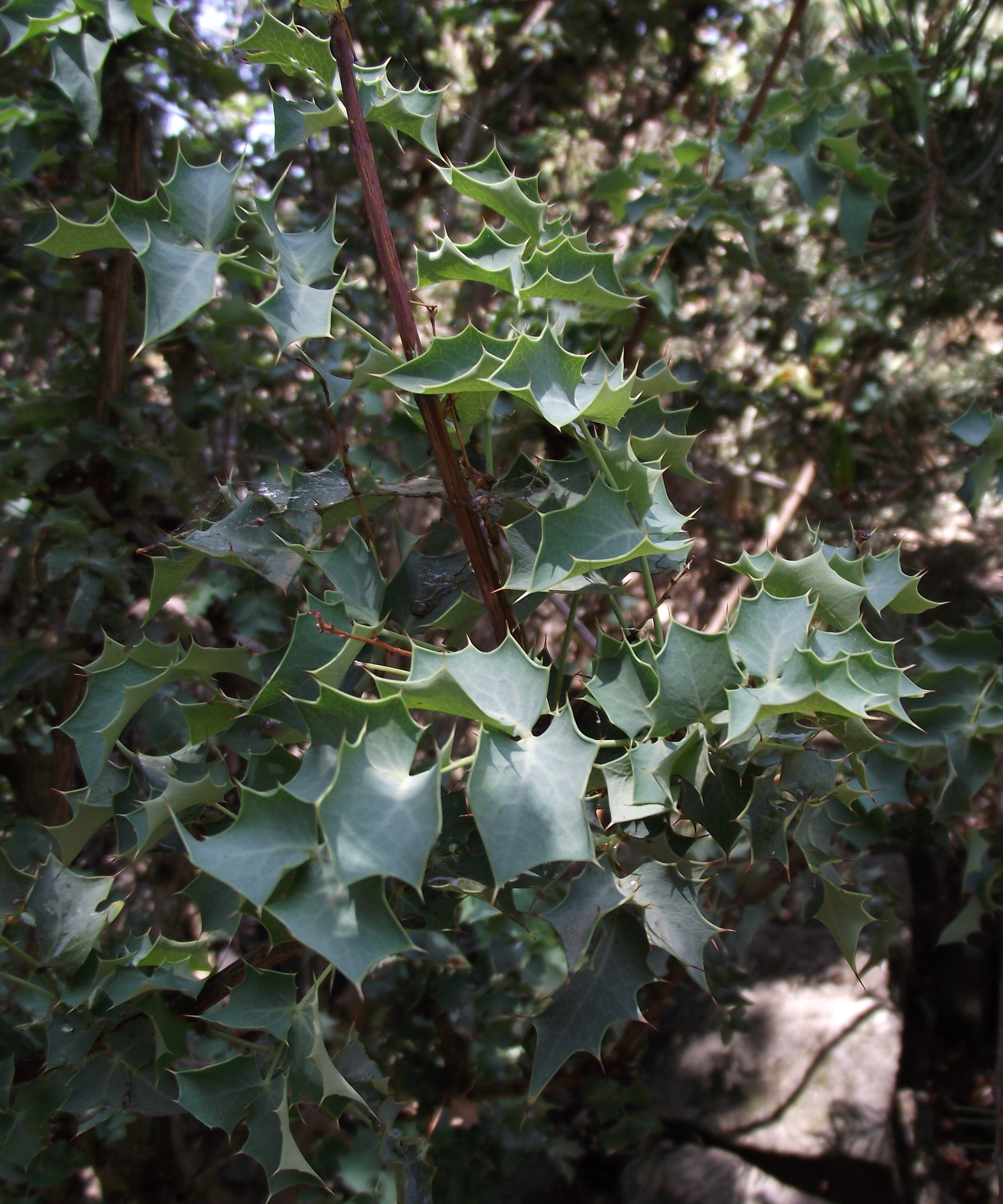

Scientific classification
- Kingdom: Plantae
- Clade: Tracheophytes
- Clade: Angiosperms
- Clade: Eudicots
- Order: Ranunculales
- Family: Berberidaceae
- Genus: Berberis
- Species: B. higginsiae

Binomial name
- Berberis higginsiae Munz

Synonyms
- Mahonia higginsiae (Munz) Ahrendt

= Berberis higginsiae =

Species of shrub

Berberis higginsiae is a shrub found only in a small region south and east of San Diego in southern California and northern Baja California. It grows in chaparral and woodland areas at elevations of 800–1,200 m (2,600–3,900 ft).

Berberis higginsiae is evergreen, with thick, stiff compound leaves. It sometimes reaches a height of up to 3 m (9.8 ft). It is similar to B. fremontii and B. haematocarpa but with narrower leaflets and yellowish-red berries.

The compound leaves place this species in the group sometimes segregated as the genus Mahonia.
