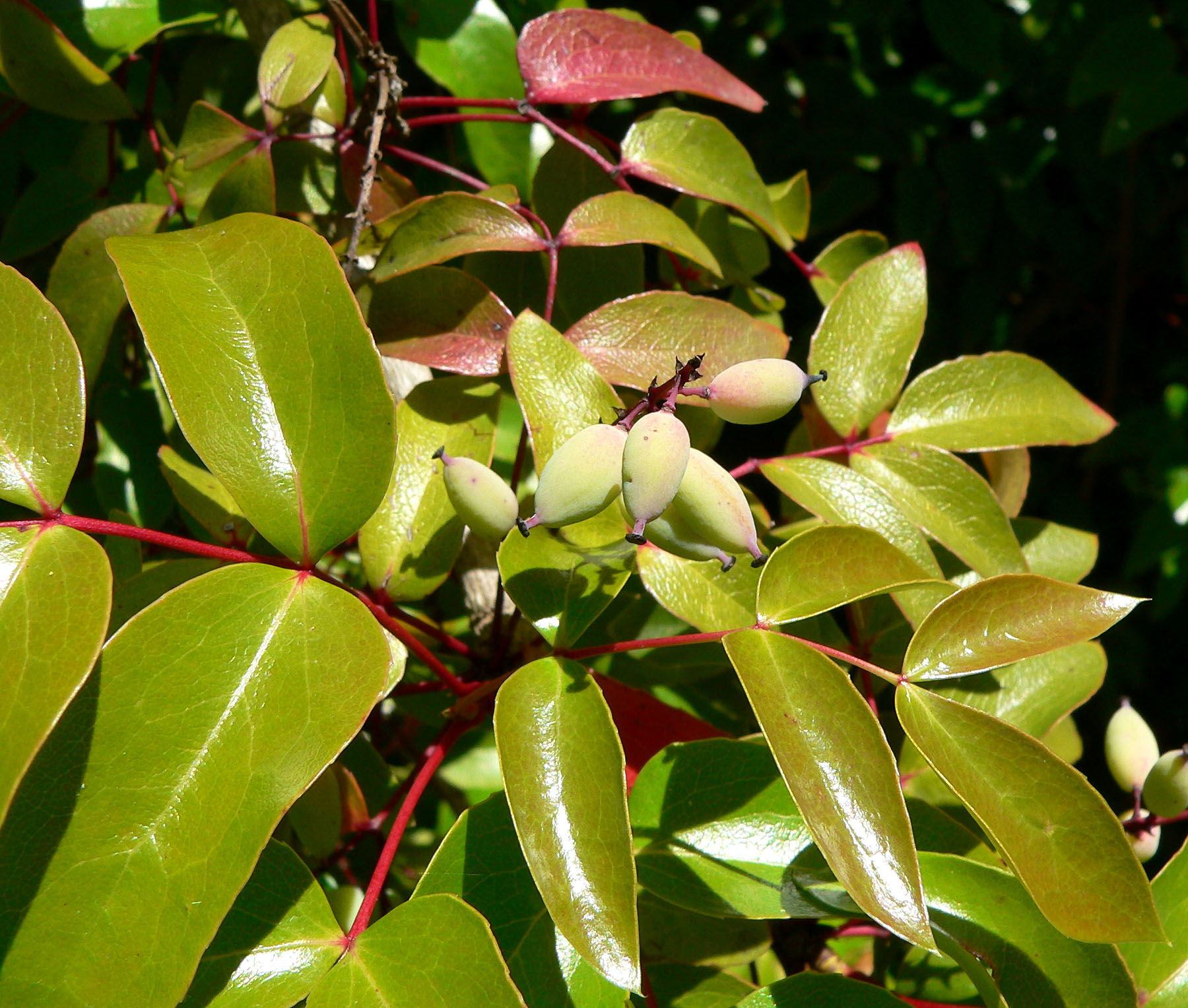

Scientific classification
- Kingdom: Plantae
- Clade: Tracheophytes
- Clade: Angiosperms
- Clade: Eudicots
- Order: Ranunculales
- Family: Berberidaceae
- Genus: Berberis
- Species: B. gracilis

Binomial name
- Berberis gracilis Hartw. ex Benth.

Synonyms
- Berberis gracilis var. madrensis Marroq. (1972); Mahonia gracilis (Hartw. ex Benth.) Bosse (1860); Mahonia subintegrifolia Fedde (1901); Odostemon gracilis (Hartw. ex Benth.) Standl. (1860)

= Berberis gracilis =

Species of shrub

Berberis gracilis is a plant species native to the Mexico, widely distributed from Tamaulipas to Oaxaca.

Berberis gracilis is a shrub. Leaves are pinnately compound with 4-7 pairs of leaflets plus a larger terminal leaflet, all lanceolate with teeth along the margins. Flowers are yellow 6-parted flowers, borne in an elongated raceme. Fruits are dark blue and egg-shaped.

== Taxonomy ==
Berberis gracilis was collected for scientific description by the German botanist Karl Theodor Hartweg. It was given its first complete description by the systematic botanist George Bentham and named by him in a book about Hartweg's expeditions titled Plantas Hartwegianas published in parts from 1839 to 1857. Though Bentham placed the species in genus Berberis, he also acknowledged the controversy over if certain species should be classified in Mahonia by placing that name in parentheses after Berberis for all the species he listed in the text.

The botanical disagreement continued for more than a century afterwards. In 1860, two alternative names were proposed; Julius Friedrich Wilhelm Bosse putting forward Mahonia gracilis and Paul Carpenter Standley publishing Odostemon gracilis. In 1997, Joseph Edward Laferrière summarized the arguments for Berberis being the correct classification and published a list of the species that should be moved. As of 2023, this is the name most commonly used by botanists.
