= Berberis paucijuga =

Scientific classification
- Kingdom: Plantae
- Clade: Tracheophytes
- Clade: Angiosperms
- Clade: Eudicots
- Order: Ranunculales
- Family: Berberidaceae
- Genus: Berberis
- Species: B. paucijuga

Binomial name
- Berberis paucijuga (C.Y.Wu ex S.Y.Bao) Laferr.

Synonyms
- Mahonia paucijuga C.Y.Wu ex S.Y.Bao

Species of shrub

Berberis paucijuga is a shrub in the family Berberidaceae described as a species in 1987. It is endemic to the province of Yunnan in southwestern China.

== Taxonomy ==
Berberis paucijuga was initially scientifically described and named Mahonia paucijuga by Wu Zhengyi however there were problems with description and it was corrected by Shi Ying Bao and correctly published in 1987. A paper published by Joseph Edward Laferrière in 1997 summarized the arguments for Mahonia being more properly classified as a synonym of Berberis renaming it Berberis paucijuga. As of 2023 this is the most common classification by botanists.
