= Berberis standleyi =

Scientific classification
- Kingdom: Plantae
- Clade: Tracheophytes
- Clade: Angiosperms
- Clade: Eudicots
- Order: Ranunculales
- Family: Berberidaceae
- Genus: Berberis
- Species: B. standleyi

Binomial name
- Berberis standleyi Marroq. & Laferr.

Synonyms
- Mahonia glauca Standl. & L.O.Williams 1997, not Berberis glauca DC. 1821

Species of shrub

Berberis standleyi is a shrub in the Berberidaceae described as a species in 1952. It was published with the name Mahonia glauca, a very different plant from Berberis glauca. Thus if one desires to consider Berberis and Mahonia as one genus instead of two, it is necessary to use a different name, i.e. Berberis standleyi.

The species is endemic to Honduras.
