= Berberis longipes =

Scientific classification
- Kingdom: Plantae
- Clade: Tracheophytes
- Clade: Angiosperms
- Clade: Eudicots
- Order: Ranunculales
- Family: Berberidaceae
- Genus: Berberis
- Species: B. longipes

Binomial name
- Berberis longipes (Standl.) Marroq. & Laferr.

Synonyms
- Mahonia longipes (Standl.) Standl.; Odostemon longipes Standl.

Species of shrub

Berberis longipes is a shrub in the family Berberidaceae, first described in 1918. It is native to the States of Durango, Sinaloa, Sonora, and Chihuahua in Mexico.
