= Berberis setosa =

Scientific classification
- Kingdom: Plantae
- Clade: Tracheophytes
- Clade: Angiosperms
- Clade: Eudicots
- Order: Ranunculales
- Family: Berberidaceae
- Genus: Berberis
- Species: B. setosa

Binomial name
- Berberis setosa (Gagnep.) Laferr.

Synonyms
- Mahonia setosa Gagnep. (1908)

Species of shrub

Berberis setosa is a shrub in the Berberidaceae described as a species in 1908. It is endemic to China, known from the provinces of Sichuan and Yunnan.

== Taxonomy ==
Berberis setosa was initially scientifically described and named Mahonia setosa by François Gagnepain. A paper published by Joseph Edward Laferrière in 1997 summarized the arguments for Mahonia being more properly classified as a synonym of Berberis renaming it Berberis setosa. As of 2023 this is the most common classification by botanists.
