= Berberis chochoco =

Shoshoko barberry

Scientific classification
- Kingdom: Plantae
- Clade: Tracheophytes
- Clade: Angiosperms
- Clade: Eudicots
- Order: Ranunculales
- Family: Berberidaceae
- Genus: Berberis
- Species: B. chochoco

Binomial name
- Berberis chochoco Schlecht.

Synonyms
- Mahonia chochoco (Schlecht.) Fedde; Odostemon chochoco (Schlecht.) Standl.; Chrysodendron tinctorium Terán & Berland.; Mahonia tinctoria (Terán & Berland.) I.M. Johnst.; Chrysodendron tinctorium var. oblongifolium Terán & Berland.; Chrysodendron tinctorium var. latifolium Terán & Berland.; Chrysodendron tinctorium var. longifolium Terán & Berland.

Species of shrub

Berberis chochoco is an evergreen shrub or small tree up to 9 m (30 ft) tall, in the genus Berberis, family Berberidaceae. It is native to mountainous regions of northeastern Mexico, in the states of Nuevo León, Veracruz, and San Luis Potosí.

The evergreen leaflets are oval to oblong, 35–55 mm (1.4–2.2 in) long, shiny with conspicuous venation. Fruits are blue. Wood is yellow and used for dyeing and tanning.

== Taxonomy ==
The compound leaves place this species in the group sometimes segregated as the genus Mahonia.

One obscure and long overlooked publication created a monospecific genus for this species, calling it Chrysodendron tinctorium. The same publication also erected three varieties based on minor variations in leaf shape.
