= Berberis temolaica =

Scientific classification
- Kingdom: Plantae
- Clade: Embryophytes
- Clade: Tracheophytes
- Clade: Spermatophytes
- Clade: Angiosperms
- Clade: Eudicots
- Order: Ranunculales
- Family: Berberidaceae
- Genus: Berberis
- Species: B. temolaica

Binomial name
- Berberis temolaica Ahrendt

Species of flowering plant

Berberis temolaica, called the blue barberry, is a species of flowering plant in the genus Berberis, native to Tibet and Myanmar. It has gained the Royal Horticultural Society's Award of Garden Merit.
