= Berberis longibracteata =

Scientific classification
- Kingdom: Plantae
- Clade: Tracheophytes
- Clade: Angiosperms
- Clade: Eudicots
- Order: Ranunculales
- Family: Berberidaceae
- Genus: Berberis
- Species: B. longibracteata

Binomial name
- Berberis longibracteata (Takeda) Laferr.

Synonyms
- Mahonia longibracteata Takeda

Species of shrub

Berberis longibracteata is a shrub in the family Berberidaceae, first described as a species in 1917. It is endemic to China, found in Sichuan and Yunnan Provinces.

== Taxonomy ==
Berberis longibracteata was initially scientifically described and named Mahonia longibracteata by Hisayoshi Takeda in 1917. A paper published by Joseph Edward Laferrière in 1997 summarized the arguments for Mahonia being more properly classified as a synonym of Berberis renaming it Berberis longibracteata. As of 2023 this is the most common classification by botanists.
