= Berberis agricola =

Dalai Lama's barberry 暗红小檗 an hong xiao bo

Scientific classification
- Kingdom: Plantae
- Clade: Tracheophytes
- Clade: Angiosperms
- Clade: Eudicots
- Order: Ranunculales
- Family: Berberidaceae
- Genus: Berberis
- Species: B. agricola

Binomial name
- Berberis agricola Ahrendt

Species of shrub

Berberis agricola is a plant species endemic to Tibet. It grows on mountain slopes at elevations of 3200–3600 m.

Berberis agricola is a deciduous shrub up to 2 m tall, with spines up to 15 mm long along the younger twigs. Leaves are obovate, up to 25 mm long, dark green above, lighter green below. Flowers are borne in a raceme of up to 30 flowers.
