= Berberis leptodonta =

Scientific classification
- Kingdom: Plantae
- Clade: Tracheophytes
- Clade: Angiosperms
- Clade: Eudicots
- Order: Ranunculales
- Family: Berberidaceae
- Genus: Berberis
- Species: B. leptodonta

Binomial name
- Berberis leptodonta Gagnep. (Laferr.)

Synonyms
- Mahonia leptodonta Gagnep.

Species of shrub

Berberis leptodonta is a shrub in the family Berberidaceae, first described in 1938. It is endemic to China, found in Sichuan and Yunnan Provinces.

== Taxonomy ==
Berberis leptodonta was initially scientifically described and named by François Gagnepain as Mahonia leptodonta in 1938. A paper published by Joseph Edward Laferrière in 1997 summarized the arguments for Mahonia being more properly classified as a synonym of Berberis renaming it Berberis leptodonta. As of 2023 this is the most common classification by botanists.
