= Berberis jujuyensis =

Scientific classification
- Kingdom: Plantae
- Clade: Tracheophytes
- Clade: Angiosperms
- Clade: Eudicots
- Order: Ranunculales
- Family: Berberidaceae
- Genus: Berberis
- Species: B. jujuyensis

Binomial name
- Berberis jujuyensis Job

Species of shrub

Berberis jujuyensis is a shrub in the Berberidaceae described as a species in 1953. It is native to Jujuy Province in northwestern Argentina and to nearby Tarija region of Bolivia.
