= Berberis xanthophlaea =

Conservation status
- Vulnerable (IUCN 3.1)

Scientific classification
- Kingdom: Plantae
- Clade: Tracheophytes
- Clade: Angiosperms
- Clade: Eudicots
- Order: Ranunculales
- Family: Berberidaceae
- Genus: Berberis
- Species: B. xanthophloea

Binomial name
- Berberis xanthophloea Ahrendt

Species of shrub

Berberis xanthophloea is a species of plant in the family Berberidaceae. It is endemic to China.
