= Berberis muelleri =

Scientific classification
- Kingdom: Plantae
- Clade: Tracheophytes
- Clade: Angiosperms
- Clade: Eudicots
- Order: Ranunculales
- Family: Berberidaceae
- Genus: Berberis
- Species: B. muelleri

Binomial name
- Berberis muelleri (I.M.Johnst.) Marroq. ex Laferr. & Marroq.

Synonyms
- Mahonia muelleri I.M.Johnst.

Species of shrub

Berberis muelleri is a shrub with compound leaves, native to the Mexican State of Nuevo León.

The compound leaves place this species in the group sometimes segregated as the genus Mahonia.
