= Berberis sikkimensis =

Sikkim barberry

Scientific classification
- Kingdom: Plantae
- Clade: Tracheophytes
- Clade: Angiosperms
- Clade: Eudicots
- Order: Ranunculales
- Family: Berberidaceae
- Genus: Berberis
- Species: B. sikkimensis

Binomial name
- Berberis sikkimensis (C.K.Schneid.) Ahrendt 1942

Synonyms
- Berberis chitria var. sikkimensis C.K.Schneid. 1915; Berberis sikkimensis var. baileyi Ahrendt; Berberis sikkimensis var. glabramea Ahrendt

Species of plant

Berberis sikkimensis is a plant species native to the high Himalayas at elevations of 2000–3000 m. It is known from Sikkim, Nepal, Bhutan, Tibet and Yunnan.

Berberis sikkimensis is a shrub up to 250 cm tall, with pale yellow spines up to 20 mm long on the younger twigs. Leaves are egg-shaped, up to 25 mm long, leathery, heavily whitened with a waxy layer below. Inflorescence is a panicle or raceme of up to 20 flowers. Berries are dark red, narrowly egg-shaped, up to 15 mm long.
