= Berberis chiapensis =

Scientific classification
- Kingdom: Plantae
- Clade: Tracheophytes
- Clade: Angiosperms
- Clade: Eudicots
- Order: Ranunculales
- Family: Berberidaceae
- Genus: Berberis
- Species: B. chiapensis

Binomial name
- Berberis chiapensis (Lundell) Lundell

Synonyms
- Mahonia chiapensis Lundell

Species of shrub

Berberis chiapensis is a flowering plant in the barberry family, Berberidaceae. This shrub was described as a species in 1940. It is endemic to the State of Chiapas in southern Mexico.
