= Berberis schochii =

Scientific classification
- Kingdom: Plantae
- Clade: Tracheophytes
- Clade: Angiosperms
- Clade: Eudicots
- Order: Ranunculales
- Family: Berberidaceae
- Genus: Berberis
- Species: B. schochii

Binomial name
- Berberis schochii (C.K.Schneid. ex Hand.-Mazz.) Laferr.

Synonyms
- Berberis nitens (C.K.Schneid.) Laferr. (1997); Mahonia nitens C.K.Schneid. (1913); Mahonia schochii C.K.Schneid. ex Hand.-Mazz. (1931)

Species of shrub

Berberis schochii is a shrub in the Berberidaceae described as a species in 1913. It is endemic to China, known from the provinces of Guizhou and Sichuan.

== Taxonomy ==
Berberis schochii was initially scientifically described and named by Camillo Karl Schneider as Mahonia nitens in 1913. A paper was published by Joseph Edward Laferrière in 1997 summarizing the arguments for Mahonia being more properly classified as a synonym of Berberis, but he also mistakenly published it as Berberis nitens an illegitimate name. As of 2023 the most classification by botanists is as Berberis schochii.
