= Berberis monyulensis =

Scientific classification
- Kingdom: Plantae
- Clade: Tracheophytes
- Clade: Angiosperms
- Clade: Eudicots
- Order: Ranunculales
- Family: Berberidaceae
- Genus: Berberis
- Species: B. monyulensis

Binomial name
- Berberis monyulensis (Ahrendt) Laferr.

Synonyms
- Mahonia monyulensis Ahrendt

Species of shrub

Berberis monyulensis is a shrub in the family Berberidaceae first described as a species in 1961. It is endemic to Tibet.

== Taxonomy ==
Berberis monyulensis was initially scientifically described and named by Leslie Walter Allen Ahrendt as Mahonia monyulensis. A paper was published by Joseph Edward Laferrière in 1997 summarizing the arguments for Mahonia being more properly classified as a synonym of Berberis included Mahonia monyulensis. As of 2023 this is the most common classification by botanists.
