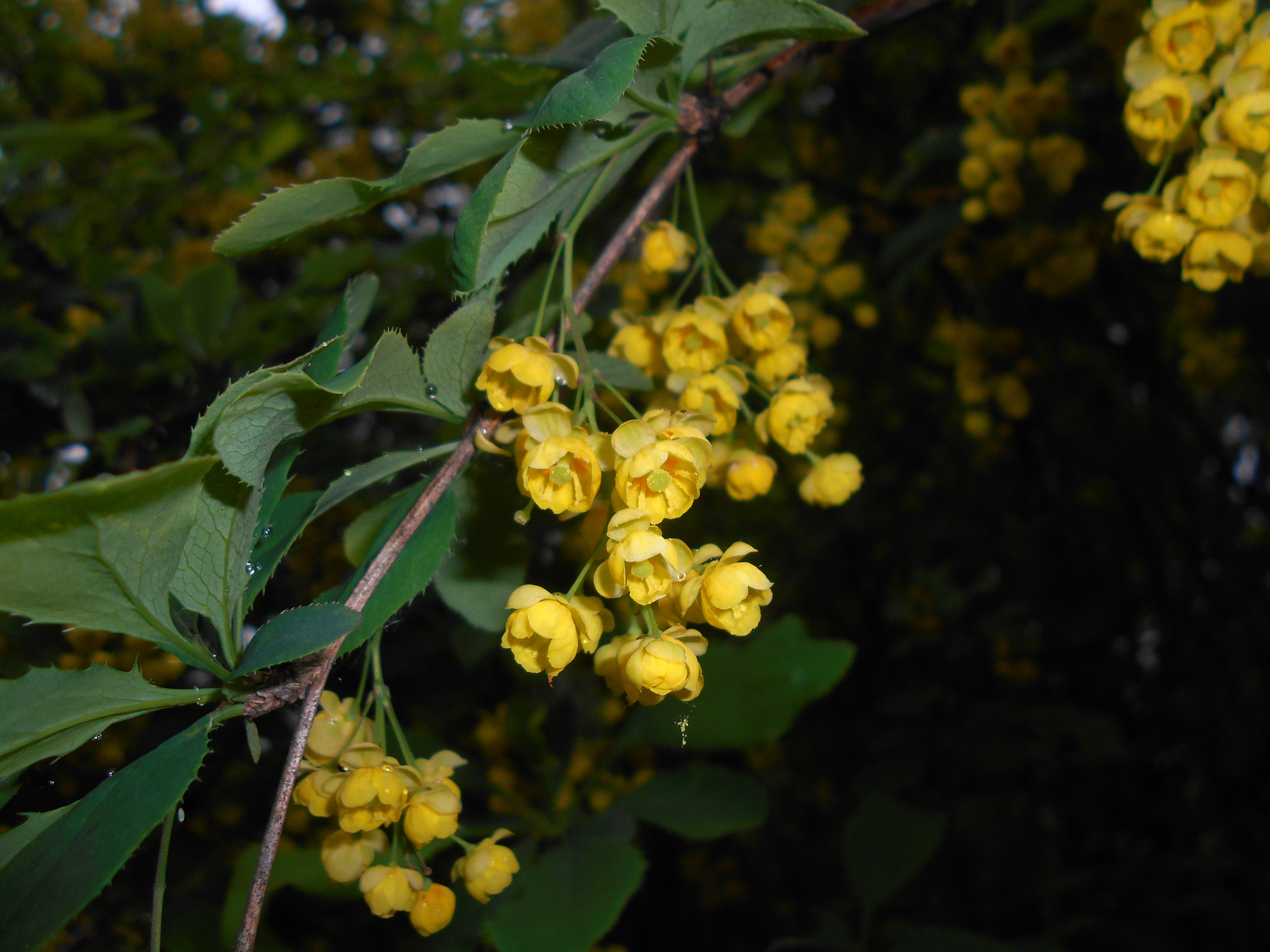
- Flowers and leaves
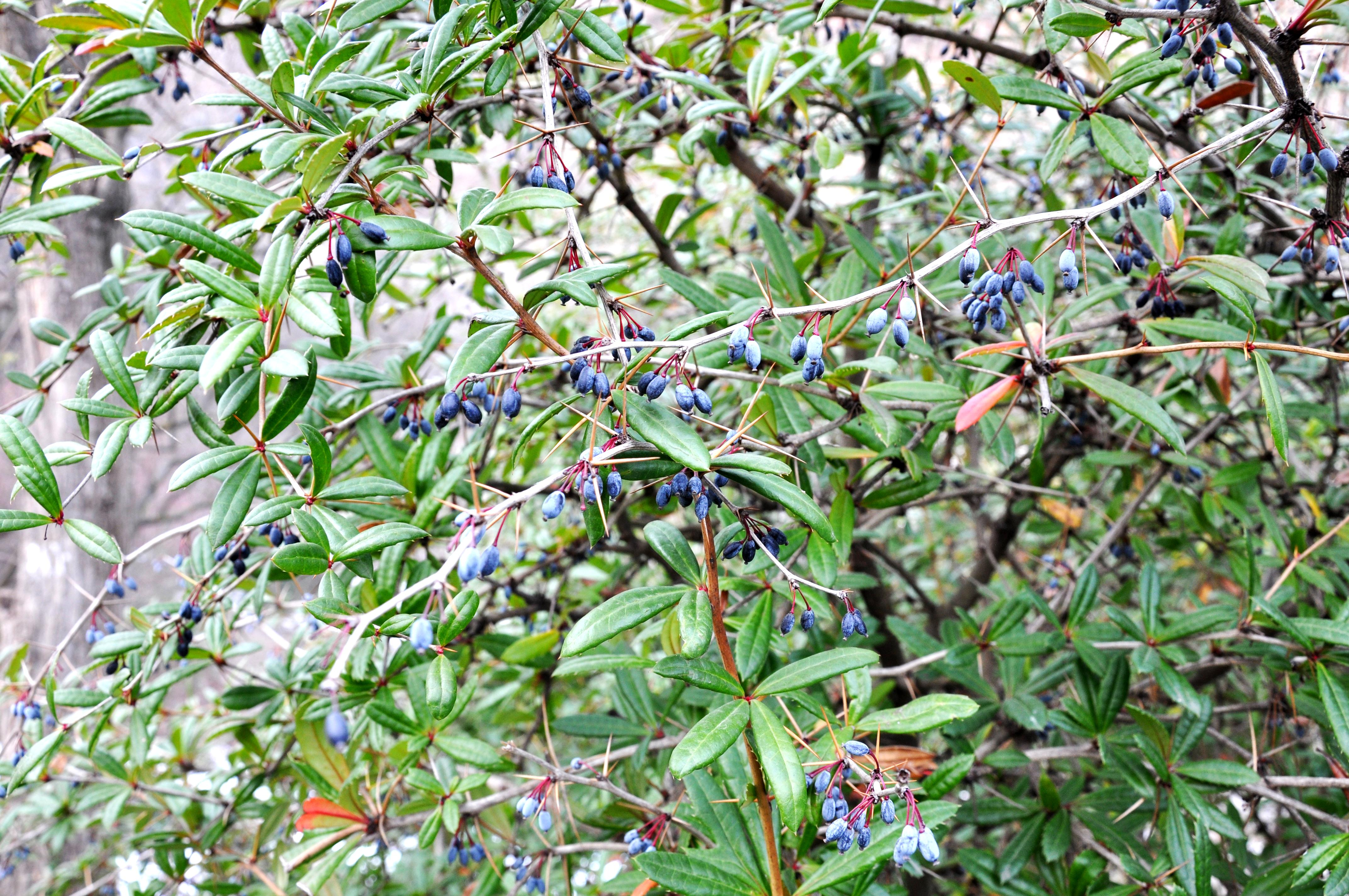
- In fruit

Scientific classification
- Kingdom: Plantae
- Clade: Tracheophytes
- Clade: Angiosperms
- Clade: Eudicots
- Order: Ranunculales
- Family: Berberidaceae
- Genus: Berberis
- Species: B. lycium

Binomial name
- Berberis lycium Royle

Synonyms
- List: Berberis afghanica C.K.Schneid.; Berberis angustifolia Roxb.; Berberis heteracantha Ahrendt; Berberis vulgaris f. lycium (Royle) Parsa

= Berberis lycium =

Species of plant in the barberry family

Berberis lycium, called the Indian lycium, Indian barberry, or boxthorn barberry, is a species of flowering plant in the family Berberidaceae. It is native to mountain slopes of the northwestern part of the Indian Subcontinent. A widespread species, its fruit, called kasmal, is edible and is eaten fresh, cooked, and preserved.
