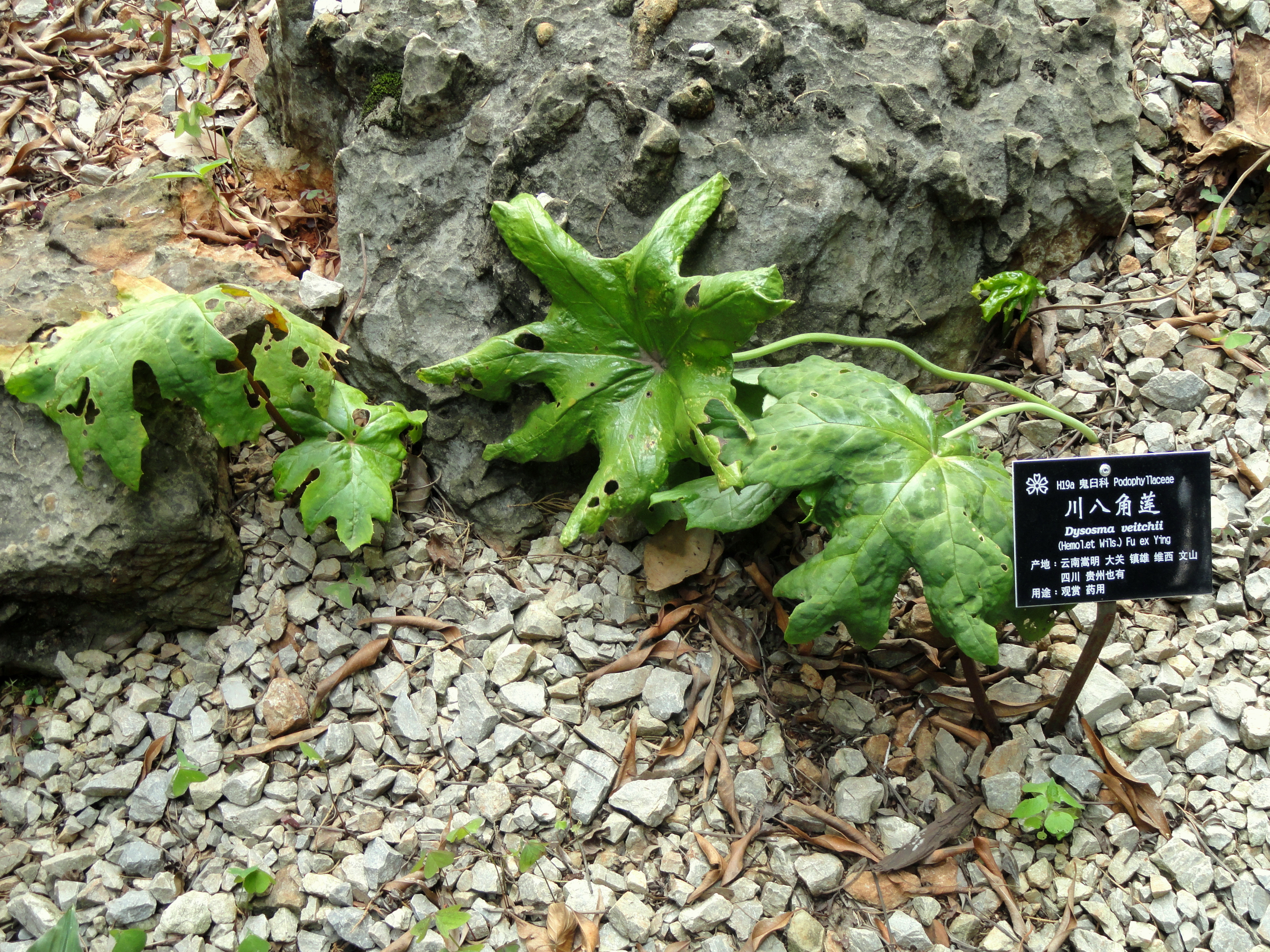
- Dysosma veitchii

Scientific classification
- Kingdom: Plantae
- Clade: Embryophytes
- Clade: Tracheophytes
- Clade: Spermatophytes
- Clade: Angiosperms
- Clade: Eudicots
- Order: Ranunculales
- Family: Berberidaceae
- Genus: Dysosma; Woodson

Type species
- Dysosma pleiantha (Hance) Woodson (holotype)

Synonyms
- Podophyllum sect. Dysosma (Woodson) Shaw

= Dysosma =

Genus of flowering plants in to the barberry family

Dysosma is a group of herbaceous perennials in the Berberidaceae or barberry family described as a genus in 1928. It is native to China and Indochina.

The genus is not universally recognised by this name, as some authorities include the plants in the genus Podophyllum. Dysosma is recognised by other authorities as including only those Podophyllum species which originate in China. Dysosma grow as perennial, rhizomatous wildflowers on the damp and humus-rich floors of deciduous forests. The single umbrella-shaped leaves grow on an erect stem that usually stands 12–24 inches (300–610 mm), but with height varying with species. The leaves may be completely green or mottled and flecked with purple; they have an entire or deeply serrated edge depending on species. The flowers are nodding and in a range of colours. The fruit is a dark red berry.

Species

1. Dysosma aurantiocaulis – Yunnan, possibly Myanmar – Endangered
2. Dysosma delavayi – Guizhou, Sichuan, Yunnan, Shaanxi
3. Dysosma difformis – Guangxi, Guizhou, Hubei, Hunan, Sichuan, Vietnam
4. Dysosma furfuracea – Yunnan
5. Dysosma guangxiensis – Guangxi
6. Dysosma lichuensis – Hubei
7. Dysosma majoensis – Guangxi, Guizhou, Hubei, Sichuan, Yunnan
8. Dysosma majorensis – Guangxi, Guizhou, Hubei, Sichuan
9. Dysosma pleiantha – Anhui, Fujian, Guangdong, Guangxi, Henan, Hubei, Hunan, Jiangxi, Sichuan, Taiwan, Zhejiang
10. Dysosma tsayuensis – Tibet – Endangered
11. Dysosma veitchii – Guizhou, Sichuan, Yunnan – Endangered
12. Dysosma versipellis – Anhui, Guangdong, Guangxi, Guizhou, Henan, Hubei, Hunan, Jiangxi, Shanxi, Yunnan, Zhejiang – Endangered
