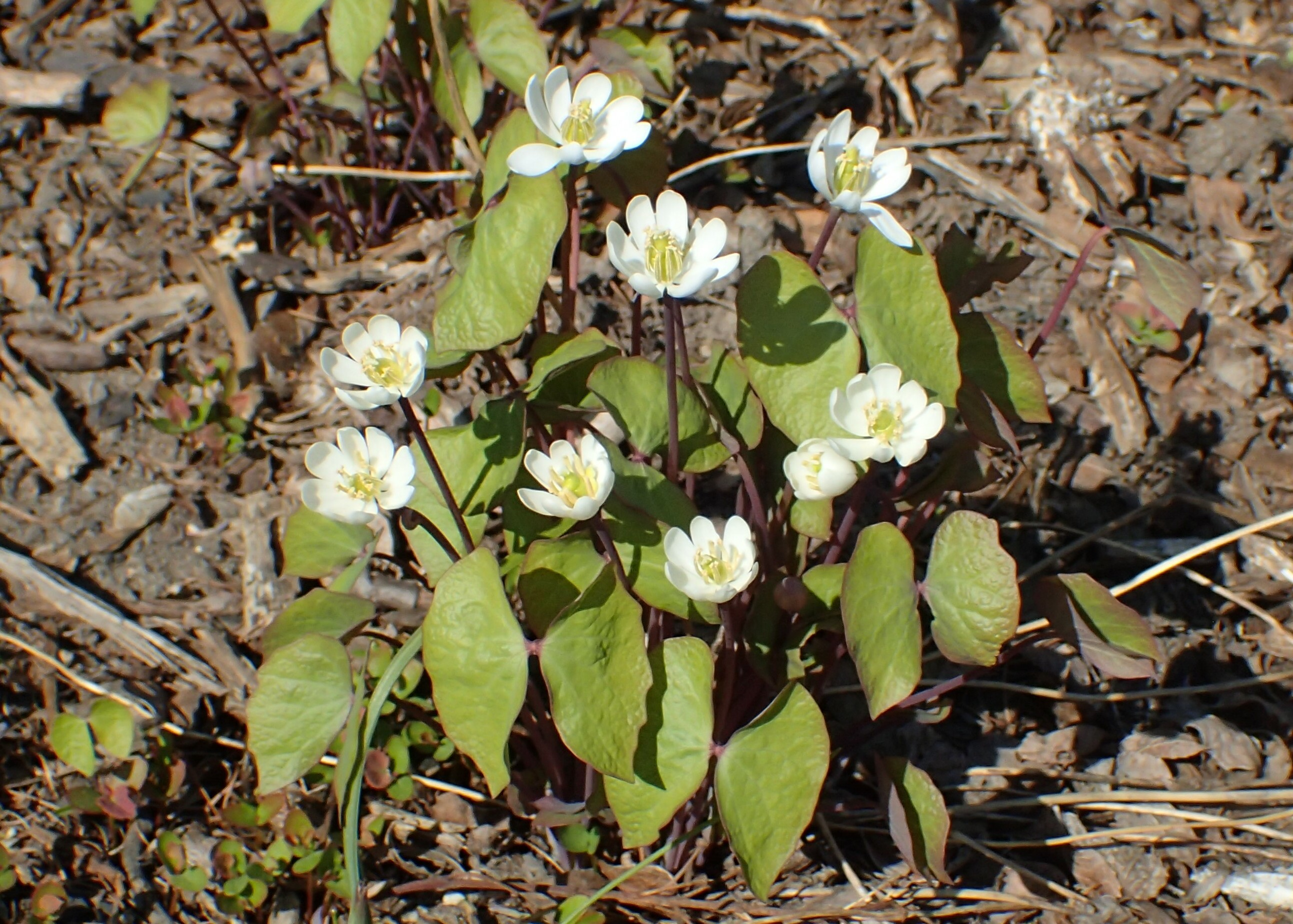

Scientific classification
- Kingdom: Plantae
- Clade: Tracheophytes
- Clade: Angiosperms
- Clade: Eudicots
- Order: Ranunculales
- Family: Berberidaceae
- Genus: Jeffersonia; Barton 1793 not Brickell 1800 (syn of Gelsemium in Loganiaceae)
- Species: J. diphylla

Binomial name
- Jeffersonia diphylla (L.) Pers.

= Jeffersonia =

Genus of flowering plants belonging to the barberry family

Jeffersonia, also known as twinleaf or rheumatism root, is a small genus of herbaceous perennial plants in the family Berberidaceae. The only species is Jeffersonia diphylla. They are uncommon spring wildflowers and grow in limestone soils of rich deciduous forests. Jeffersonia was named for United States President Thomas Jefferson by his contemporary Benjamin Smith Barton. This genus was formerly grouped in genus Podophyllum. Twinleaf is protected by state laws as a threatened or endangered plant in Georgia, Iowa, New York, and New Jersey.

== Description ==
Jeffersonia diphylla has leaves and flowers that are smooth and emerge directly from the rhizome. The leaves are divided into two leaflets which are half-ovate in shape with entire or shallowly toothed margins. It has showy white flowers with four sepals, eight petals, eight stamens, and a singly pistil; the flower resembles bloodroot flowers. The short-lived flower appears in April or May before the forest canopy appears (see spring ephemeral). The fruit is a green pear-shaped capsule with a hinged top. The characteristic leaves are large and nearly divided in half, giving rise to its common name, twinleaf. It rarely grows taller than 12 inches (30 cm). As with other deciduous forest plants, the seeds are dispersed by ants, a process known as myrmecochory.

== Species ==
Accepted species

- Jeffersonia diphylla (L.) Pers. – Eastern North America especially Great Lakes region, Ohio Valley, and Appalachians

Unresolved names

- Jeffersonia dubia (Maxim.) Benth. & Hook. f. ex Baker & Moore – China, Korea, Russia (called Plagiorhegma dubium in Flora of China)
- Jeffersonia lobata Nutt.
- Jeffersonia odorata Raf.

Species in homonymic genus

In 1800, Brickell used the name Jeffersonia to refer to some plants in the Loganiaceae, thus creating an illegitimate homonym. Species names coined using this illegitimate use of the name:

- Jeffersonia sempervirens Brickell, now called Gelsemium sempervirens (L.) J.St.-Hil

== Distribution and habitat ==
Jeffersonia diphylla is native to Eastern North America where it is found from Minnesota east to New York and south to Tennessee. In Minnesota it grows in the lower southeastern section of the state in mesic deciduous forests and most commonly in ravines or on talus slopes. In Minnesota it has a preference for growing on calcareous soils of north and east-facing slopes and is listed as a threatened species. In Minnesota it is found in association with other uncommon woodland plants such as Hydrastis canadensis (golden seal) and Dicentra canadensis (squirrel-corn).

== Uses ==
Jeffersonia has had a variety of medical uses. One is hinted at by an archaic common name of Jeffersonia diphylla, Rheumatism root. The roots of both species contain berberine, a known anti-tumor alkaloid. The plant is therefore considered poisonous.

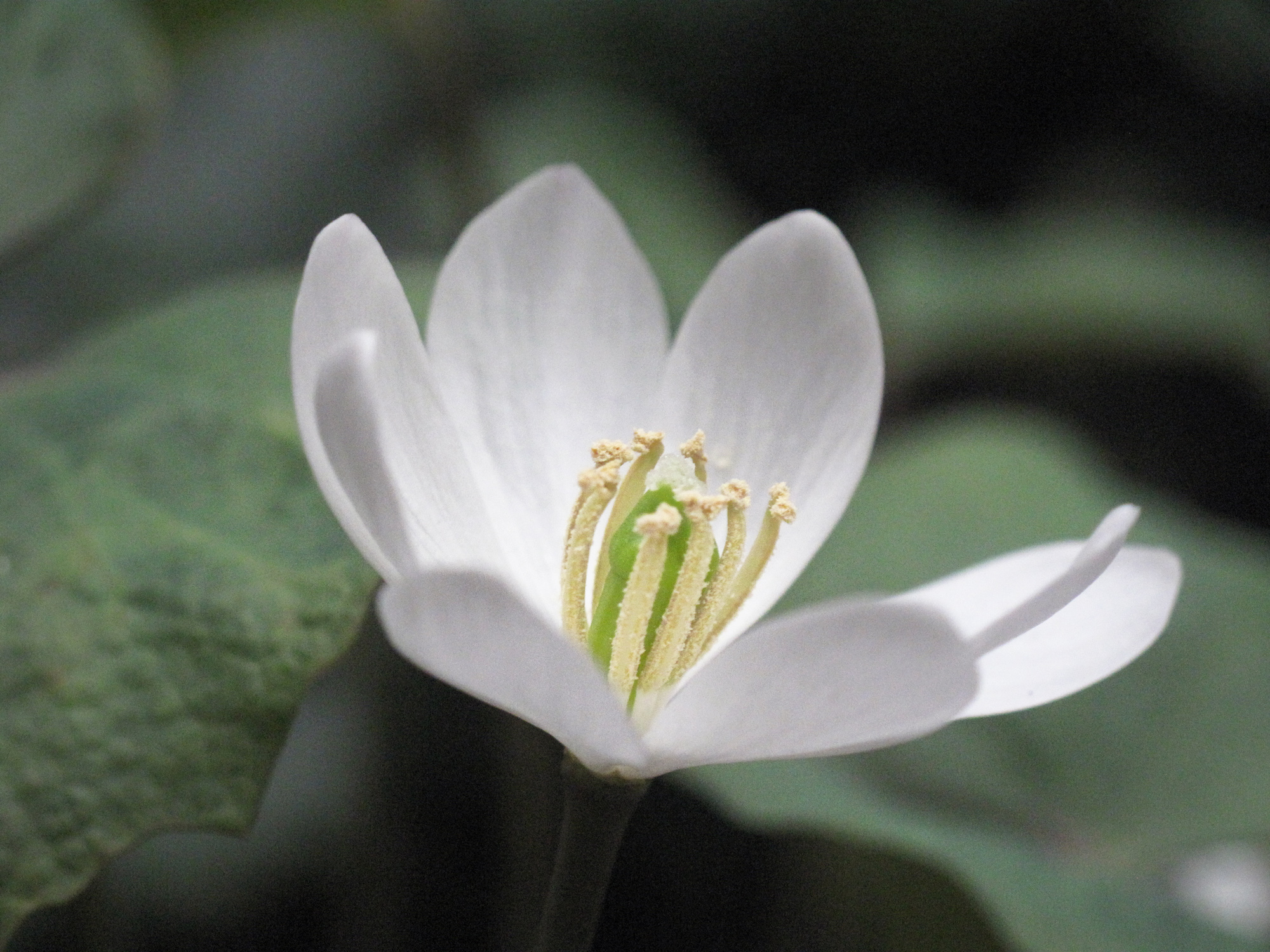
A specimen of Jeffersonia diphylla in bloom.

=== America ===
Native Americans use Jeffersonia diphylla for a variety of medicines.

The Cherokee use an infusion of this plant for treating dropsy, as well as gravel and urinary tract problems, and as a poultice for sores and inflammation.

The Iroquois used a decoction of the plant to treat gall and diarrhea.

The whole plant was used in early American medicine as an antispasmodic, diuretic, emetic, expectorant and general tonic. The "root" was once also used as an emetic in large doses, and as an expectorant in small doses. Modern medicine does not use this plant.
