= DaWu Mountain =

Mountain in Guangdong, China

DaWu mountain
- Location within Guangdong

Highest point
- Peak: Datian Peak
- Elevation: 1,703 m (5,587 ft)
- Coordinates: 22°14′N 111°15′E

Naming
- Native name: 大雾岭 (Chinese)

Geography
- Country: China
- Province: Guangdong
- City: Maoming
- 大雾岭官网

DaWu Mountain (Chinese: 大雾岭; pinyin: Dàwù Lǐng) is a mountain of historical and cultural significance located north of the city of Xinyi in Guangdong province, China. The tallest peak is the Datian Peak (simplified Chinese: 大田顶; traditional Chinese: 大田頂; pinyin: Dàtián Dǐng), as the tallest peak in the west of Guangdong province, which is commonly reported as 1703.8 metres (5,588 ft) tall.

DaWu Mountain is associated with the Dawu Mountain Nature Reserve, which was declared as a municipal natural reserve by Xinyi Government in 1994, promoted as a provincial natural reserve. It is known for its plant resources and scenery.

== Geography ==
The area is located in southwest Guangdong, just north of the city of Xinyi and to the south of the city of Gaozhou, located at 22°14′N to 22°17′N and 118°8′E to 111°15′E. It extends from 800 to 1704 metres (2,624 to 5,588 ft) above sea level and covers an area of 3534 hectares (35.3 sq mi) at its base. The Datian Peak is 1703.8 metres (5,588 ft), and the second tallest peak is 1423 metres (4,667 ft).

=== Climate ===
The climate is warm and humid. The area is natural boundary in tropic and subtropics of South China. The yearly average temperature is between 17 °C to 18 °C, the annual precipitation is between 2300 mm to 2600 mm and the annual average relative humidity is about 85%.

== Natural resources ==
The area is between the tropical zone and the subtropical zone, and is a transitional zone with distribution of various flora in south China. With superior natural condition, the Dawu Mountain Nature Reserve, as one of the most well-preserved natural ecological systems in southwest Guangdong, abounds in animal and plant resources, including a wild range of rare species, and contains tremendous economic plant resources.

=== Vegetation ===
The forest coverage of this area is about 98%, and plant resources are rich. There are 195 families, 703 genera, and 1453 species of wild higher plants, of which 20 species are under national protection and three species are under provincial protection. There are over 500 species of medicinal plants, including Gynostemma pentaphyllum, Paris polyphylla, Dysosma versipellis, and Dendrobium nobile, which are renowned throughout the country. Some trees are very old and famous, notably the Han Dynasty Cypresses (planted 2,100 years ago by Emperor Wu Di of the Han dynasty), 'Welcoming Guest Pine' (500 years old) and 'Fifth Rank Pine' (named by Emperor Qin Shi Huang of the Qin dynasty and replanted some 250 years ago).

=== Rare animals ===
The first class protected animals include leopards, Elliot's pheasants, yellow-bellied pheasants, monitor lizards, and boas. The second class protected animals include crested serpent eagles, Palea steindachneri, Hoplobatrachus tigerinus, giant salamanders, pangolins, rasses, and golden cats.

== Natural landscape ==
The area is 38 km (24 mi) from downtown XinYi city. It is one of eight scenic spots of XinYi. Because its southeast side is influenced by the Pacific climate, it experiences drastic temperature changes, so that the clouds and mist drift through the mountains.

== Local legend ==
In ancient times, a tremendous jade called south jade was said to be at the bottom of the lake. It was said that people who bathed in that lake would have bright white skin. Seven fairies from the welkin spent a whole day bathing in that lake on midsummer every year. One year, a cowboy grazing his cattle and horses near the lake saw the fairies bathing. When one of the fairies learned they had been seen, she breathed on the lake surface, causing the mountain to be surrounded by wind and fog so that the cowboy was not able to see them at all, which is the reason for the name of DaWu mountain.
