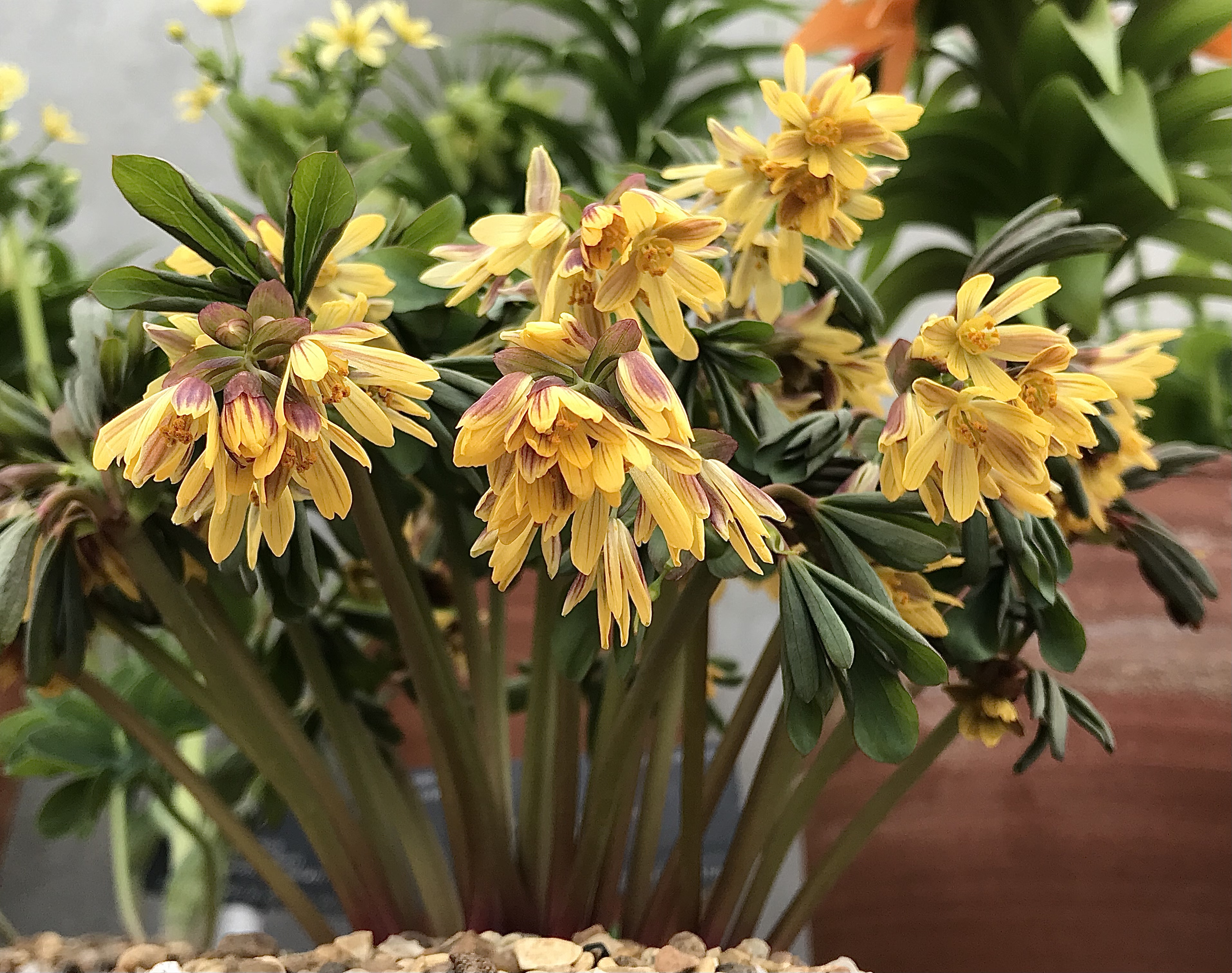
- Gymnospermium albertii flowering in the Alpine House, Kew Gardens

Scientific classification
- Kingdom: Plantae
- Clade: Embryophytes
- Clade: Tracheophytes
- Clade: Angiosperms
- Clade: Eudicots
- Order: Ranunculales
- Family: Berberidaceae
- Genus: Gymnospermium
- Species: G. albertii

Binomial name
- Gymnospermium albertii (Regel) Takht.

= Gymnospermium albertii =

Species of flowering plant

Gymnospermium albertii (syn. Leontice alberti) is a species in the genus Gymnospermium in the family Berberidaceae.

== Description ==
Tuberous perennial.

- Height: Flowering stems to about 15 cm high.
- Leaves: Lobed, with five leaflets. Leaves are bronze-tinged and rolled lengthways when young, expanding and turning pale green with maturity.
- Inflorescences:
  - Raceme: Pendent at first, later becoming upright. Densely flowered.
  - Flowers: Each flower measures up to 2.5 cm (1 in) in diameter when fully open, but they are more frequently seen in the earlier bell-shaped stage of openness. Flowers are bright yellow with a coppery red exterior.

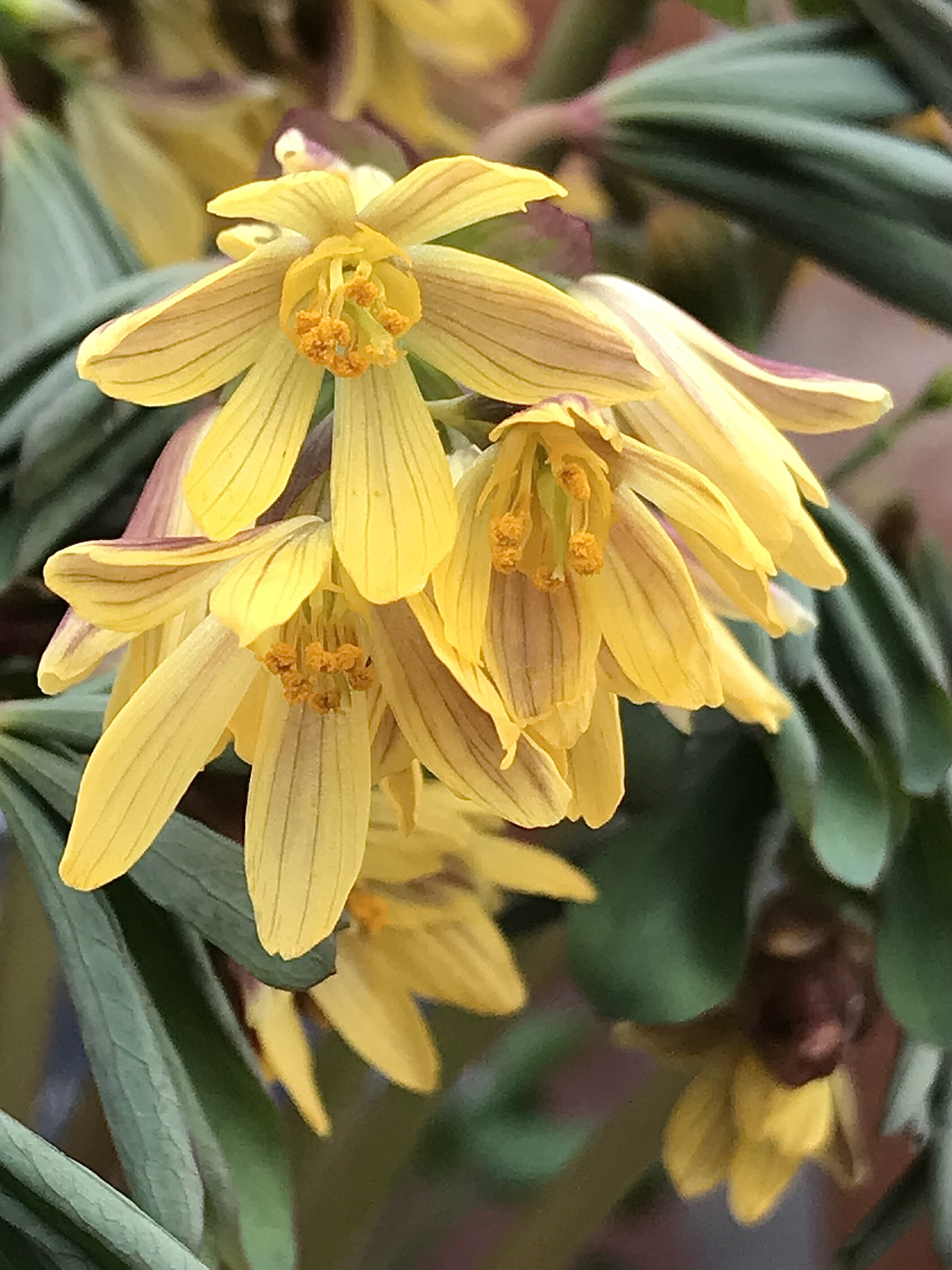
Close-up of flowers, Kew Gardens

== Range ==
It is native to rocky hillsides in Central Asia (Uzbekistan, Tajikistan, Turkmenistan, and Kazakhstan).

== Cultivation ==
Easily raised from seed. Very hardy. Successful in open, well-drained soil. Grows well in unheated glasshouses.

== Etymology ==
Gymnospermium derived from Greek, meaning 'naked seed'. Albertii is named for Johann Albert Von Regel, collector of the type specimen and son of the author of the species, Eduard August von Regel.

== Gallery ==
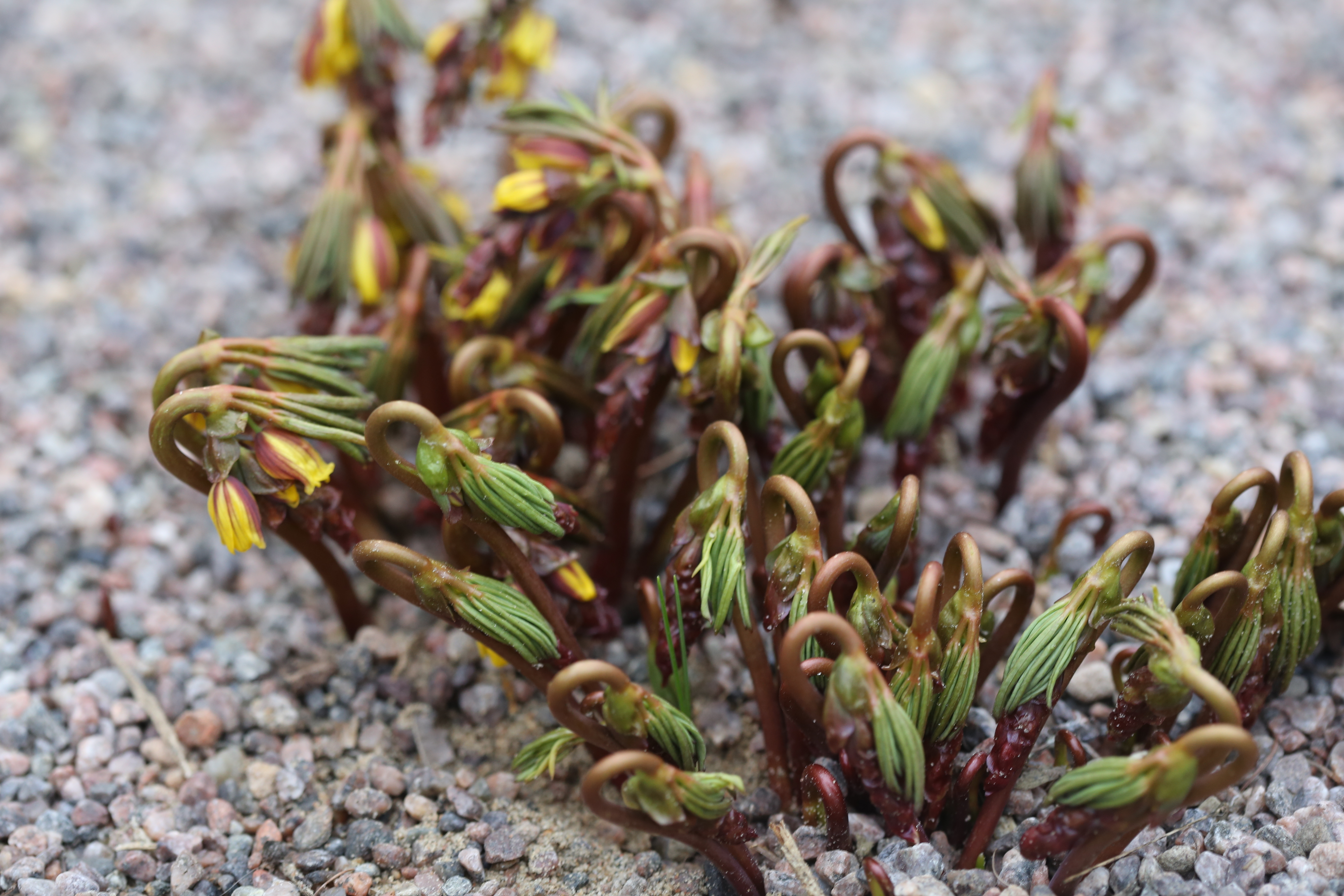
Container plant showing flower buds and tightly furled leaves, Gothenburg Botanical Garden

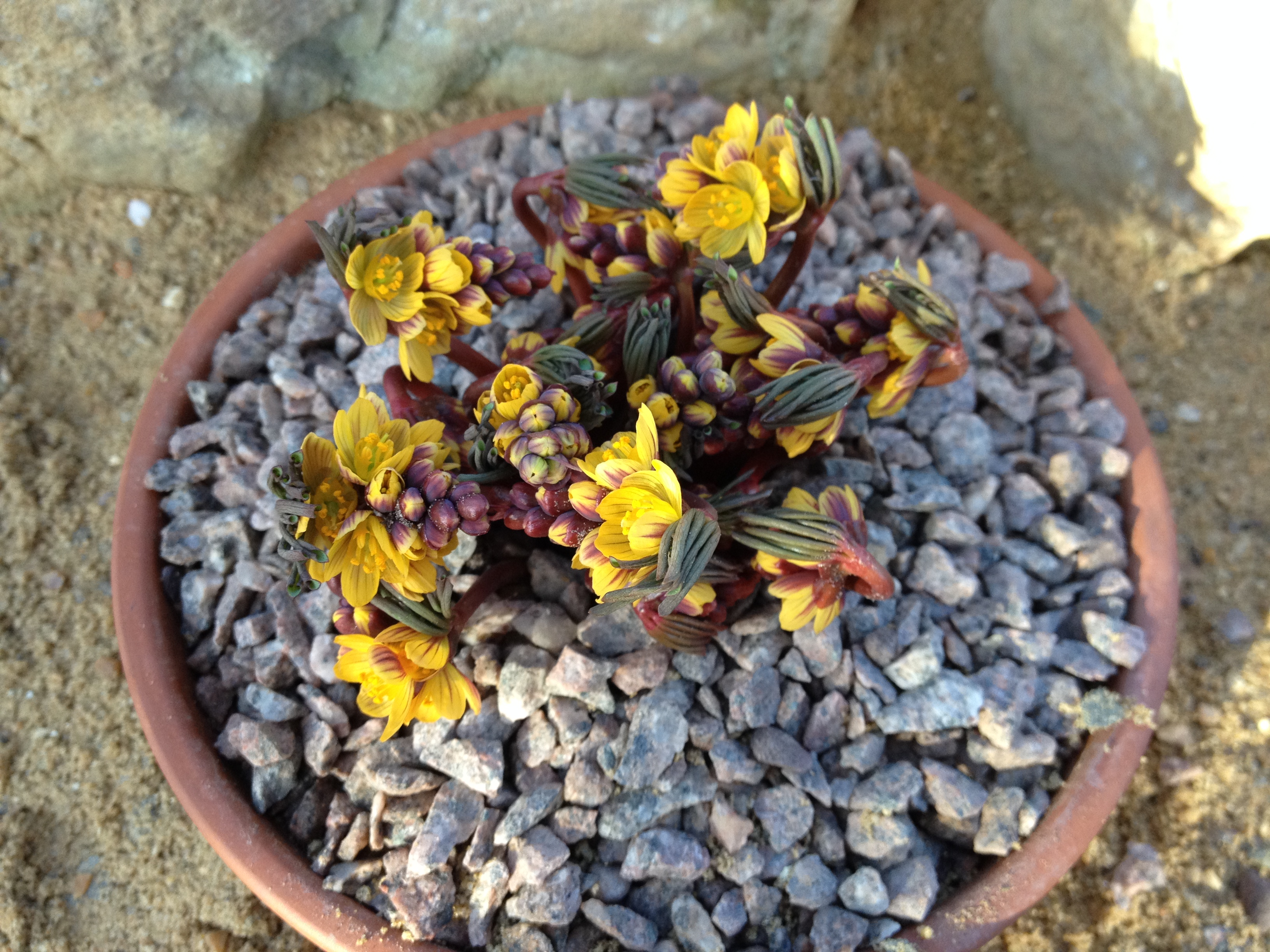
Container plant coming into bloom (leaves not yet unfurled), Alpine House, RHS Garden, Wisley

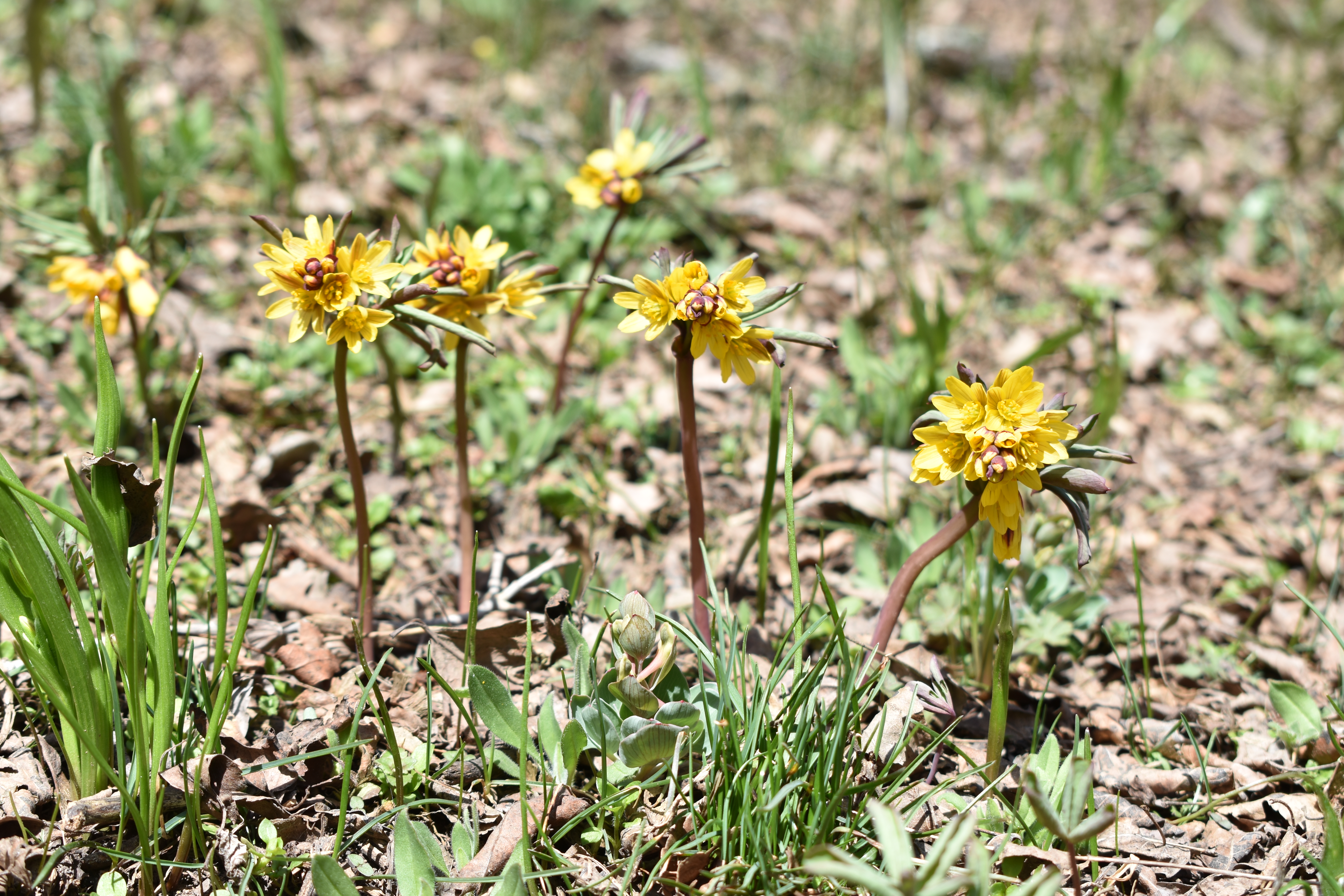
Young flowering stems of wild plant

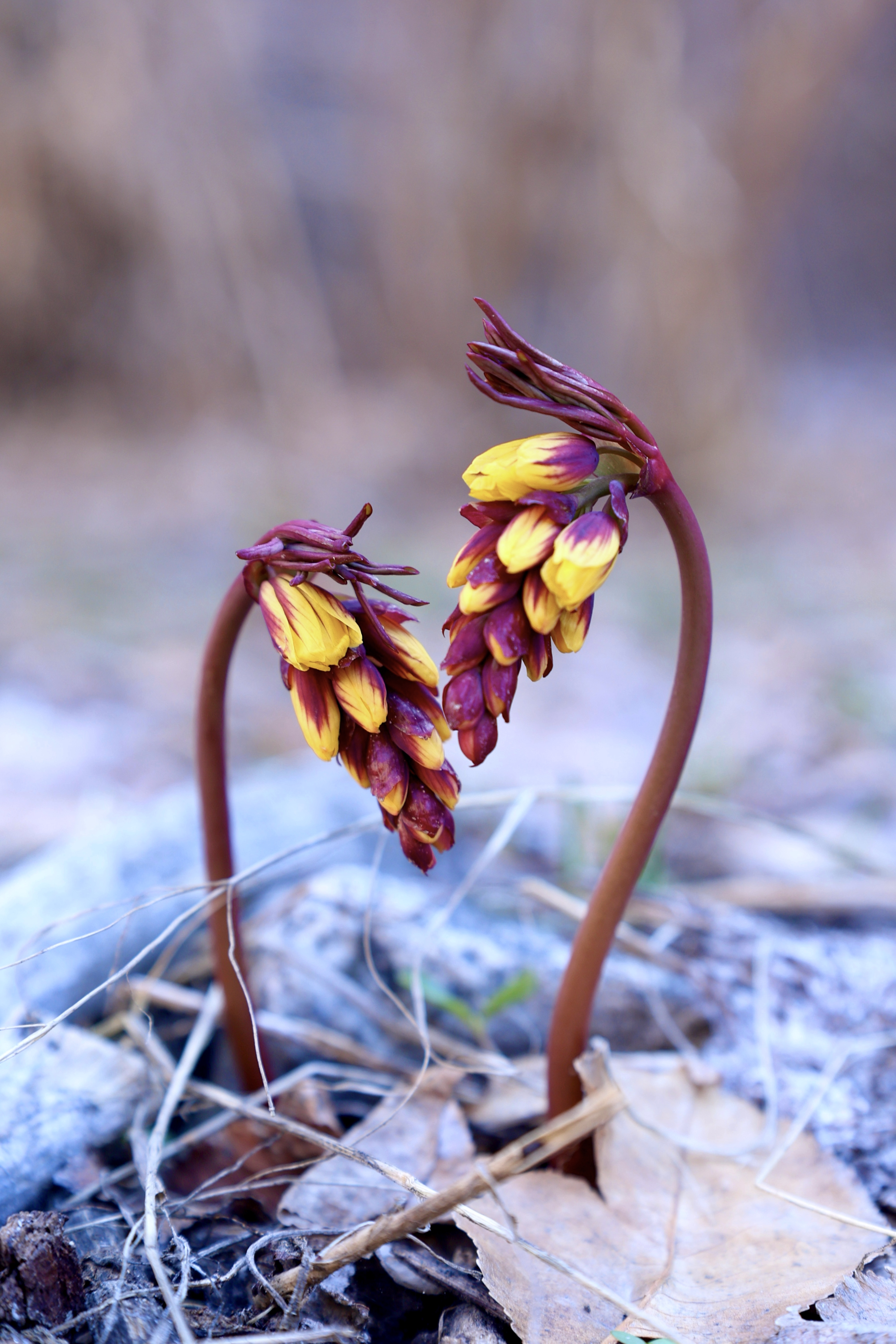
Gymnospermum albertii in Ugam-Chatkal National Park: Tashkent Region
