= Berberis glauca =

Scientific classification
- Kingdom: Plantae
- Clade: Tracheophytes
- Clade: Angiosperms
- Clade: Eudicots
- Order: Ranunculales
- Family: Berberidaceae
- Genus: Berberis
- Species: B. glauca

Binomial name
- Berberis glauca DC. 1821 not Mahonia glauca Standl. & L.O. Williams 1952

Species of shrub

Berberis glauca is a shrub in the Berberidaceae described as a species in 1821. It is native to Ecuador and Colombia.
