= Gustav Heinrich von Bongard =

German botanist (1786–1839)

- Born: 12 September 1786; Bonn, Holy Roman Empire
- Died: 1839
- Known for: First description of Sitka Spruce, Red Alder and other species; Observations sur la végétation de l'ile de Sitcha
- Scientific career
- Fields: Botany
- Workplaces: Saint Petersburg, Russia
- Author abbrev. (botany): Bong.

August Gustav Heinrich von Bongard (12 September 1786 – 1839) was a German botanist who worked in Saint Petersburg, Russia.

Born in Bonn, he was among the first botanists to identify plants emerging from Russian-controlled Alaska, mostly collected by Carl Mertens at Sitka, Alaska. Many species are now of major commercial importance like Sitka Spruce and Red Alder.

He is commemorated by the plant genus Bongardia (family Berberidaceae).

== Selected writings ==
- Observations sur la végétation de l'ile de Sitcha, 1833
- Esquisse historique des travaux sur la botanique entrepris en Russie depuis, 1834
- Genera plantarum ad familias suas redacta (with Carl Bernhard von Trinius), 1835.
- "Historical Sketch of the Progress of Botany in Russia from the Time of Peter the Great to the Present Day", (translated from the "Recueil Des Actes de Pétersbourg de 1834"); Curtis's Botanical Magazine. Companion to the Botanical Magazine ... By W.J. Hooker. Vol. 1. pp. 117–186, (1836)
- Plantae quatuor brasilienses novae (with Carl Bernhard von Trinius), 1839.
- Verzeichniß der im Jahre 1838 am Saisang-Nor und am Irtysch gesammelten Pflanzen, A second supplement to "Flora Altaica" (with Carl Anton von Meyer and Karl Friedrich von Ledebour), 1841.
