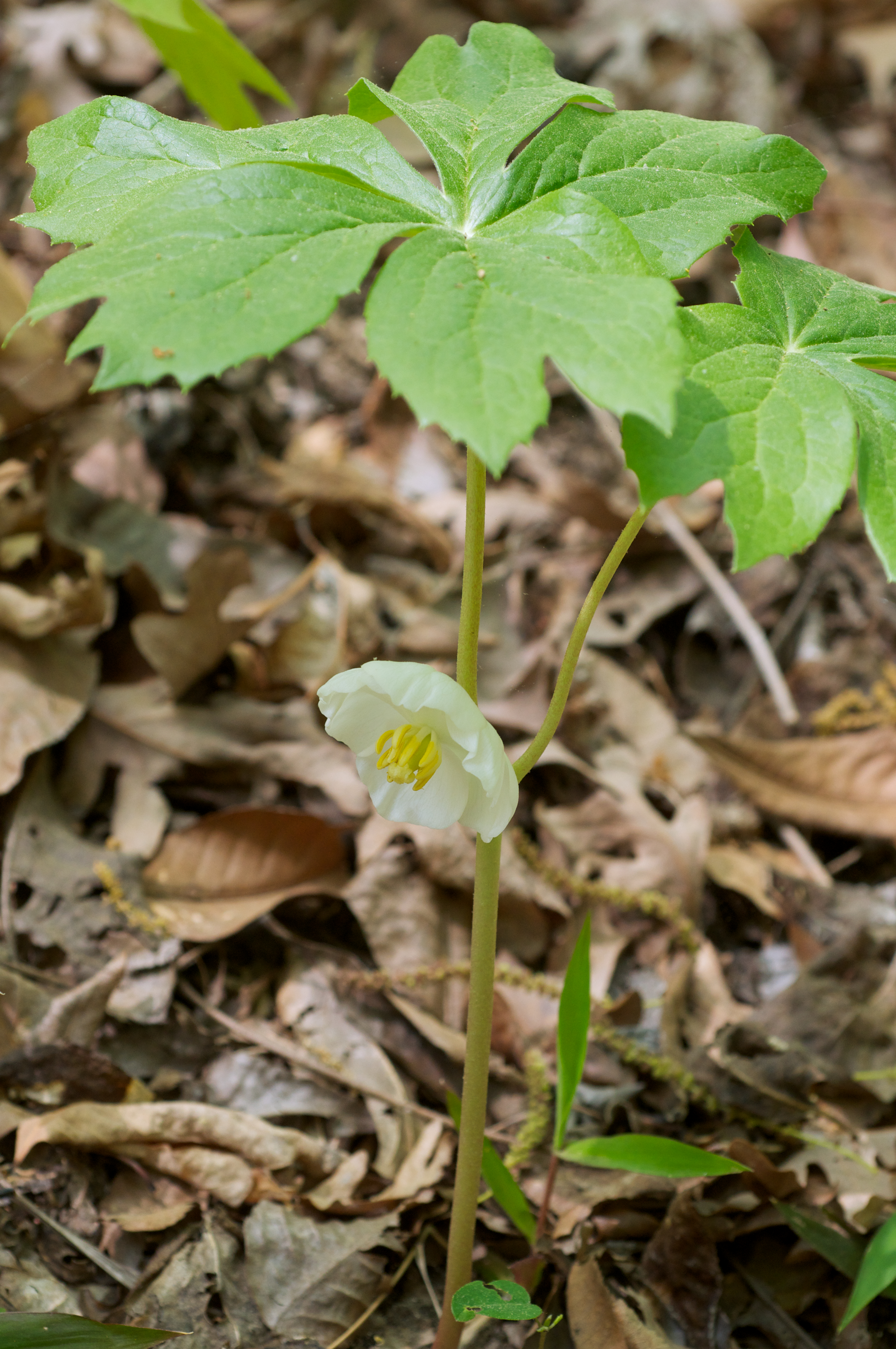
- Podophyllum peltatum

Scientific classification
- Kingdom: Plantae
- Clade: Embryophytes
- Clade: Tracheophytes
- Clade: Angiosperms
- Clade: Eudicots
- Order: Ranunculales
- Family: Berberidaceae
- Genus: Podophyllum; L.

Species
- See text

Synonyms
- Anapodophyllon Mill.; Diphylleia Michx.; Dysosma Woodson; Sinopodophyllum T.S.Ying

= Podophyllum =

Genus of plants

Podophyllum is a genus of flowering plant in the family Berberidaceae, native from Afghanistan to China, and from southeast Canada to the central and eastern United States. The genus was first described by Carl Linnaeus in 1753.

== Taxonomy ==
The taxonomic status of the genus has varied. Some sources transferred all but Podophyllum peltatum to other genera, such as Dysosma and Sinopodophyllum. As of October 2022, Plants of the World Online regarded these genera as synonyms of Podophyllum.

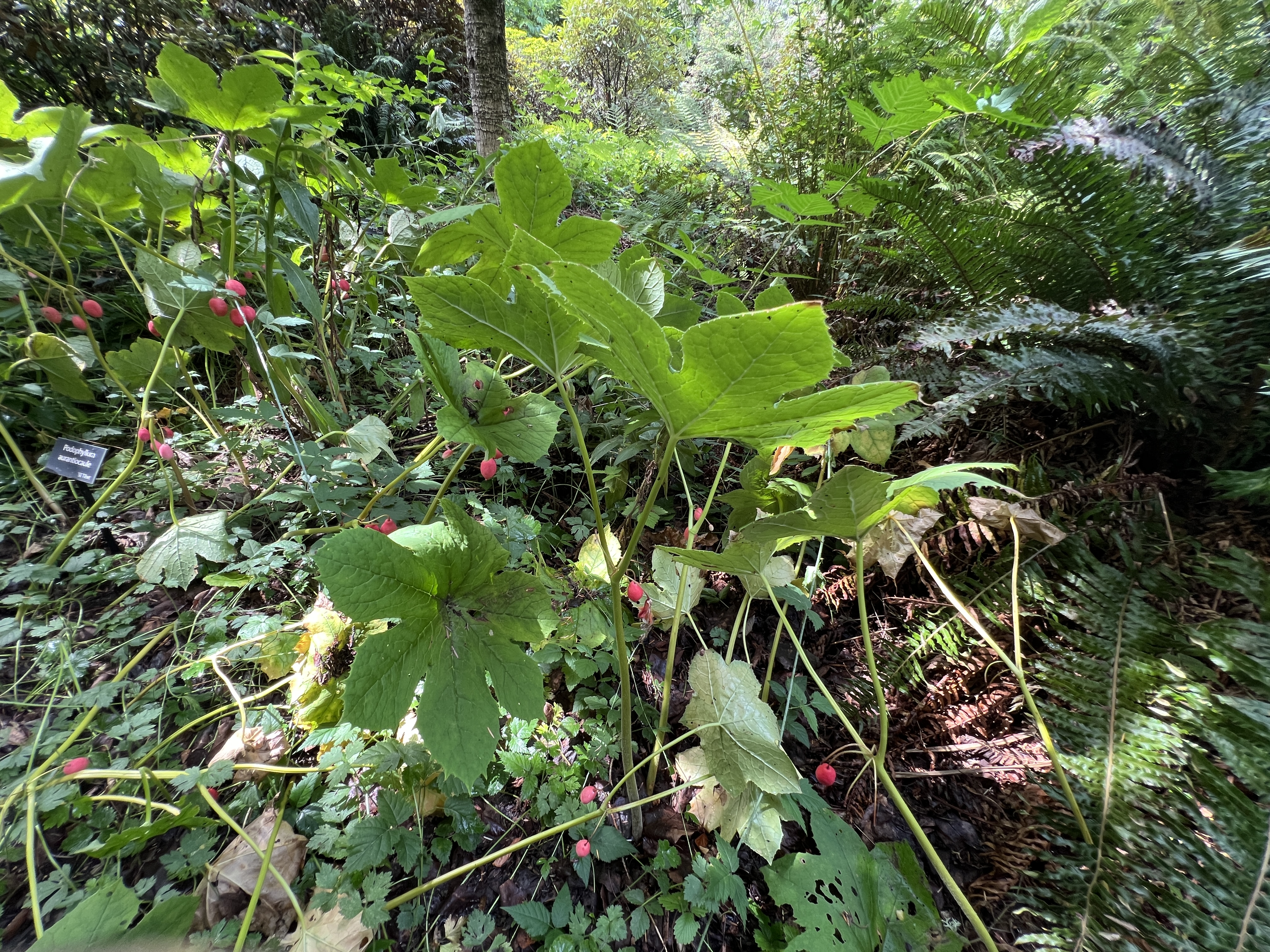
Podophyllum aurantiocaule

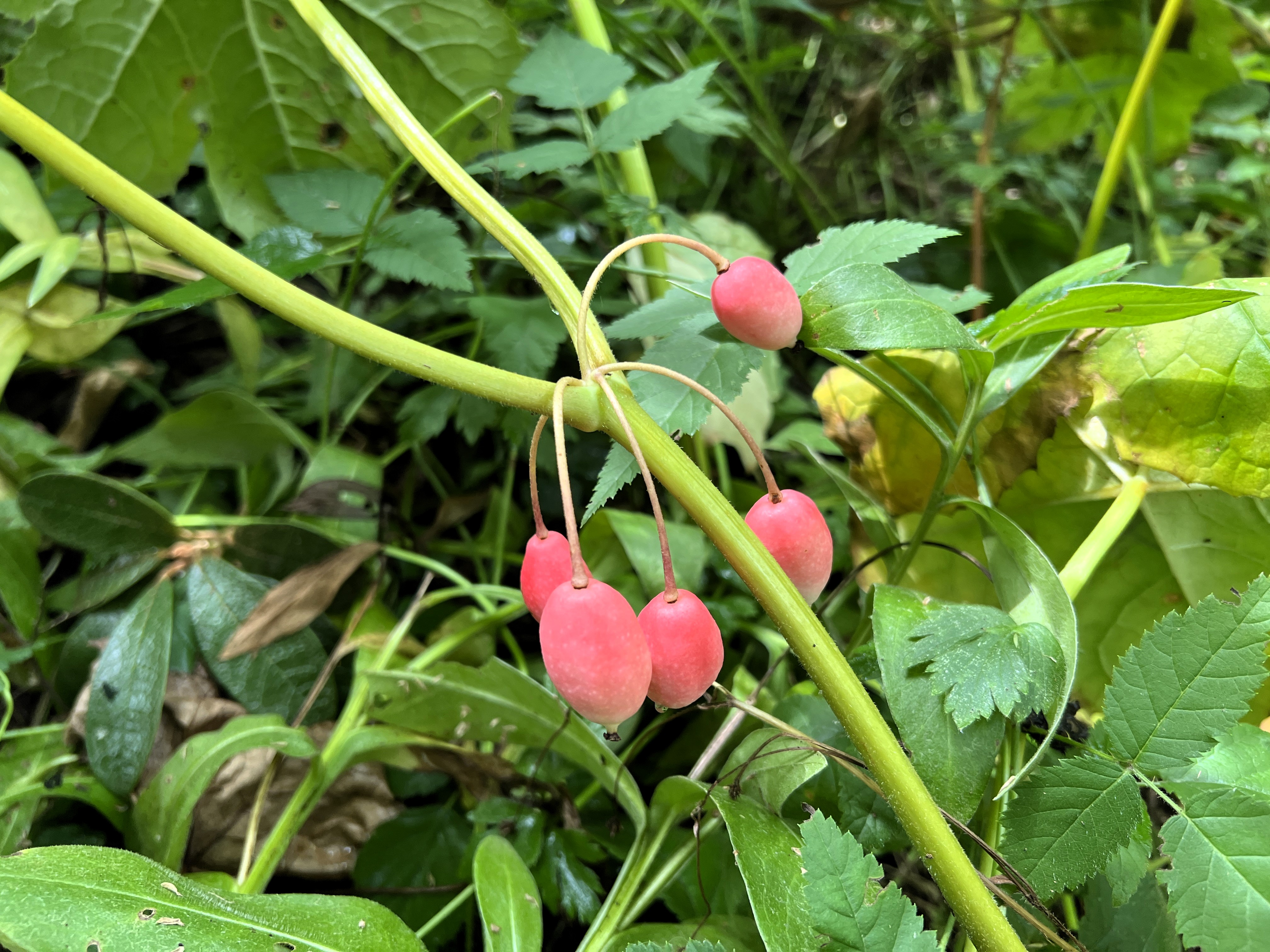
Podophyllum aurantiocaule

=== Species ===
As of October 2022, Plants of the World Online accepted the following species:

- Podophyllum aurantiocaule Hand.-Mazz.
- Podophyllum cymosum (Michx.) Christenh. & Byng
- Podophyllum delavayi Franch.
- Podophyllum difforme Hemsl. & E.H.Wilson
- Podophyllum emeiense (J.L.Wu & P.Zhuang) J.M.H.Shaw
- Podophyllum glaucescens J.M.H.Shaw
- Podophyllum grayi (F.Schmidt) Christenh. & Byng
- Podophyllum guangxiense (Y.S.Wang) J.M.H.Shaw
- Podophyllum hemsleyi J.M.H.Shaw & Stearn
- Podophyllum hexandrum Royle
- Podophyllum majoense Gagnep.
- Podophyllum peltatum L.
- Podophyllum pleianthum Hance
- Podophyllum sinense (H.L.Li) Christenh. & Byng
- Podophyllum trilobulum J.M.H.Shaw
- Podophyllum tsayuense (T.S.Ying) Christenh. & Byng
- Podophyllum versipelle Hance
