= Podophyllum delavayi =

Scientific classification
- Kingdom: Plantae
- Clade: Tracheophytes
- Clade: Angiosperms
- Clade: Eudicots
- Order: Ranunculales
- Family: Berberidaceae
- Genus: Podophyllum
- Species: P. delavayi

Binomial name
- Podophyllum delavayi Franch.

Synonyms
- Dysosma delavayi (Franch.) Hu; Dysosma veitchii (Hemsl. & E.H.Wilson) L.K.Fu; Podophyllum veitchii Hemsl. & E.H.Wilson

Species of flowering plant

Podophyllum delavayi, the Chinese mayapple, is a herbaceous perennial plant in the family Berberidaceae native to South-Central China. It is highly sought after by plant collectors and avid shade gardeners. It is distinguished by its lobed, peltate foliage that is remarkably mottled when it first emerges in early spring. Deep red flowers appear in May (hence the name mayapple) and are somewhat foul-scented to attract its pollinators.

Chinese mayapples are found in moist woodland conditions often by a stream where water is constant, but drainage is optimal.

Podophyllum delavayi has also shown a tendency to produce stolons, which aids propagation of this rare plant. Traditionally, this species is propagated by division, seed, and it has also been successfully micropropagated through tissue culture.
