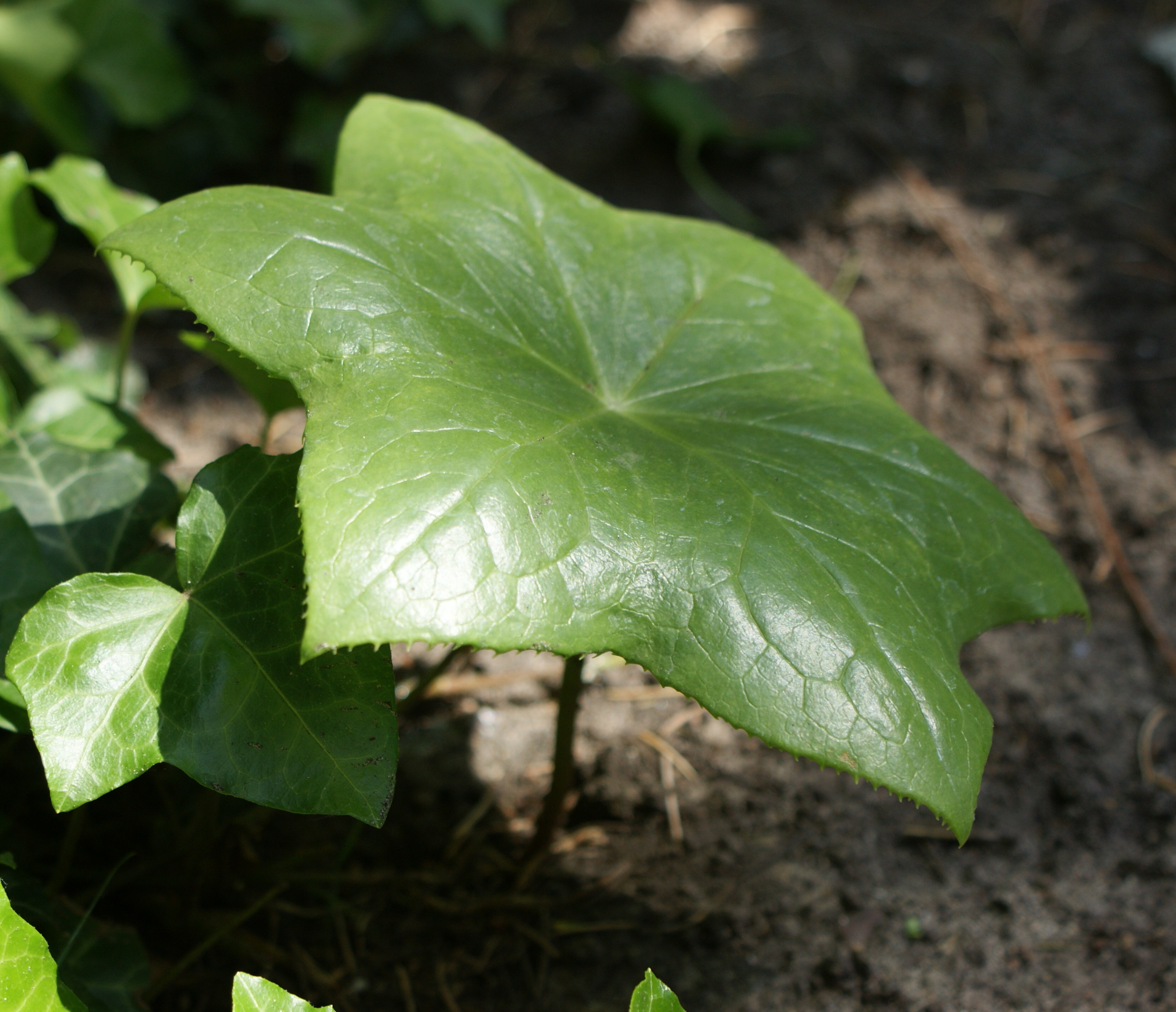
- Leaves can be up to 45 cm (18 in) wide

Scientific classification
- Kingdom: Plantae
- Clade: Embryophytes
- Clade: Tracheophytes
- Clade: Spermatophytes
- Clade: Angiosperms
- Clade: Eudicots
- Order: Ranunculales
- Family: Berberidaceae
- Genus: Podophyllum
- Species: P. pleianthum

Binomial name
- Podophyllum pleianthum Hance

Synonyms
- List: Dysosma chengii (S.S.Chien) M.Hiroe; Dysosma hispida (K.S.Hao) M.Hiroe; Dysosma pleiantha (Hance) Woodson; Podophyllum chengii S.S.Chien; Podophyllum hispidum K.S.Hao; Podophyllum onzoi Hayata

= Podophyllum pleianthum =

Species of flowering plant

Podophyllum pleianthum (syn. Dysosma pleiantha), the many-flowered Chinese mayapple, is a species of flowering plant in the genus Podophyllum, native to south-central and southeast China, including Taiwan. Shade tolerant, and deer resistant due to its toxicity, it has gained the Royal Horticultural Society's Award of Garden Merit.

== Pharmacology ==
Podophyllum pleianthum or Bajiaolian has been use in traditional Chinese medicine in China and Taiwan for the treatment of snake bite, weakness, condyloma accuminata, lymphadenopathy and tumors through ingestion of dried roots and rhizomes or application of resin.

Podophyllotoxin is a major active ingredient in Podophyllum pleianthum that is cytotoxic, arresting cellular metaphase and microtubule formation in cells. Symptoms of intoxication include nausea, vomiting, diarrhea, abdominal cramps, tachycardia, orthostatic hypotension, paralytic ileus, urinary retention, hepatorenal dysfunction, leukocytosis followed by leukopenia, thrombocytopenia, prolonged areflexia, prolonged paraethesia and sensory ataxia, dizziness, fever, memory impairment, hallucinations, paranoia, convulsion, fainting, and coma.
