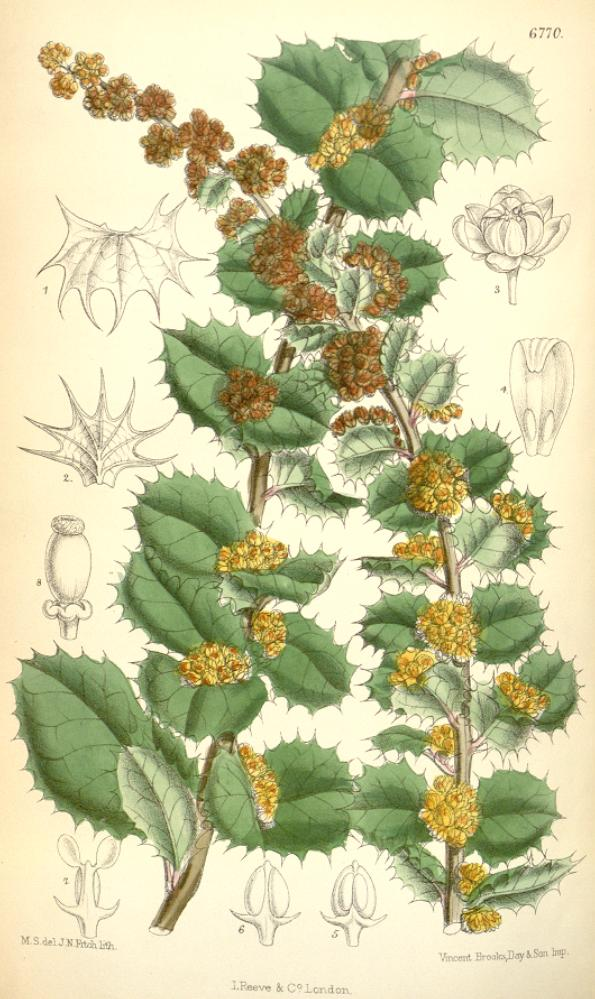

Scientific classification
- Kingdom: Plantae
- Clade: Tracheophytes
- Clade: Angiosperms
- Clade: Eudicots
- Order: Ranunculales
- Family: Berberidaceae
- Genus: Berberis
- Species: B. actinacantha

Binomial name
- Berberis actinacantha Mart. ex Schult.f.

Synonyms
- Berberis brachyacantha Phil. ex Reiche; Berberis coquimbensis Muñoz; Berberis crispa Gay; Berberis florida Phil.; Berberis hakeoides (Hook.f.) C.K.Schneid.; Berberis variiflora C.K.Schneid.; Berberis virgata K.Koch nom. illeg.

= Berberis actinacantha =

Species of flowering plant

Berberis actinacantha is a species of flowering plant also known as michay. It is endemic to north and central Chile.
