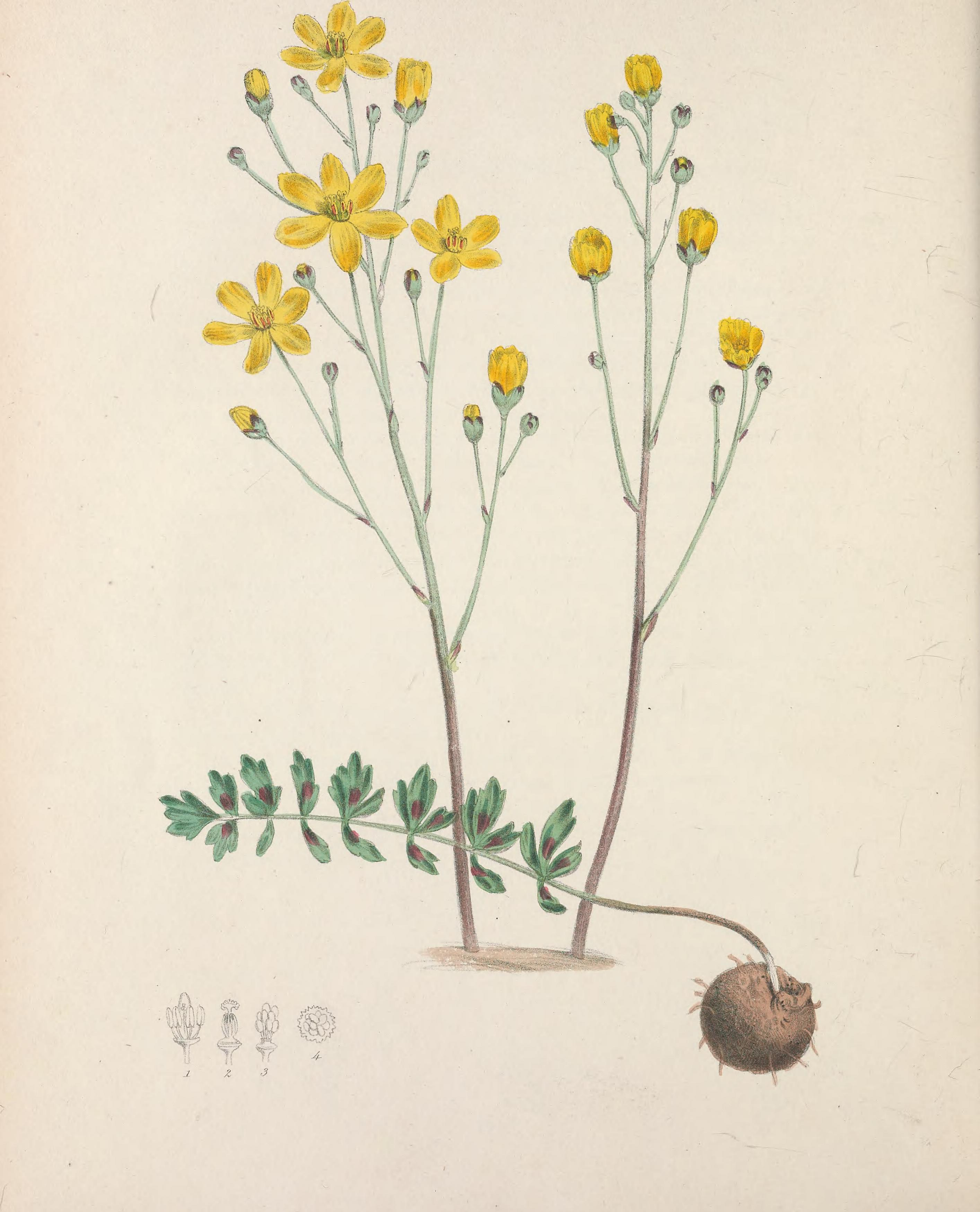

Scientific classification
- Kingdom: Plantae
- Clade: Tracheophytes
- Clade: Angiosperms
- Clade: Eudicots
- Order: Ranunculales
- Family: Berberidaceae
- Genus: Bongardia; C.A.Mey.
- Species: B. chrysogonum

Binomial name
- Bongardia chrysogonum Spach 1839 not Boiss.1867

Synonyms
- Bongardia margalla R.R.Stewart ex Qureshi & Chaudhri, name published without description; Bongardia olivieri C.A.Mey.; Bongardia rauwolfii C.A.Mey. (type species); Leontice chrysogonum L.

= Bongardia =

Genus of flowering plants belonging to the barberry family

Bongardia is a very small genus of plants belonging to the family Berberidaceae, and first described in 1831. There are only two known species, Bongardia chrysogonum C.A.Mey., native to North Africa, Greece, and the Middle East and B. margalla R.R.Stewart ex Qureshi & Chaudhri, native to Pakistan. The genus was monotypic until 1996, when the Pakistani populations were recognised by Govaerts as belonging to a second, distinct species.

The species are tuberous, herbaceous plants with a large rounded tuber and attractive pinnate leaves. The flowers are hermaphrodite (have both male and female organs). These rare plants are native to rocky mountain slopes and cultivated fields where summers are dry and winters are spent under snow. The genus was named in honour of Gustav Heinrich von Bongard (1786–1839), a German botanist, professor at St. Petersburg Imperial University. Leaves and roots are edible.

== Cultivation ==
The plants grow well in sandy, well-drained soil in full sun. A porous soil and year-round protection from excessive moisture with a period of hot summer drought are required for them to thrive. They are propagated from seed.
