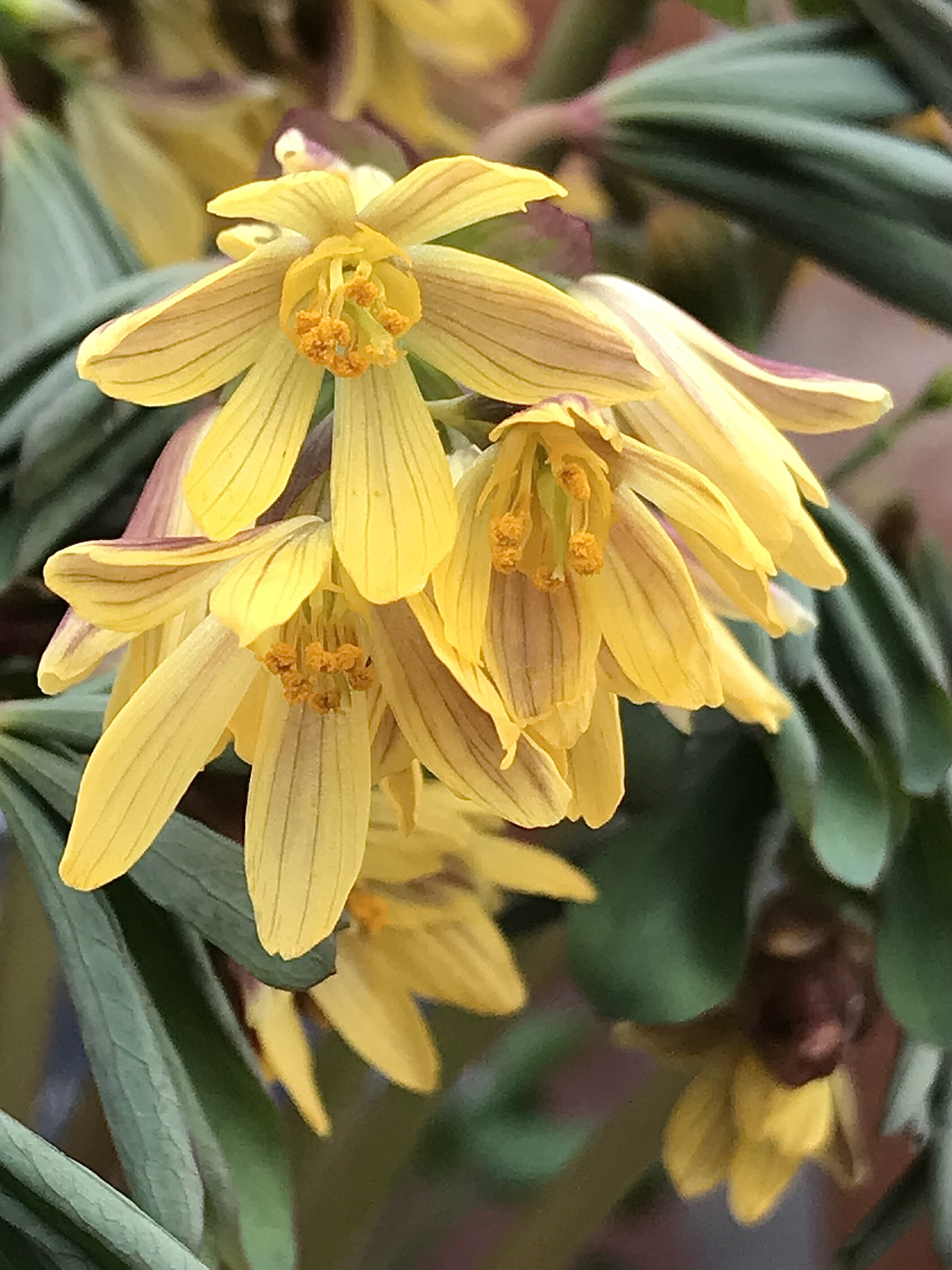
- Gymnospermium albertii

Scientific classification
- Kingdom: Plantae
- Clade: Tracheophytes
- Clade: Angiosperms
- Clade: Eudicots
- Order: Ranunculales
- Family: Berberidaceae
- Genus: Gymnospermium; Spach

Type species
- Gymnospermium altaicum Spach

= Gymnospermium =

Genus of flowering plants belonging to the barberry family

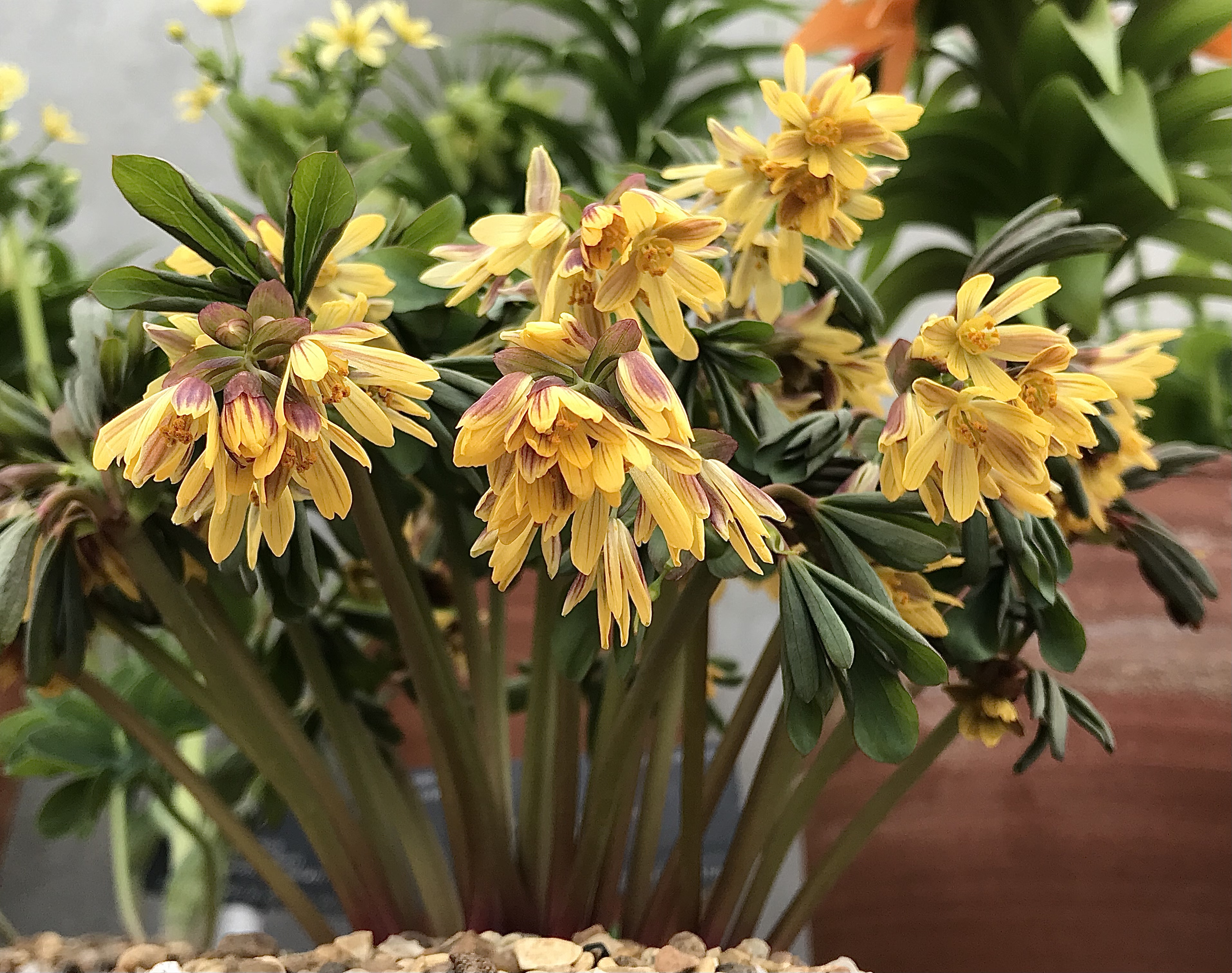
Gymnospermium albertii: container plant in the Alpine House at Kew Gardens

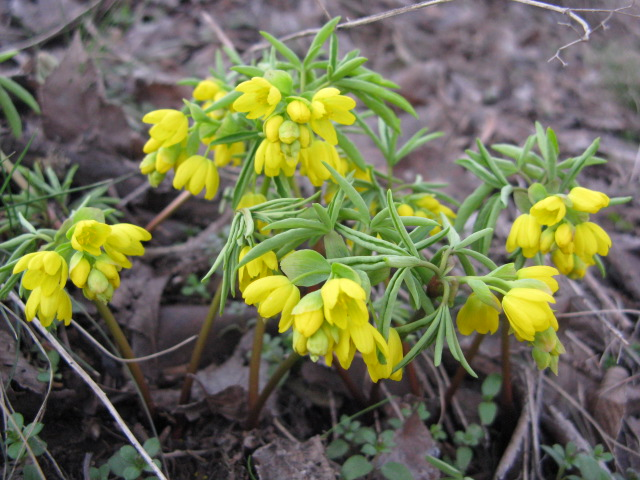
G. odessanum growing in a Ukrainian nature reserve

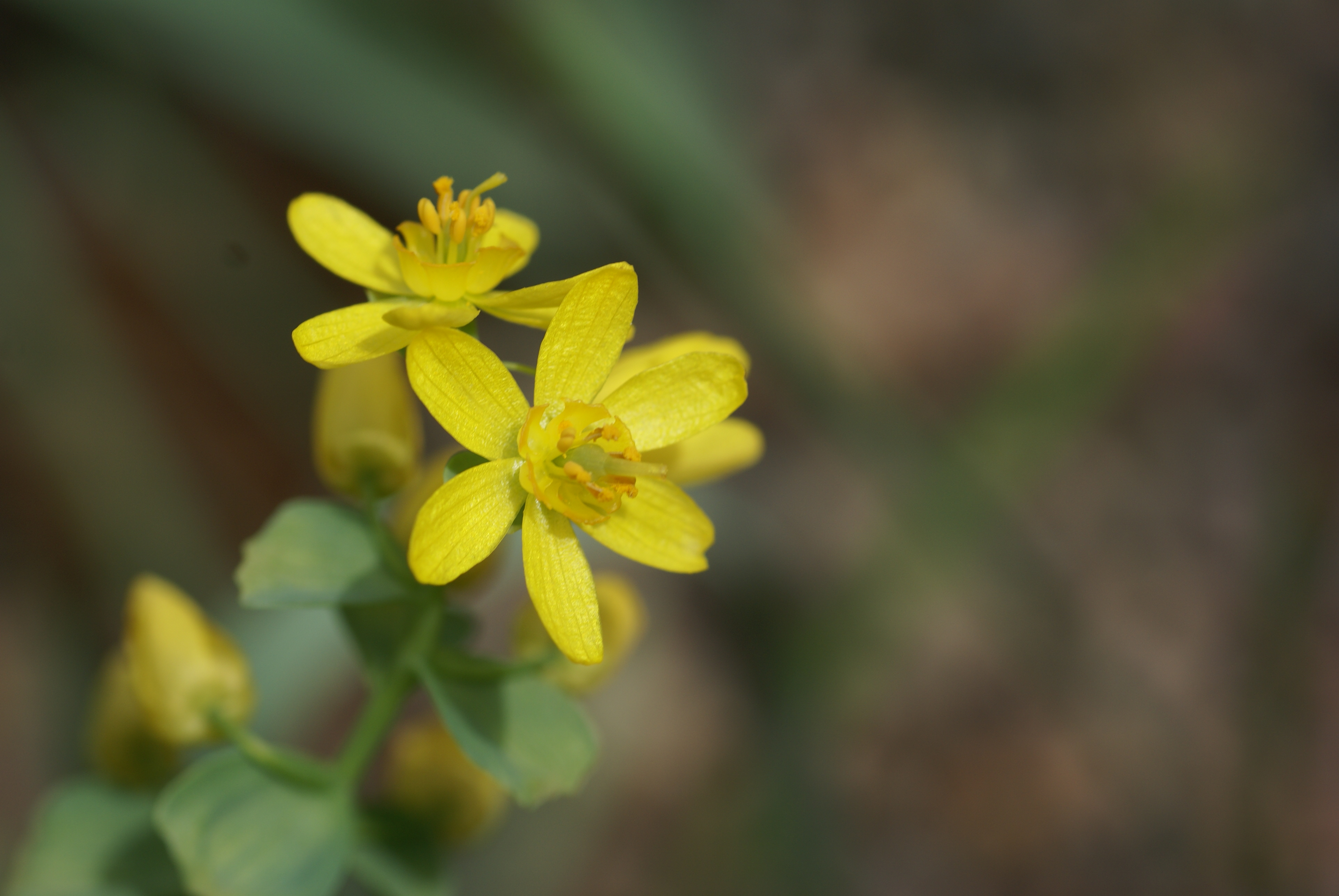
G. altaicum growing in a Swedish botanic garden

Gymnospermium is a group of tuberous flowering plants in the family Berberidaceae described as a genus in 1839. It is native to temperate Europe and Asia.

== Species ==
The genus contains the following species:

1. Gymnospermium albertii - Uzbekistan
2. Gymnospermium altaicum - Altai, Xinjiang
3. Gymnospermium darwasicum - Tajikistan, Uzbekistan
4. Gymnospermium kiangnanense - Anhui, Zhejiang
5. Gymnospermium maloi - southern Albania
6. Gymnospermium microrrhynchum - Jilin, Liaoning, Korea
7. Gymnospermium odessanum - Greece, Ukraine, Crimea
8. Gymnospermium peloponnesiacum - Greece
9. Gymnospermium scipetarum - Greece, North Macedonia, Albania
10. Gymnospermium silvaticum - Afghanistan, Tajikistan
11. Gymnospermium smirnovii - Kakheti, Ukraine
12. Gymnospermium sylvaticum - Iran, Afghanistan, Tajikistan
13. Gymnospermium vitellinum - Central Asia
