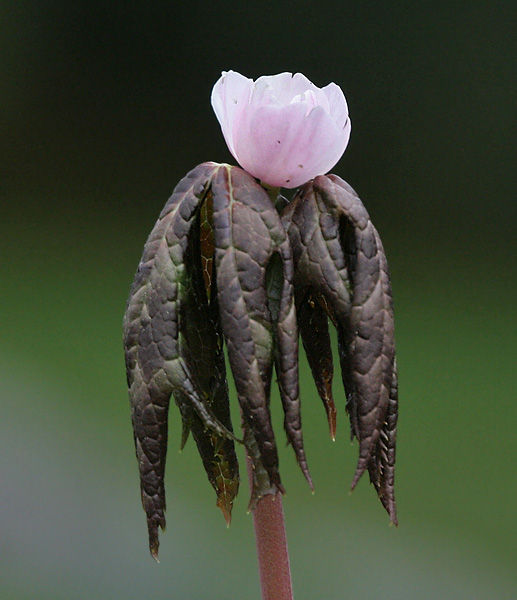
- Flower and leaves

Scientific classification
- Kingdom: Plantae
- Clade: Tracheophytes
- Clade: Angiosperms
- Clade: Eudicots
- Order: Ranunculales
- Family: Berberidaceae
- Genus: Sinopodophyllum; T.S.Ying
- Species: S. hexandrum

Binomial name
- Sinopodophyllum hexandrum (Royle) T.S.Ying

Synonyms
- Dysosma emodi (Wall. ex Royle) M.Hiroe; Podophyllum emodi Wall. ex Hook.f. & Thomson; Podophyllum emodi var. chinense Sprague; Podophyllum hexandrum Royle; Sinopodophyllum emodi (Wall. ex Hook.f. & Thomson) T.S.Ying

= Sinopodophyllum =

Himalayan mayapple

Genus of flowering plants belonging to the barberry family

Sinopodophyllum is a herbaceous perennial plant in the family Berberidaceae, described as a genus in 1979. It includes only one known species, Sinopodophyllum hexandrum, native to Afghanistan, Bhutan, northern India, Kashmir, Nepal, Pakistan, and western China (Gansu, Qinghai, Shaanxi, Sichuan, Tibet, Yunnan). Common names include Himalayan may apple and Indian may apple.

== Description ==
Sinopodophyllum hexandrum is low to the ground with glossy green, drooping, lobed leaves on its few stiff branches, bearing a pale pink flower and bright red-orange bulbous fruit. The ornamental appearance of the plant make it a desirable addition to woodland-type gardens. It can be propagated by seed or by dividing the rhizome. It is very tolerant of cold temperatures, as would be expected of a Himalayan plant, but it does not tolerate dry conditions. Its name in Hindi and Ayurveda is bantrapushi or Giriparpat and is locally referred to as 'ban kakdi' in the Valley of Flowers National Park.

== Medicinal uses ==
The root and rhizome of the plant are poisonous, but used traditionally for medicine. They are composed of aryltetralin lignans that have anticancer, antifungal, and immunomodulatory properties. The rhizome of the plant also contains a resin, known generally and commercially as Indian Podophyllum Resin, which can be processed to extract podophyllin (podophyllotoxin), a neurotoxin. Rhizomes contain up to 15% podophyllin. In carefully administered doses, the resin can be applied topically to treat genital warts.

== Distribution and habitat ==
Sinopodophyllum hexandrum grows across the Himalayan region, east to Afghanistan, and north to Southwest China. It is reasonably abundant in the Great Himalayan National Park of Himachal Pradesh. In the fringes of the Valley of Flowers National Park, the plant's density is about one individual per square meter according to a study by C.P. Kala.

== Conservation ==
Harvesting from the wild is becoming unsustainable. Over-exploitation of S. hexandrum and deforestation have resulted in its current IUCN endangered listing. It is also listed under Appendix II of the Convention on International Trade in Endangered Species of Wild Flora and Fauna (CITES) in which collecting and exporting all plant parts of S. hexandrum except for seed and pollen is illegal.

A study published by Kharkwal et al. (2008) found that propagating S. hexandrum seeds in an off-site controlled environment allowed seedlings to grow one year faster than in the field. Effective ex situ methods such as this can conserve genetic diversity while providing a substantial volume of transplants to go back out into the wild to combat over-harvesting vulnerability.

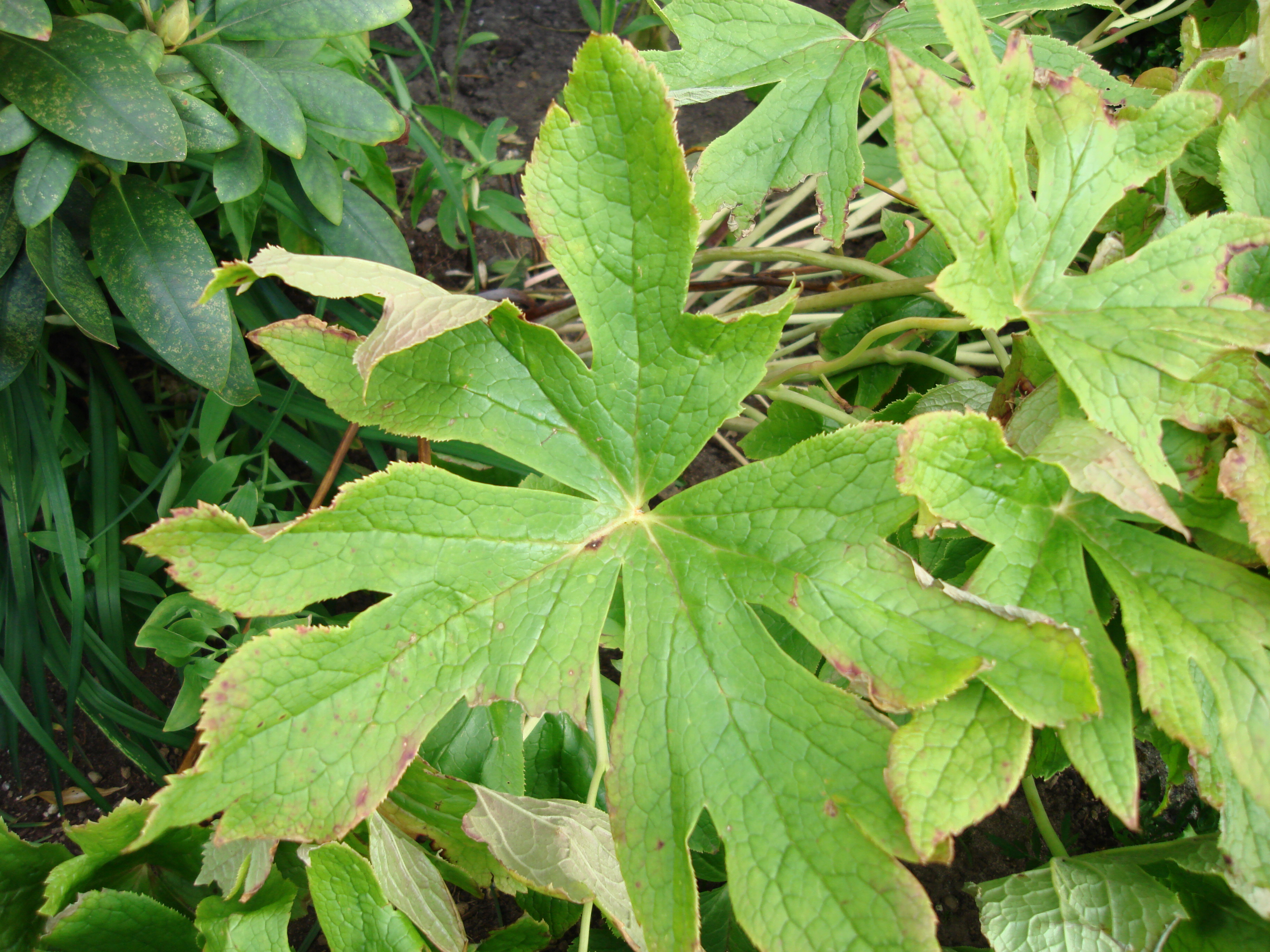
Close-up of single leaf

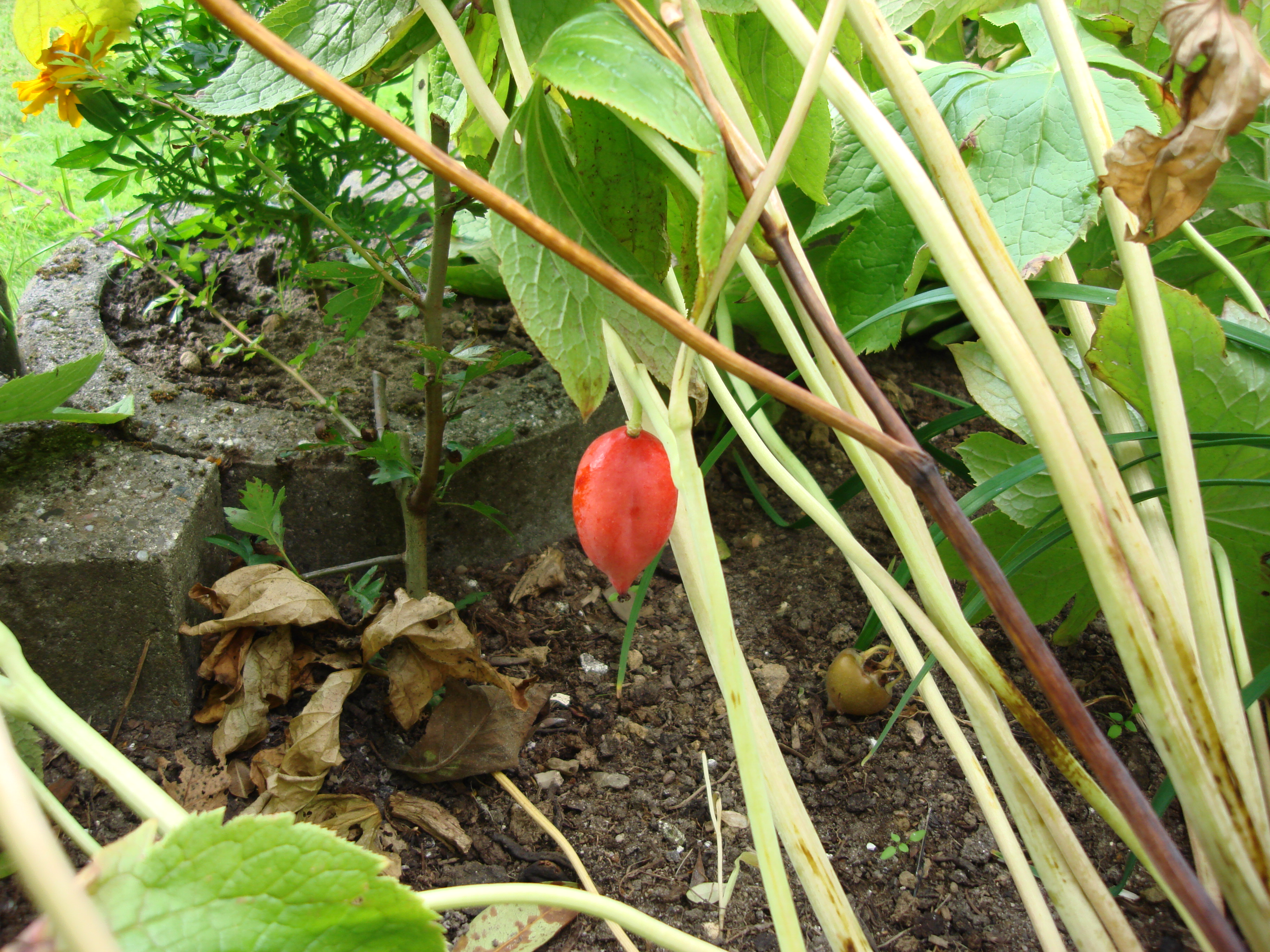
The approximately 5 cm long ripe fruit

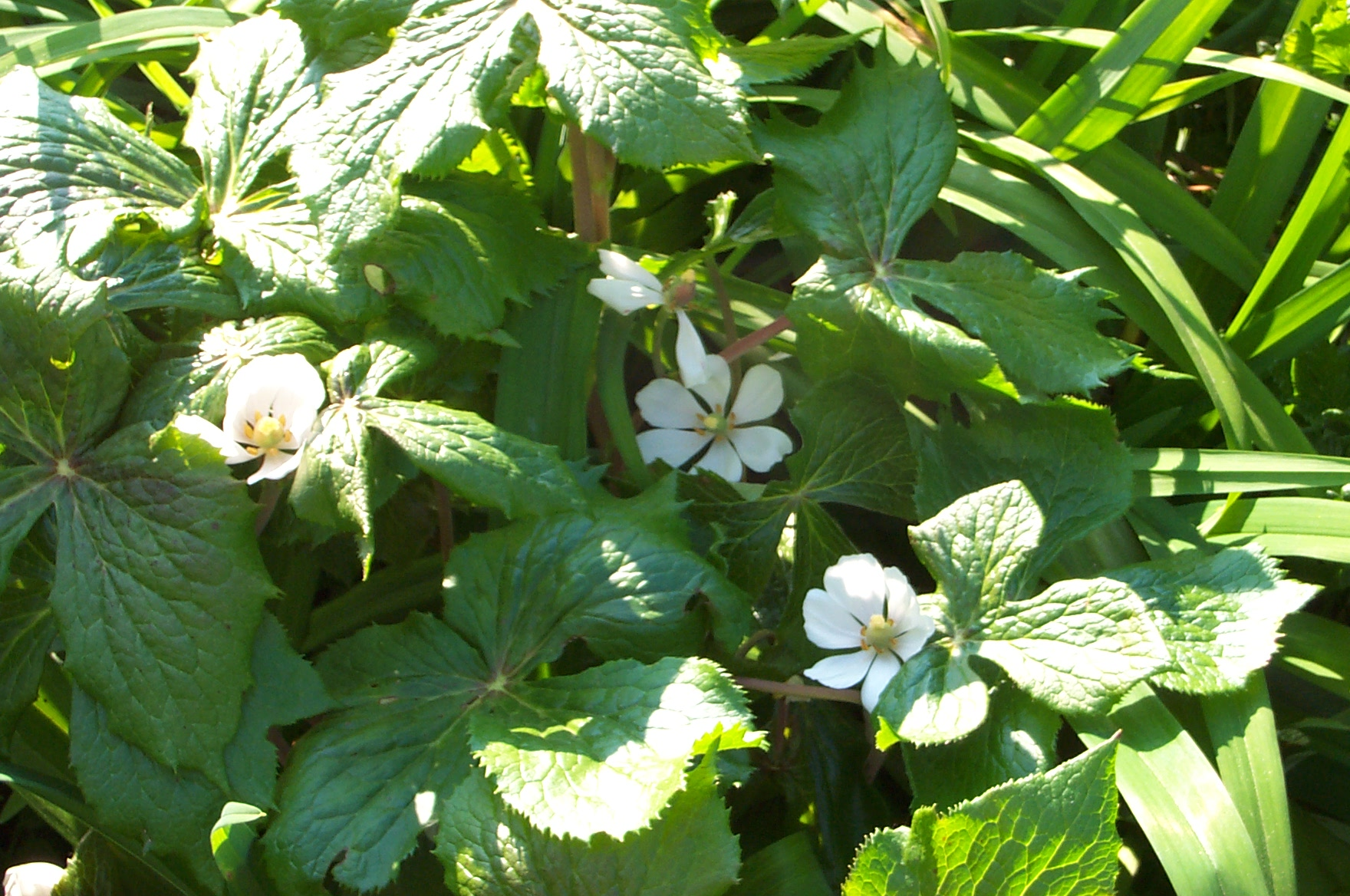
Flowers

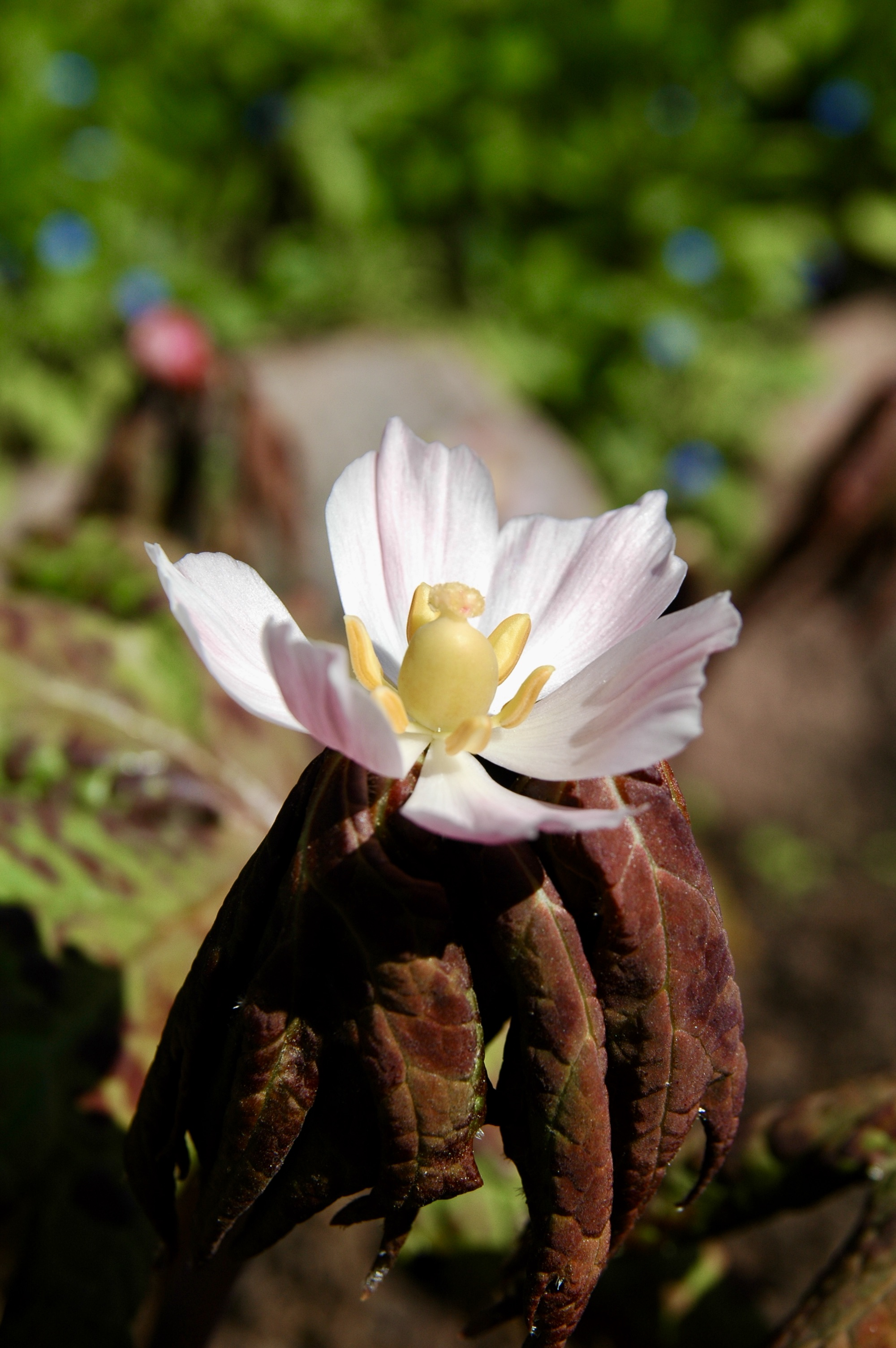
Portrait of a flower with leaves underneath

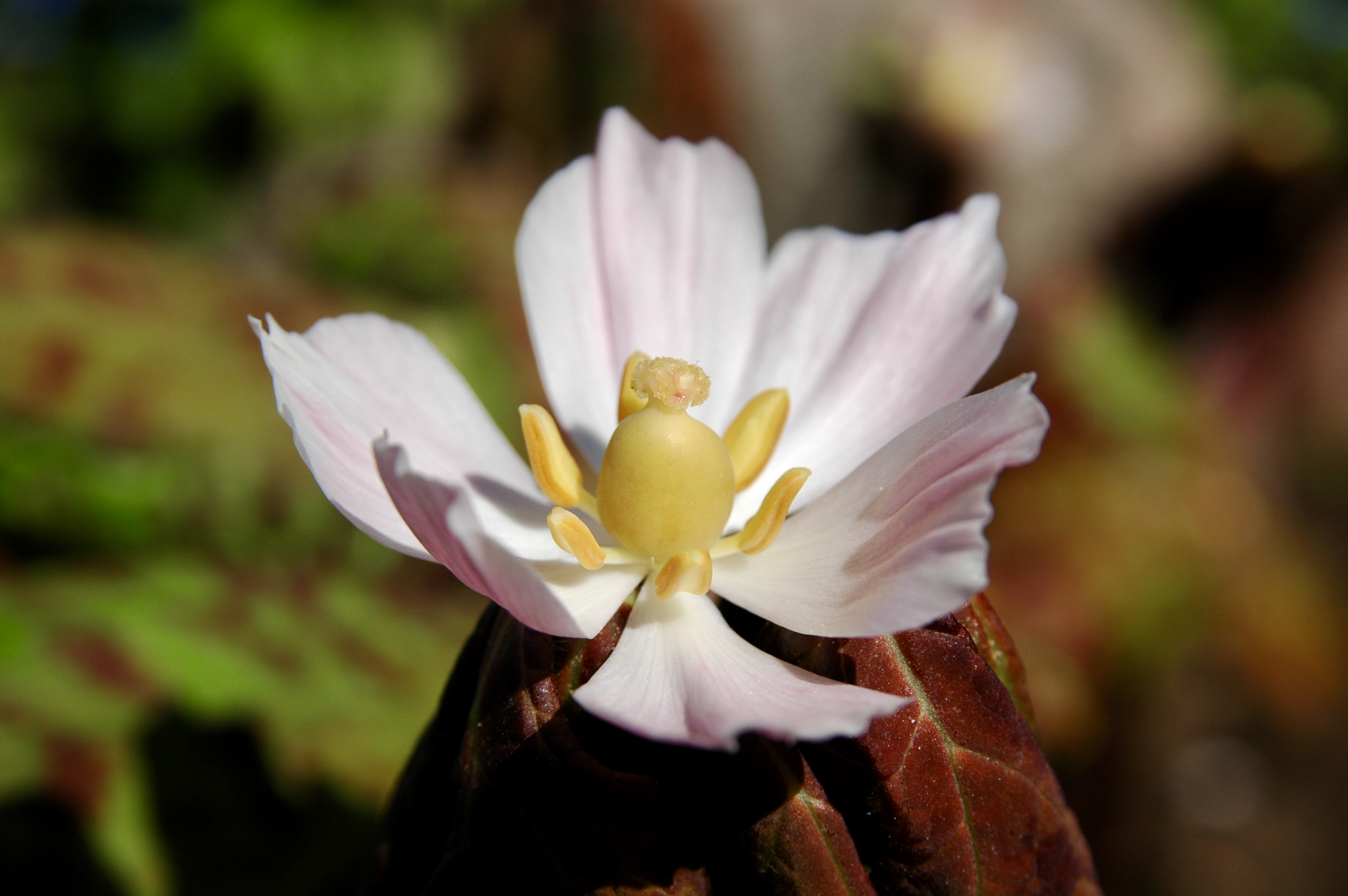
Close-up on a flower and its reproductive parts

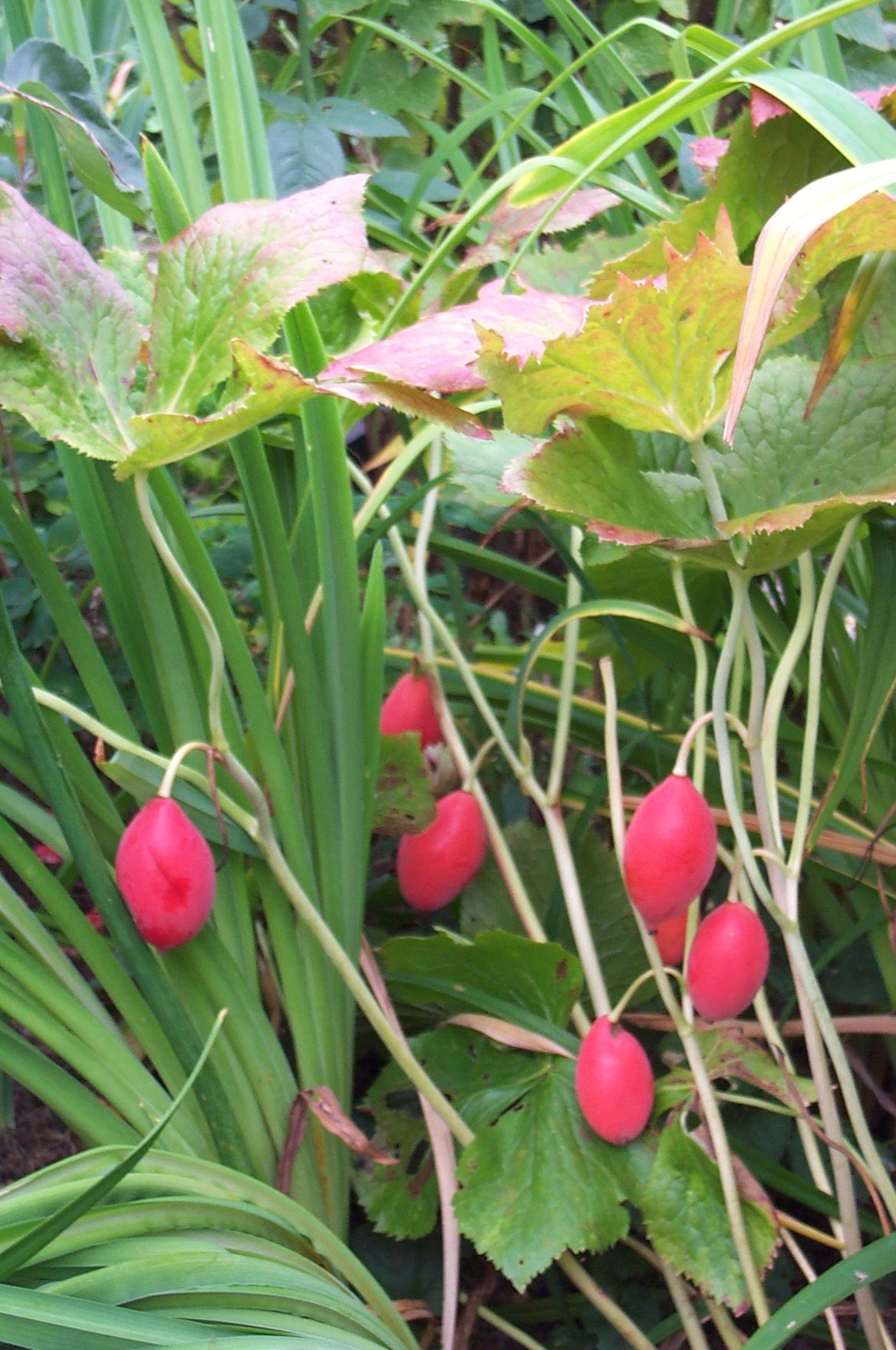
Some fruits of a >20-year-old plant
