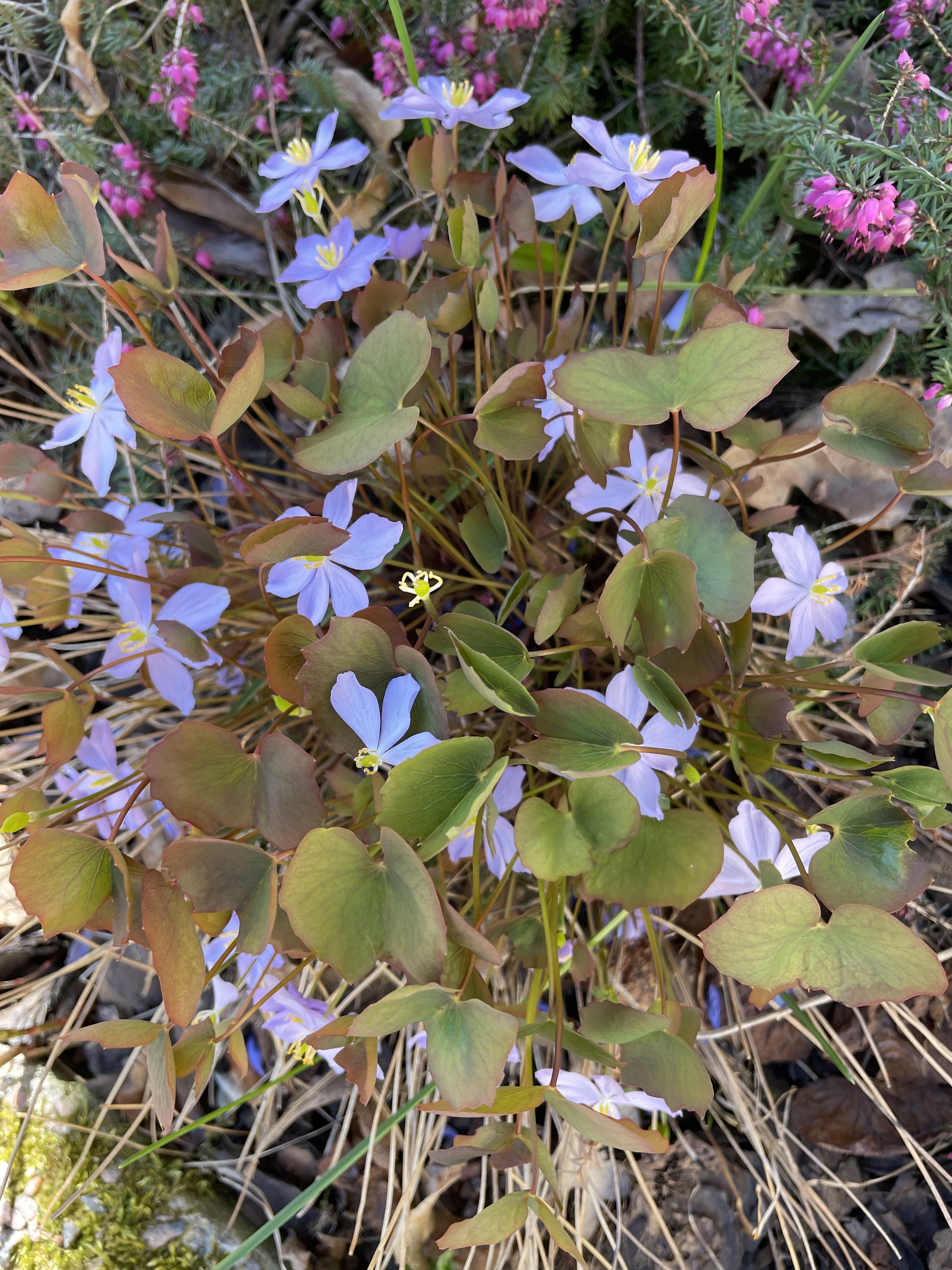
- Plagiorhegma dubium

Scientific classification
- Kingdom: Plantae
- Clade: Tracheophytes
- Clade: Angiosperms
- Clade: Eudicots
- Order: Ranunculales
- Family: Berberidaceae
- Genus: Plagiorhegma; Maxim.
- Species: P. dubium

Binomial name
- Plagiorhegma dubium Maxim.

= Plagiorhegma =

Genus of plants

Plagiorhegma is a monotypic genus of flowering plants belonging to the family Berberidaceae. The only species is Plagiorhegma dubium, the Asian twinleaf.

Its native range is Russian Far East to Korea.
