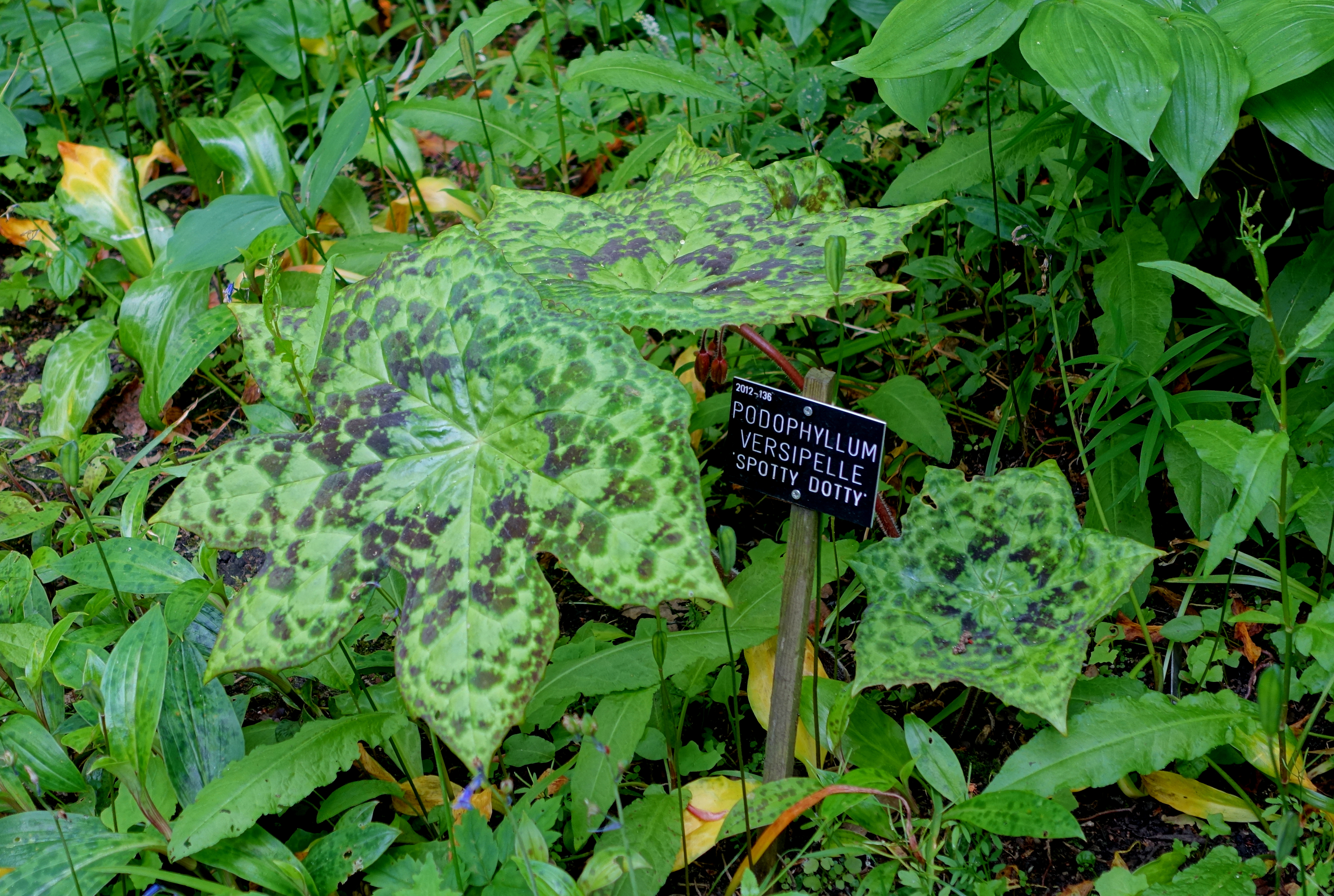
- Cv. 'Spotty Dotty' at Savill Garden, Windsor, England

Conservation status
- Vulnerable (IUCN 3.1)

Scientific classification
- Kingdom: Plantae
- Clade: Embryophytes
- Clade: Tracheophytes
- Clade: Spermatophytes
- Clade: Angiosperms
- Clade: Eudicots
- Order: Ranunculales
- Family: Berberidaceae
- Genus: Dysosma
- Species: D. versipellis

Binomial name
- Dysosma versipellis (Hance) M.Cheng

Synonyms
- Podophyllum esquirolii H. Lév.; Podophyllum versipelle Hance

= Dysosma versipellis =

Species of flowering plant

Dysosma versipellis is a species of flowering plant in the barberry family Berberidaceae, native to China. It is still widely referenced under Podophyllum versipelle and there is some debate as to its correct taxonomic status. Though it has quite a broad but sparse distribution in the damp, shady forests of south and west China, it has been designated as "Vulnerable" by the IUCN. A compact herbaceous perennial growing to 50 cm (20 in) tall and broad, it grows from underground rhizomes, with umbrella-shaped leaves and dark red, tubular, pendent flowers in spring.

It is quite hardy in temperate zones, surviving temperatures down to −10 °C (14 °F). However, it requires a sheltered spot in dappled shade, with acid to neutral soil. Under the synonym Podophyllum versipelle the cultivar 'Spotty Dotty', distinguished by bold brown leaf markings, has gained the Royal Horticultural Society's Award of Garden Merit.
