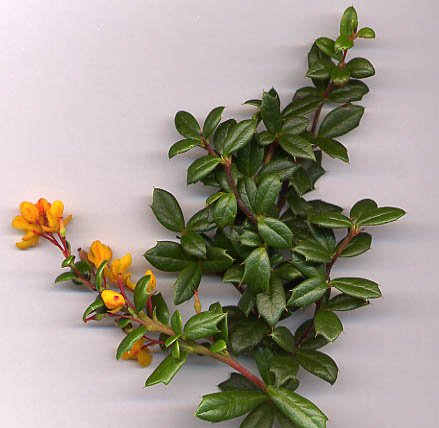
- Berberis darwinii shoot with flowers

Scientific classification
- Kingdom: Plantae
- Clade: Tracheophytes
- Clade: Angiosperms
- Clade: Eudicots
- Order: Ranunculales
- Family: Berberidaceae; Juss.

Genera
- See text

= Berberidaceae =

Family of flowering plants

The Berberidaceae are a family of 18 genera of flowering plants commonly called the barberry family. This family is in the order Ranunculales. The family contains about 700 known species, of which the majority are in the genus Berberis. The species include trees, shrubs and perennial herbaceous plants.

== Taxonomy ==
The APG IV system of 2016 recognises the family and places it in the order Ranunculales in the clade eudicots.

In some older treatments of the family, Berberidaceae only included four genera (Berberis, Epimedium, Mahonia, Vancouveria), with the other genera treated in separate families, Leonticaceae (Bongardia, Caulophyllum, Gymnospermium, Leontice), Nandinaceae (Nandina), and Podophyllaceae (Achlys, Diphylleia, Dysosma, Jeffersonia, Podophyllum, Ranzania, Sinopodophyllum).

Mahonia is very closely related to Berberis, and included in it by many botanists. However, recent DNA-based phylogenetic research has reinstated Mahonia, though with a handful of species transferred into the newly described genera Alloberberis (formerly Mahonia section Horridae) and Moranothamnus (formerly Mahonia claireae). Species of Mahonia and Berberis can be hybridised, with the hybrids being classified in the genus × Mahoberberis.

Diphyllaea is closely related to or perhaps embedded within Podophyllum. Instead of the current trend to subdivide Podophyllum into three genera (Podophyllum, plus Dysosma and Sinopodophyllum), inclusion of Diphyllaea in a larger Podophyllum is equally warranted.

Genera are displayed in the following cladogram

- - - - Alloberberis C. C. Yu & K. F. Chung
      - Berberis L. including Mahonia Nutt. — barberry
      - Moranothamnus
    - Ranzania T. Itô (Japan)
  - - Nandina Thunb. — heavenly bamboo (eastern Asia from the Himalaya to Japan)
    - - Caulophyllum Michx. — blue cohosh
      - Gymnospermium Spach
- - - - Bongardia C. A. Mey.
      - - Achlys DC. — vanilla-leaf
        - - Diphylleia Michx. (southern Appalachian Mountains, northern Japan, and China)
          - - Dysosma (China)
            - Podophyllum L. — mayapple (North America and Asia)
            - Sinopodophyllum (Afghanistan, Bhutan, northern India, Kashmir, Nepal, Pakistan, Tibet, and western China)
    - - Epimedium L.
      - Vancouveria Morren & Decne. — inside-out flower (western U.S.)
  - - Jeffersonia W. Bartram — twinleaf
    - Plagiorhegma Maxim.
- Leontice L. (Middle East to Central and Western Asia)

== Gallery ==
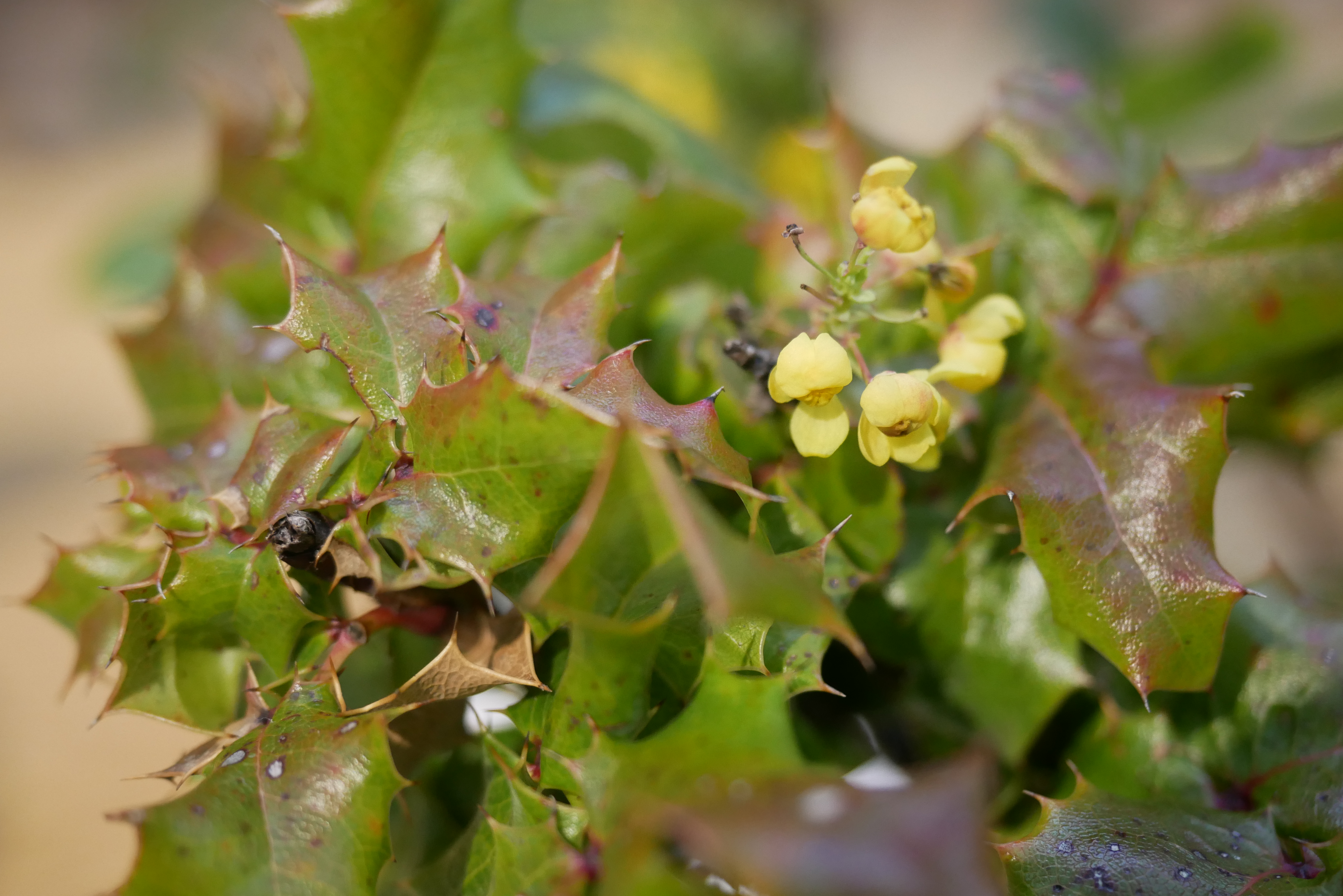
Berberis pinnata (California barberry)

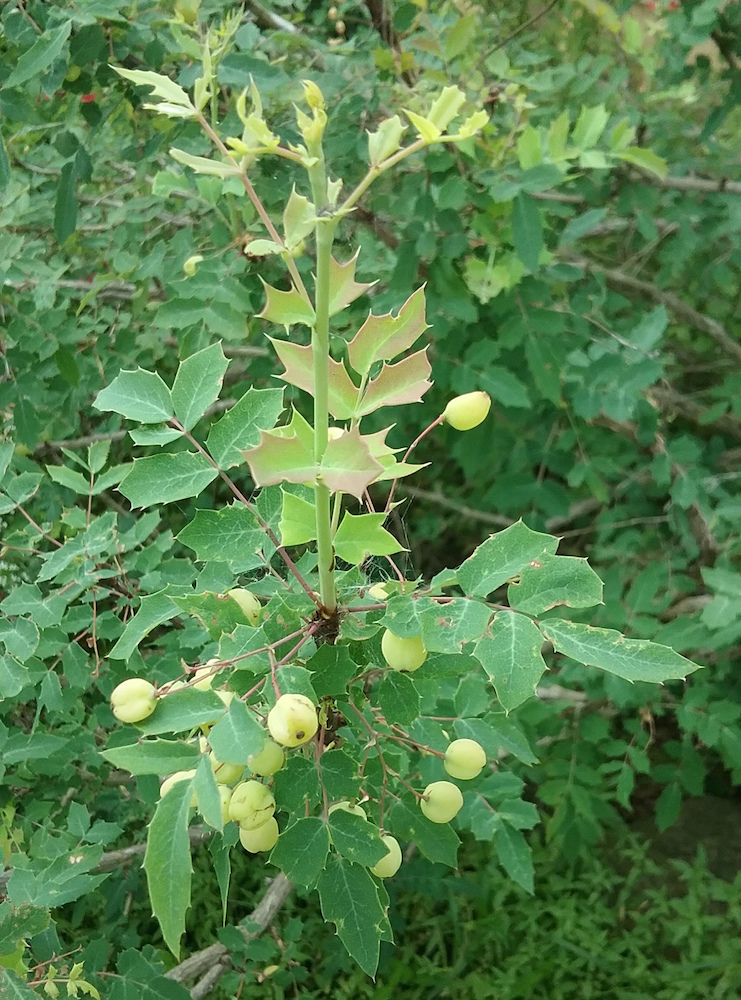
Berberis swaseyi

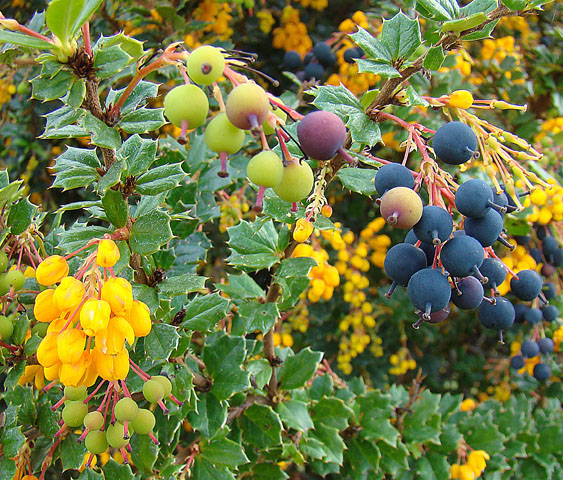
Berberis darwinii (calafate or michay)

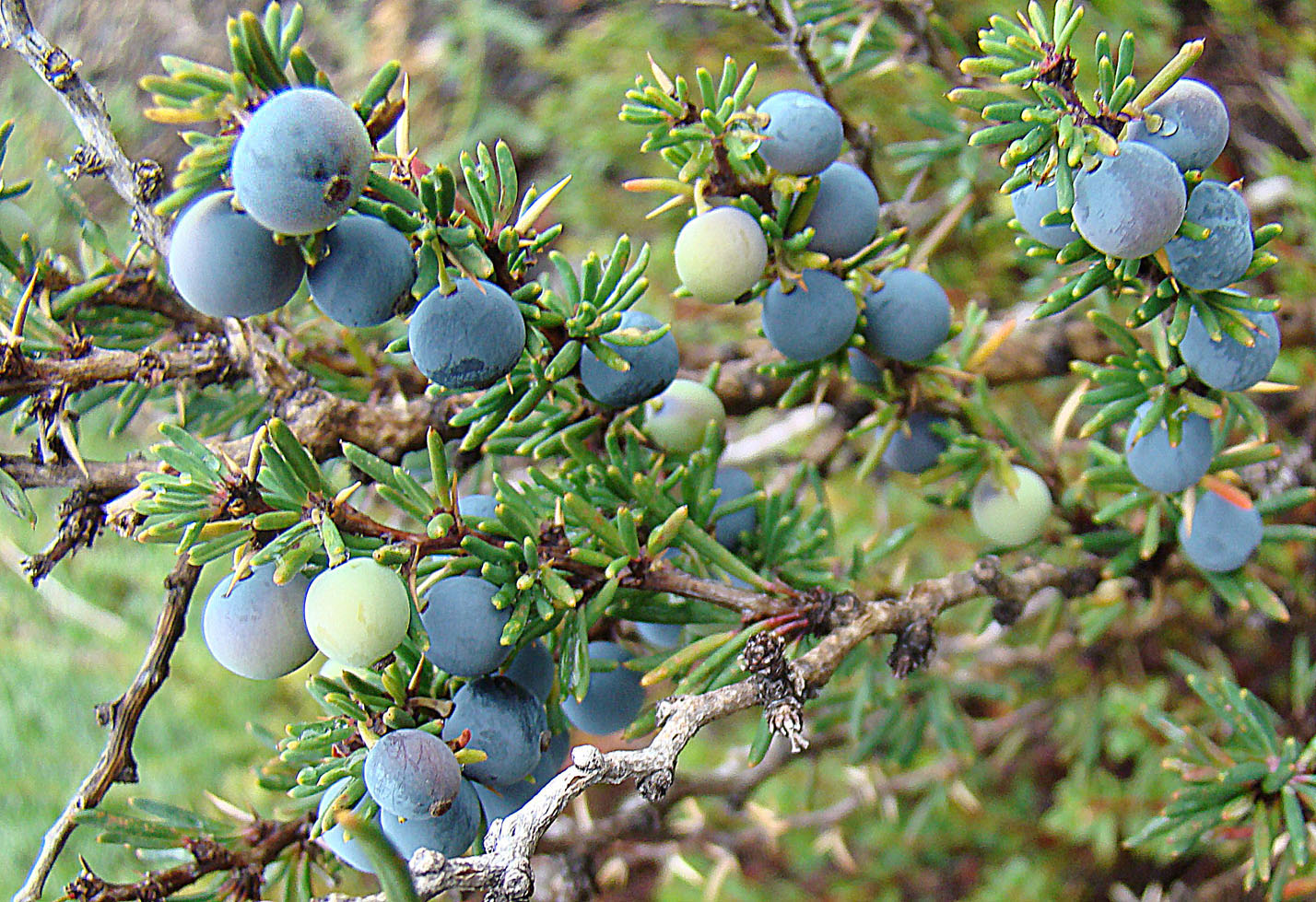
Berberis empetrifolia, fruit
