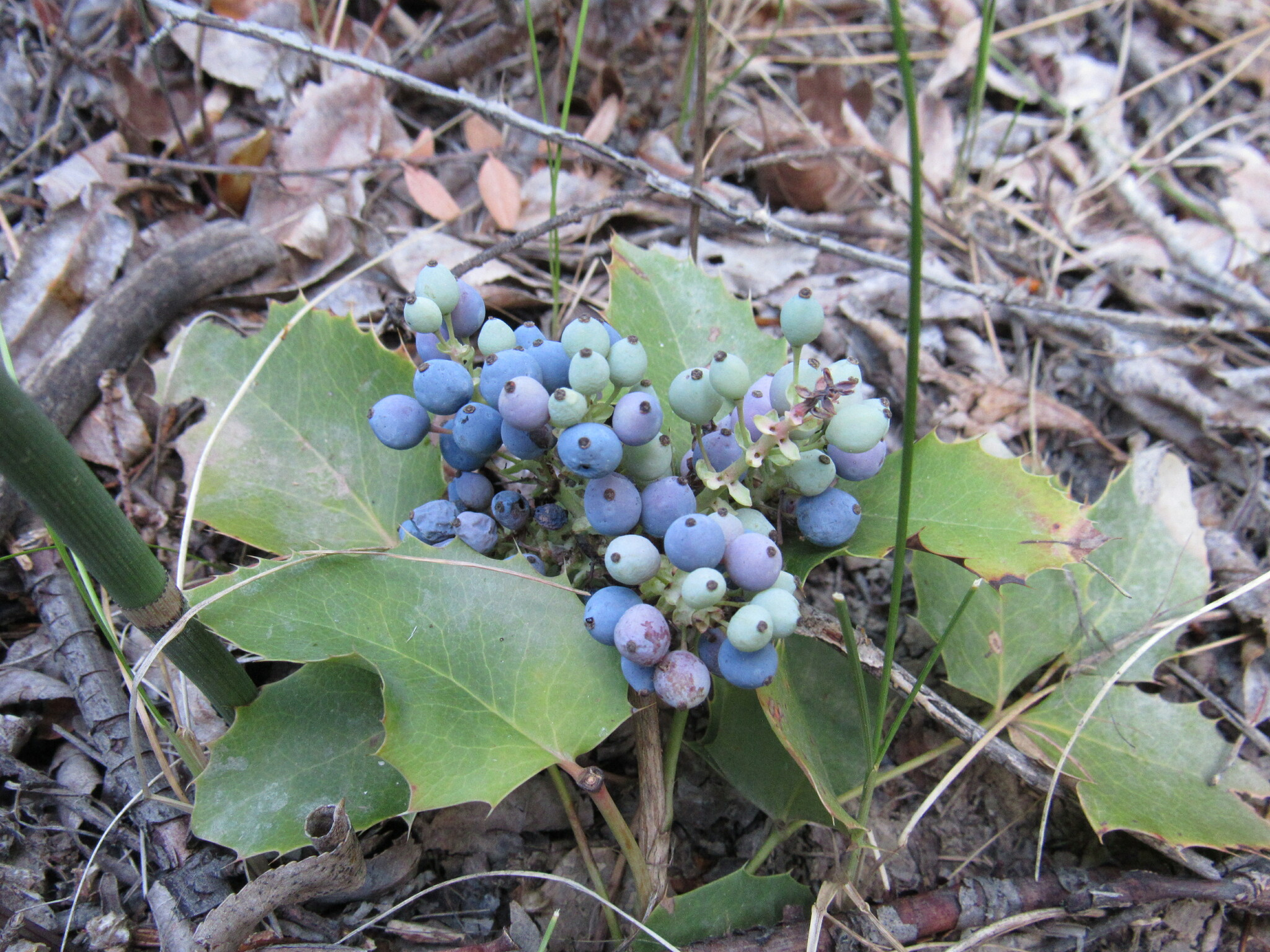
- Berberis repens with ripening fruit Grand Mesa, Colorado

Conservation status
- Secure (NatureServe)

Scientific classification
- Kingdom: Plantae
- Clade: Tracheophytes
- Clade: Angiosperms
- Clade: Eudicots
- Order: Ranunculales
- Family: Berberidaceae
- Genus: Berberis
- Species: B. repens

Binomial name
- Berberis repens Lindl.

Synonyms
- Berberis aquifolium subsp. repens (Lindl.) Brayshaw; Berberis aquifolium var. repens (Lindl.) Scoggan; Mahonia repens (Lindl.) G.Don; Mahonia repens var. typica C.K.Schneid.; Odostemon repens (Lindl.) Cockerell

= Berberis repens =

Creeping Oregon grape

Plant species in the buttercup family

Berberis repens commonly known as creeping mahonia, creeping grape holly, or creeping barberry, is a species of Berberis native to most of the western United States and two western provinces of Canada. It is low growing shrub that spreads by underground stems. As a species it is well adapted to fire and is a very common understory plant in western forests. An evergreen species, it provides food to deer and elk in winter and can make up a significant part of their diet. The berries are eaten by birds and small mammals, aiding it in spreading to recently disturbed areas. It has found use as a xeric ornamental plant and has escaped from cultivation in areas beyond its native range.

== Description ==
Berberis repens is an extremely short shrub, usually just 2–20 centimeters (0.79–7.9 in) tall, very occasionally reaching 60 centimeters (24 in). The bark on stems becomes gray-purple or gray in color and are not hairy. The plants spread by modified underground stems (rhizomes) that are about 1.5–5.0 centimeters (0.59–2.0 in) under the surface of the mineral soil. Despite the short above ground height its roots can reach as much as three meters into the ground.

The leaves are compound with an odd number of leaflets attached to the main vein. Usually leaves have five or seven leaflets, but may have just three. The length of a complete leaf structure will be 10–30 centimeters (3.9–12 in). The upper surfaces of the leaflets are smooth and dark green while the undersides are lighter green and covered in fine, downy hairs. The edges of the leaflets have between six and twenty-four teeth tipped with spines. Although it is evergreen, in the fall and winter leaves will partially or completely turn bronze or red in color when exposed to sun.

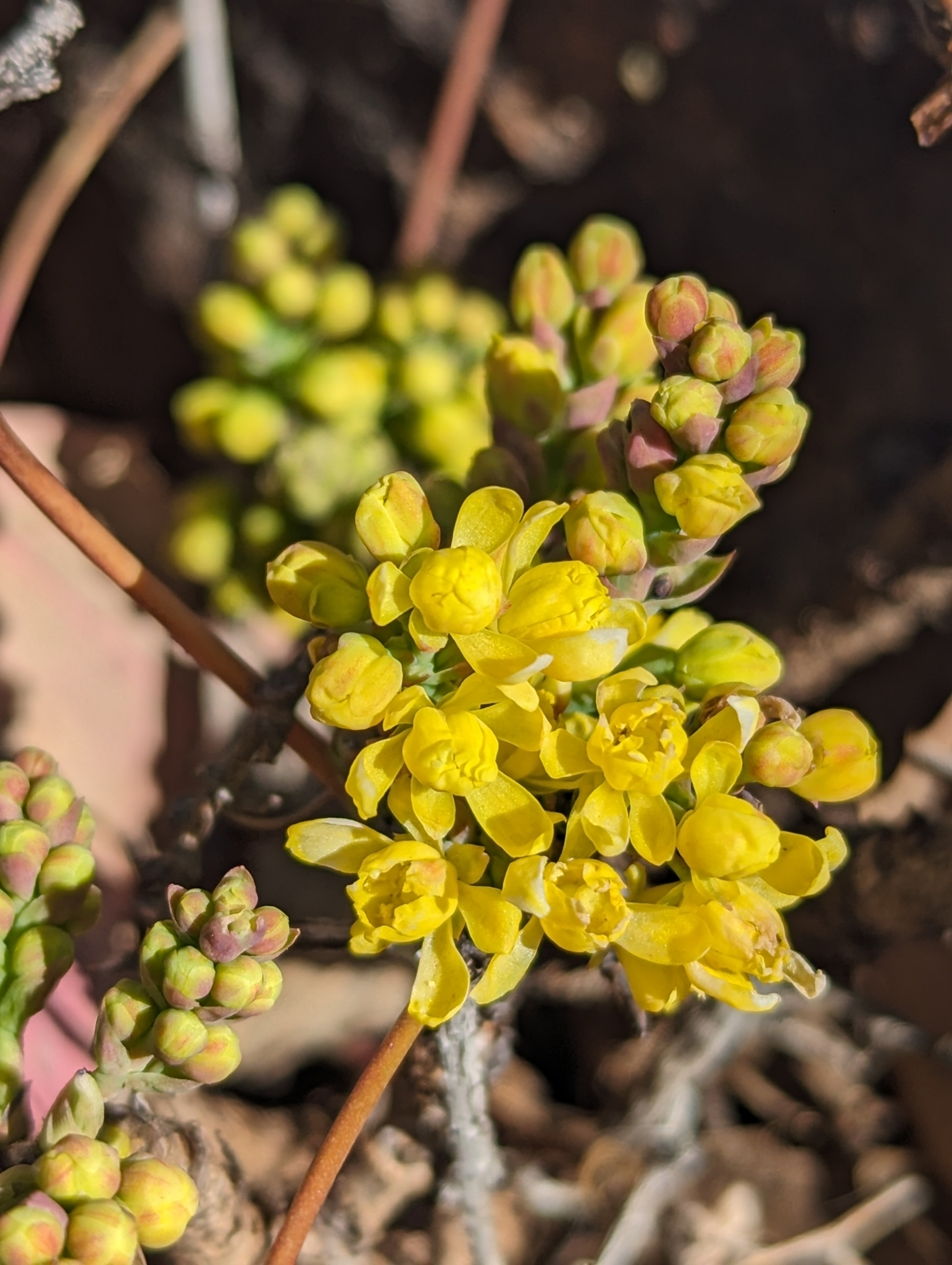
Raceme of early spring flowers near Morrison, Colorado

The flowers grow in a densely packed inflorescence without branches called a raceme. Each one will have between ten and fifty flowers and be 4–10 centimeters (1.6–3.9 in) long. The yellow flowers bloom early in the spring and are quite fragrant. Local condition determine the exact timing of the bloom which may be as early as February or as late as June. The flowers have six yellow sepals outside the six yellow petals with the tip of each split. Each flower has a single pistil, but six pollen producing stamens which emerge when the petals or sepals are touched.

Berberis repens has quite striking dark purple-black berries with a matte blue blush that contain a single seed and resemble a grape. Each berry is roughly round, about 6–10 millimeters in size, and juicy in texture. The flavor of the berries is quite tart with an astringent quality, and generally more attractive to birds than humans.

== Taxonomy ==
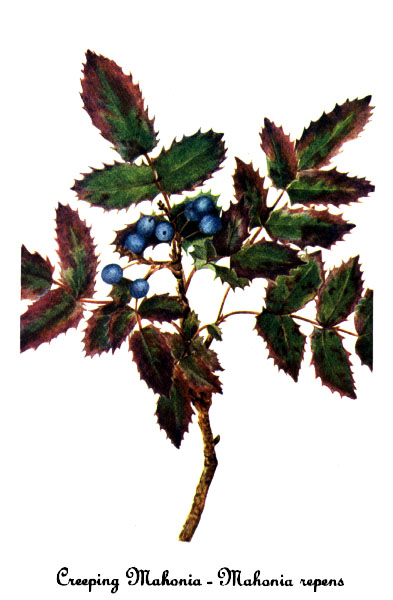
Botanical illustration by Mary Vaux Walcott

Berberis repens was scientifically described by John Lindley in 1828. Two years later George Don published a description of it classifying it as Mahonia repens. The correct classification of this and the other species into a separate Mahonia genus or with the rest of the barberries in Berberis has been controversial since that time. In 1997 a widely cited paper by Joseph Edward Laferrière summarized the arguments in favor of Berberis as the correct classification. Though genetic work since that time has argued for the revival of at least part of the genus.

Some botanical sources, such as the USDA Natural Resources Conservation Service PLANTS database (PLANTS), continue to list the species as Mahonia repens. However, as of 2024 Plants of the World Online, World Flora Online, and NatureServe agree that it is properly placed in Berberis. Additionally, some botanists treat the plant as a subspecies of Oregon-grape holly (Berberis aquifolium), in which case the scientific name Berberis aquifolium var. repens is applied.

=== Names ===
The species name, repens, is Latin for "creeping". Berberis repens is commonly known as "creeping grape holly", "creeping grapeholly", "creeping mahonia", "creeping barberry", and "creeping Oregon grape".

The Ute dialect name for this species is "ksǐq-o-a-ats".

== Distribution and habitat ==
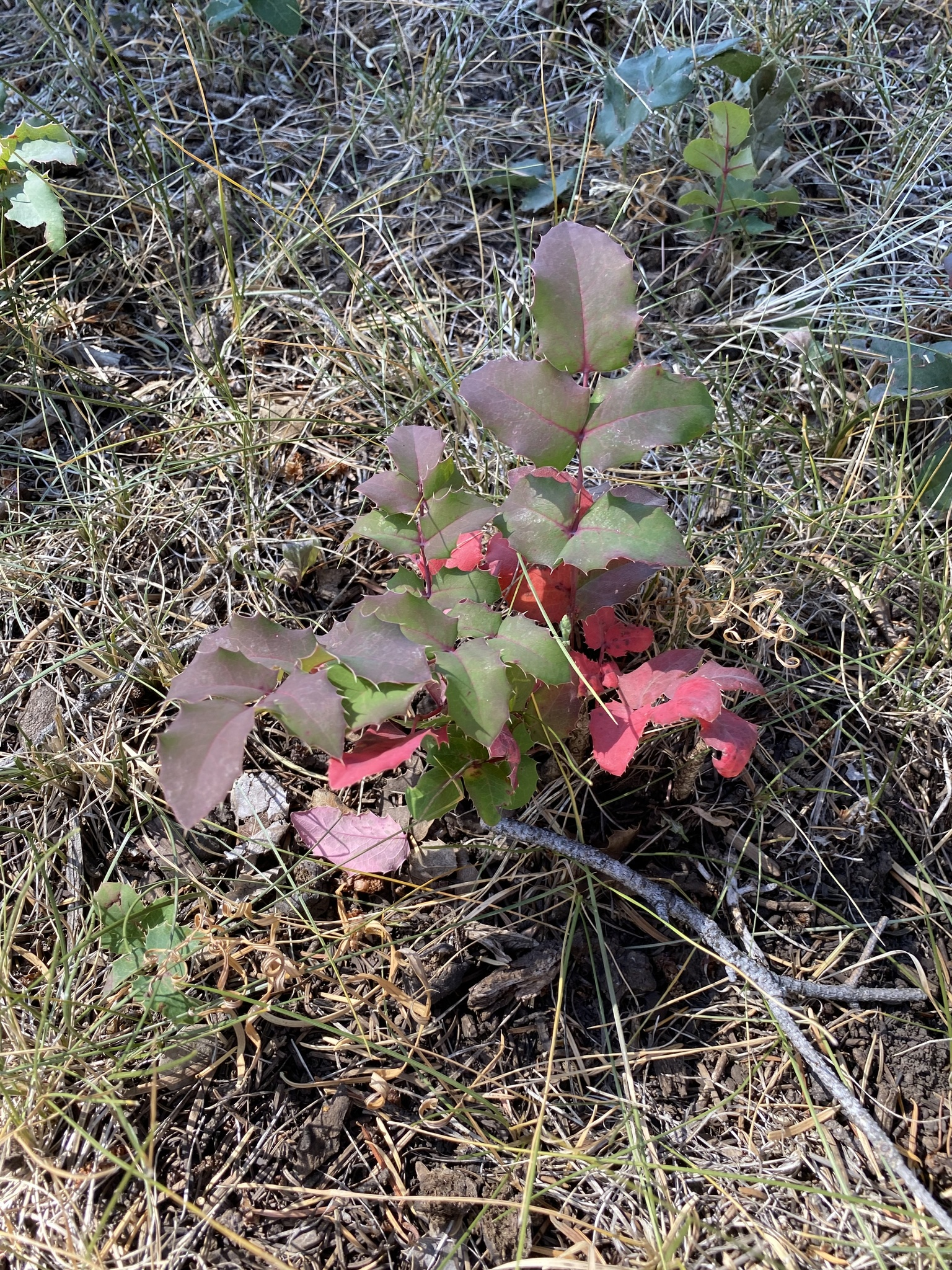
Creeping grapeholly showing fall color, bronze and red leaves, Lincoln National Forest, New Mexico

It is native to the botanical continent of Northern America. In Canada its range is the southern parts of the provinces of Alberta and British Columbia. In the United States it is found throughout the west from Washington (state) to California and eastwards to Montana to New Mexico including all the states between. East of the Rocky Mountains it is also found in the US states of Texas, North Dakota, South Dakota, Nebraska, and Minnesota.

It has also been found as an introduced species in Ontario, Canada and Hungary in the European Union. NatureServe also lists it as introduced to the US states of Pennsylvania and Delaware.

It is widespread, and found at low to mid elevation on dry plateaus, in forests, and on foothills. They are associated with many different ecosystems across the west including the grand fir forests, mountain and basin big sagebrush, Rocky Mountain juniper stands, western larch forests, pinyon-juniper woodlands, lodgepole pine forests in the Sierra Nevadas and Rocky Mountains, ponderosa pine woodlands in the interior and Pacific Northwest, quaking aspen groves across the west, mountain grasslands, oak savannas in New Mexico and Arizona, and in Gambel oak scrub. The plant grows at elevations from 150 metres (490 ft) to 3,000 metres (9,800 ft).

=== Conservation ===
The NatureServe conservation status for the species is "Globally Secure" G5 as evaluated in 2015. Though it is critically imperiled at the state or province level (S1) in Saskatchewan and Texas, imperiled (S2) in North Dakota, and vulnerable (S3) in Alberta.

== Ecology ==
Creeping grapeholly generally increases in response to disturbances in forest ecosystems such as mild fires, severe fires, and logging, though it may be eliminated in the short term by severe intensity fires. As a long lived plant with a protected root system and seeds that are presumed to persist in the soil it recovers quickly from low intensity fires. The above ground stems and parts of the plant in the forest humus are vulnerable to fire damage, but resprouts from undamaged rhizomes in the mineral soil. It decreases over time when the forest canopy is too dense, though it can tolerate significant shade and increases as other plants are negatively impacted by acidification of the soil by conifer trees.

The leaves and stems are slightly poisonous to livestock and not very palatable. It is considered poor forage for both horses and cattle, but is considered fair forage for sheep in Utah and Wyoming. It is browsed by various wild animals. Elk and white tailed deer both consume creeping grapeholly in the winter and to a greater extent when the weather is mild and there is less snow covering the plants. Mule deer also readily consume the leaves and stems during the winter and early spring. Under certain conditions it may make up the largest portion of their diet in winter. It is also eaten to some degree by the Mountain cottontail rabbit and heavily eaten by the snowshoe hare in winter.

The berries are consumed by many species of bird and small mammal, but they are not a significant portion of their diet. Other than the sharp-tailed grouse, no specific bird associations have been recorded.

== Uses ==
The berries are edible, but are considered bitter. Wild foraged berries are used to make jellies or wine with the addition of sugar.

The Tolowa and Karok Indians of Northwest California used the roots for a blood and cough tonic. The Hopi, Paiute, Navajo, Shoshoni, Blackfoot, Cheyenne, Mendocino, and other tribes also used the plant for medicinal, food, and ceremonial needs. Native Americans also used the wood of the stem to produce yellow dyes to stain woven baskets.

== Cultivation ==
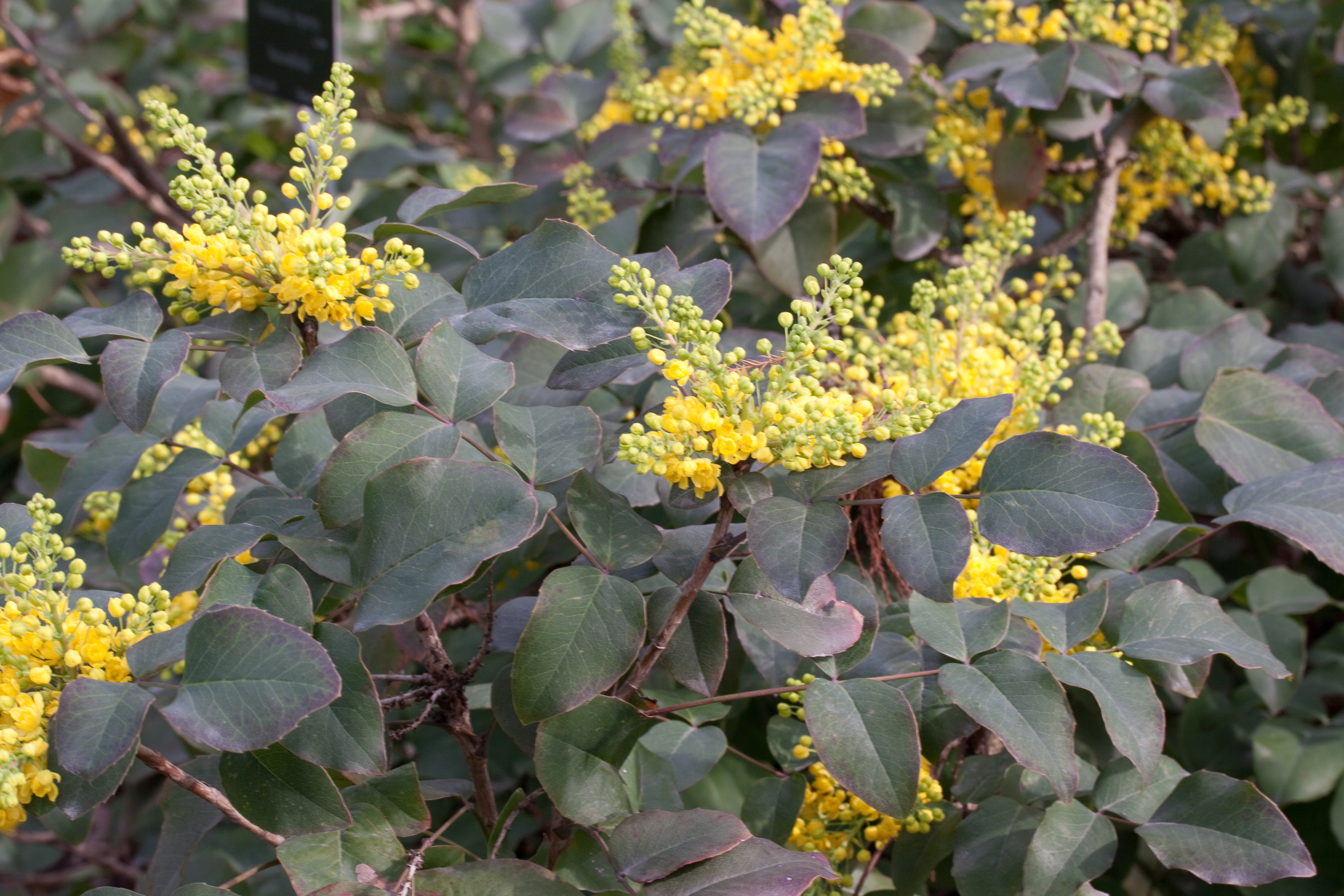
A creeping grapeholly plant with less pronounced leaf spines

Creeping grapeholly is cultivated as an ornamental plant for use in natural landscaping, and in water conserving, drought tolerant, traditional residential, native plant habitat, and wildlife gardens. It is a low water ground cover and is used in gardens under oaks to reduce or eliminate irrigation that can threaten mature trees. It also is a good partner with western North American trees or bushes such as Rocky Mountain bristlecone pine, golden currant, or Rocky Mountain juniper. The foliage is resistant to browsing by deer, though they will be eaten in the winter to some extent. Because of its spreading habit it is used to control erosion in dry areas, though it is not a fast spreading plant. It is the very deep and extensive root system that gives the plants their adaptation to low water conditions. Plants grown from seed are widely available from commercial and non-profit sources, but no cultivars have been developed. Bare root plants are slower to recover and establish than potted plants. The seeds are more likely to germinate after having experienced several cycles of warm and cold weather.

Plants require well drained soil and prefer a soil pH 5.5 to 7.0, but will tolerate 4.5 to 7.5. In winter the leaves may be scalded by excessive sun especially in combination with dry winds. Sources differ on the winter hardiness of creeping grape holly. In their book Nora Harlow and Saxon Holt list USDA zones 4–10. Similarly the North Carolina Extension lists the range as 4b–9b. However, the Missouri Botanic Garden lists a narrower range of just zone 5–8. The leaves are particularly sensitive to airborne fluoride pollution. Unlike other related species such as Berberis aquifolium, Berberis bealei, or Berberis fortunei, creeping grapeholly is immune to the mahonia rust, Cumminsiella mirabilissima.

The size of plants is determined by water availability. With the shortest stem sizes growing with minimal water and larger ones towards the maximum of its moisture tolerance.

== Other sources ==
- Beetle, A. A. Recommended plant names. Univ. Wyoming Agr. Exp. Sta. Res. J. 31. 1970 (Names Beetle)
- Correll, D. S. & M. C. Johnston Manual of the vascular plants of Texas. 1970 (F Tex)
- Erhardt, W. et al. Zander: Handwörterbuch der Pflanzennamen, 17. Auflage. 2002 (Zander ed17)
- FNA Editorial Committee Flora of North America. 1993- (F NAmer)
- Hickman, J. C., ed. The Jepson manual: higher plants of California. 1993 (F CalifJep)
- Hitchcock, C. L. et al. Vascular plants of the Pacific Northwest. 1955–1969 (F Pacif NW)
- Kearney, T. H. & R. H. Peebles Arizona flora, ed. 2. 1969 (F Ariz)
- Martin, W. C. & C. R. Hutchins A flora of New Mexico. 1980 (F New Mex)
- McGuffin, M., J. T. Kartesz, A. Y. Leung, & A. O. Tucker Herbs of commerce, ed. 2. 2000 (Herbs Commerce ed2)
- Welsh, S. L. et al. A Utah flora. Great Basin Naturalist Mem. 9. 1987 (F Utah)
