= Algerita =

Algerita is a common name for several species of barberry, including:

- Berberis haematocarpa, native to southwestern North America
- Berberis trifoliolata, native to southwestern North America
