= Berberis × hortensis =

Scientific classification
- Kingdom: Plantae
- Clade: Tracheophytes
- Clade: Angiosperms
- Clade: Eudicots
- Order: Ranunculales
- Family: Berberidaceae
- Genus: Berberis
- Species: B. × hortensis

Binomial name
- Berberis × hortensis Mabb., 2008

Synonyms
- Mahonia × media C.D.Brickell, 1979

Species of shrub

Berberis × hortensis is an interspecific hybrid shrub. Its parents are Berberis oiwakensis (previously known as Mahonia lomariifolia) and Berberis japonica. It was raised in gardens during the 20th century, and has become an important garden and landscape plant.

== Description ==
The hybrids show some variation, but are generally intermediate in most characteristics between the two parents. The following description is of the clone 'Charity'.

These are medium to large shrubs, reaching 4 m (13 ft) in height. The plants have an upright form, becoming bare at the base. There are between 7 and 11 pairs of leaflets, plus a terminal leaflet. The flowers are in somewhat spreading racemes, often as long as in Berberis japonica. There is some scent to the flowers, but it is not as strong as in B. japonica. Flowering goes on throughout the winter.

Different clones may resemble one or the other parent more closely. It is possible that other species of Berberis have contributed to the stock ascribed to this hybrid. Berberis bealei is considered particularly likely to be one of these as it is often confused with Berberisa japonica. Many clones have an upright architectural form derived from M. oiwakensis subsp. lomariifolia, though some resemble the B. japonica parent rather more.

Plants provide viable seed, and second generation hybrids have been raised.

The plants are especially valued in the garden because of their ornamental leaves, and because they flower through the winter.

== Taxonomy ==
The hybrid was first scientifically described and named as Mahonia × media by Christopher David Brickell in 1979. However, as part of the synonymization of Mahonia with the larger genus Berberis it was renamed Berberis × hortensis by David Mabberley in 2008.

== Origin ==
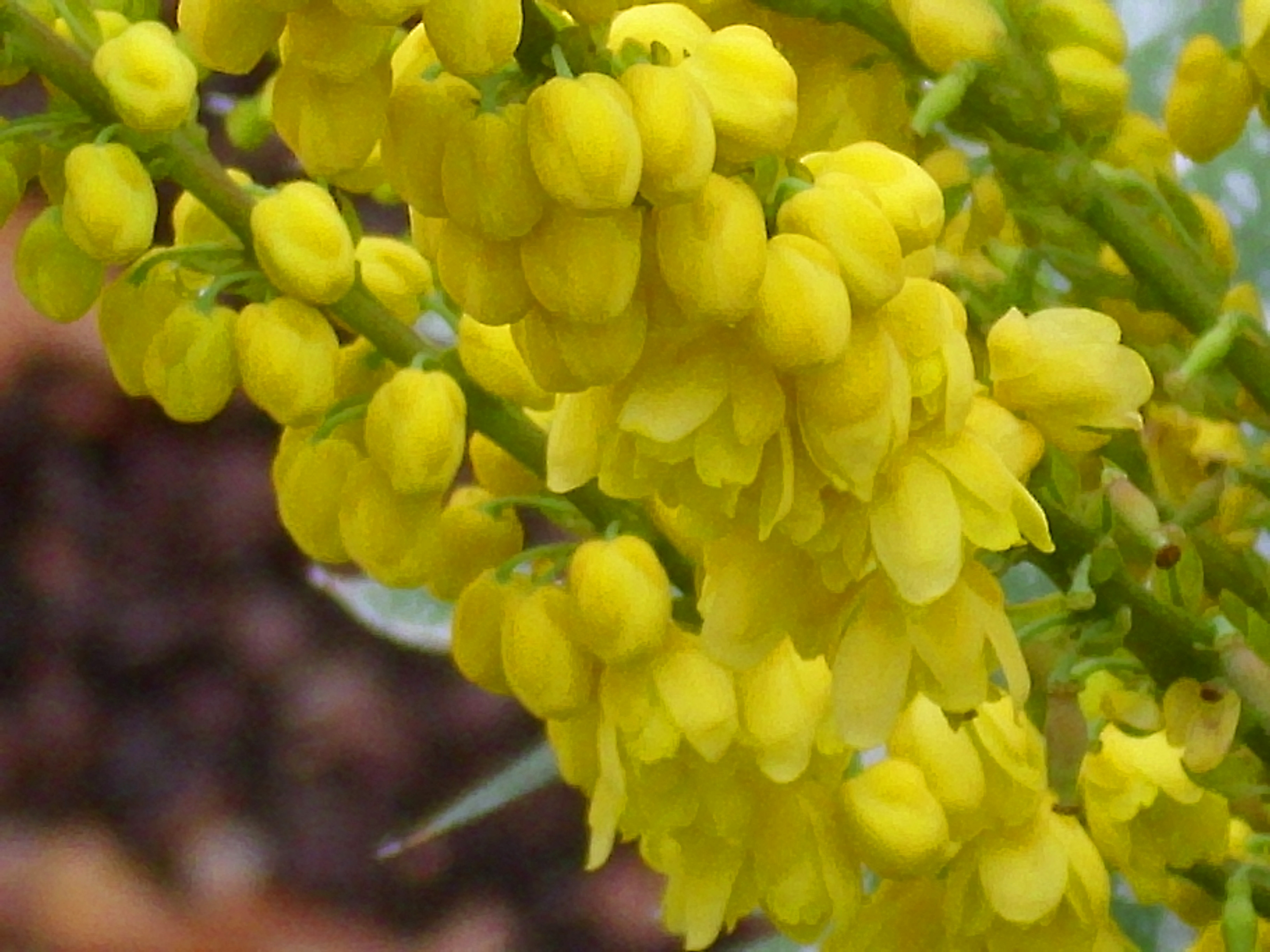
'Winter Sun' inflorescence

The first recorded plant was found in a mixed batch of seedlings from Berberis oiwakensis sourced from mainland China that was raised in Northern Ireland in 1951 or earlier. This plant was given the cultivar name 'Charity' at the Savill Gardens, England, where it first flowered. It has been widely cultivated since under this name. Other clones have since been described and distributed. The following cultivars have gained the Royal Horticultural Society's Award of Garden Merit:-

- 'Buckland'
- 'Lionel Fortescue'
- 'Winter Sun'
