= Red barberry =

Red barberry is a common name for several plants and may refer to:

- Berberis haematocarpa
- Berberis thunbergii
