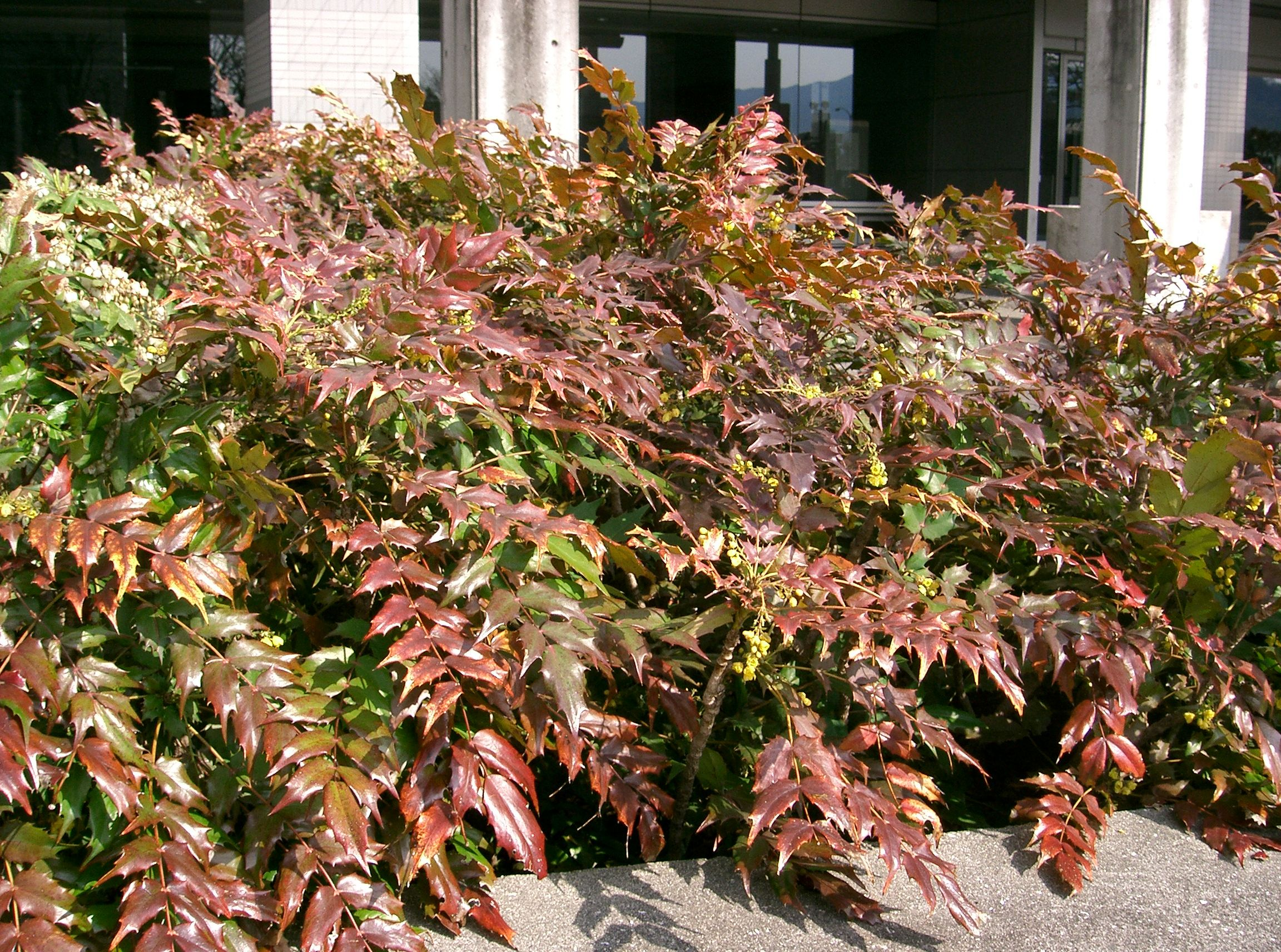

Scientific classification
- Kingdom: Plantae
- Clade: Tracheophytes
- Clade: Angiosperms
- Clade: Eudicots
- Order: Ranunculales
- Family: Berberidaceae
- Genus: Berberis
- Species: B. japonica

Binomial name
- Berberis japonica (Thunb.) Spreng.

Synonyms
- Aquifolium japonicum (Thunb.) Raf.; Berberis japonica var. gracillima (Fedde) Rehder; Berberis tikushiensis (Hayata) Laferr.; Ilex japonica Thunb.; Mahonia japonica (Thunb.) DC.; Mahonia japonica var. gracillima Fedde; Mahonia tikushiensis Hayata

= Berberis japonica =

Species of flowering plant

Berberis japonica is a species of flowering plant in the family Berberidaceae, native to Taiwan. Despite the name, it is not native to Japan, though it has been known in cultivation there for centuries. The wild origins of this species have long puzzled botanists, but wild plants in Taiwan, previously known under the name Mahonia tikushiensis, appear most similar to the cultivated forms of B. japonica.

== Description ==
It is an evergreen shrub growing to 2 m (7 ft) tall by 3 m (10 ft) wide. The foliage is pinnate, glossy dark green above, paler beneath, and sharply toothed. Each leaf usually has six to eight pairs of leaflets together with a single terminal leaflet. The plant produces new shoots regularly from the base, so it is clothed in foliage at all levels.

The small, scented, yellow flowers are borne from autumn through winter into spring. The inflorescences are 25 cm or more long, at first arching and then pendant. Blue or black fruits develop in spring and summer.

== Taxonomy ==
Berberis japonica was initially scientifically described and named by Carl Peter Thunberg as Ilex japonica in 1784, believing it to be a true holly. In 1821 Augustin Pyramus de Candolle reclassified it as Mahonia japonica. Disagreeing with this, Kurt Polycarp Joachim Sprengel classified it in Berberis as Berberis japonica in 1825. A paper was published by Joseph Edward Laferrière in 1997 summarized the arguments for Mahonia being more properly classified as a synonym of Berberis. As of 2023 this is the most common classification by botanists.

== Cultivation ==
The plant is much grown as an ornamental shrub, and for use in landscapes. It is of value for its bold foliage, flowers in flowering season, and as a groundcover landscape shrub. Its spiny foliage invite use in security hedging.

Berberis japonica has received the Royal Horticultural Society's Award of Garden Merit. The hybrid between it and Berberis oiwakensis subsp. lomariifolia is also a popular garden plant. Known as Berberis × hortensis, several cultivars have been developed from it, including 'Charity', 'Winter Sun' and 'Lionel Fortescue'. A hybrid with Berberis napaulensis var. napaulensis (M. siamensis), called Mahonia × lindsayae 'Cantab', though less well known, is a useful garden plant and also holds an Award of Garden Merit.

Berberis bealei, native to mainland China and also widely cultivated, is usually treated as a separate species, but in the past has been listed as a cultivar of Berberis japonica. Its most obvious differences from B. japonica are in shorter, upright flowering racemes and wider leaflets.
