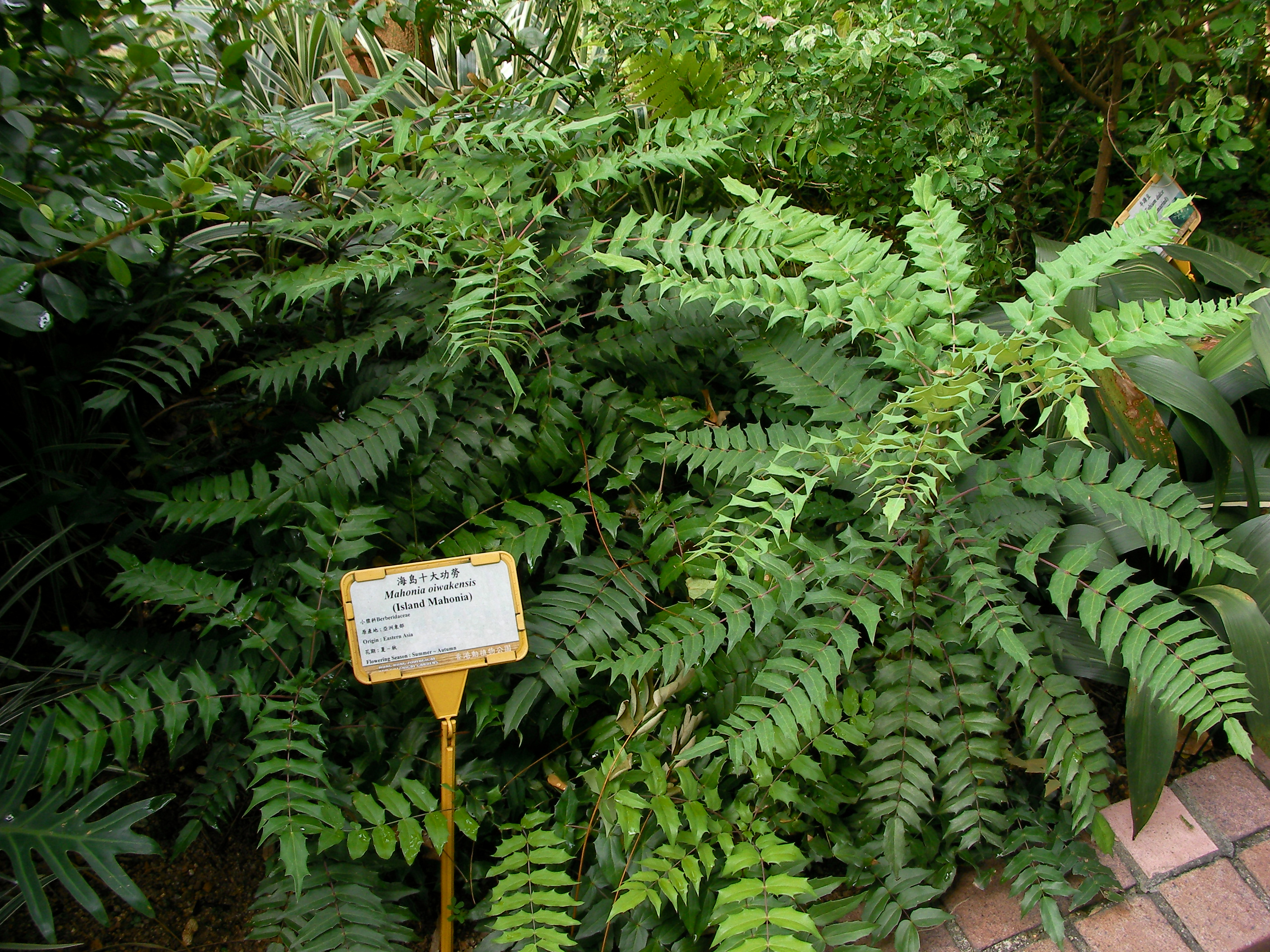
- Habit
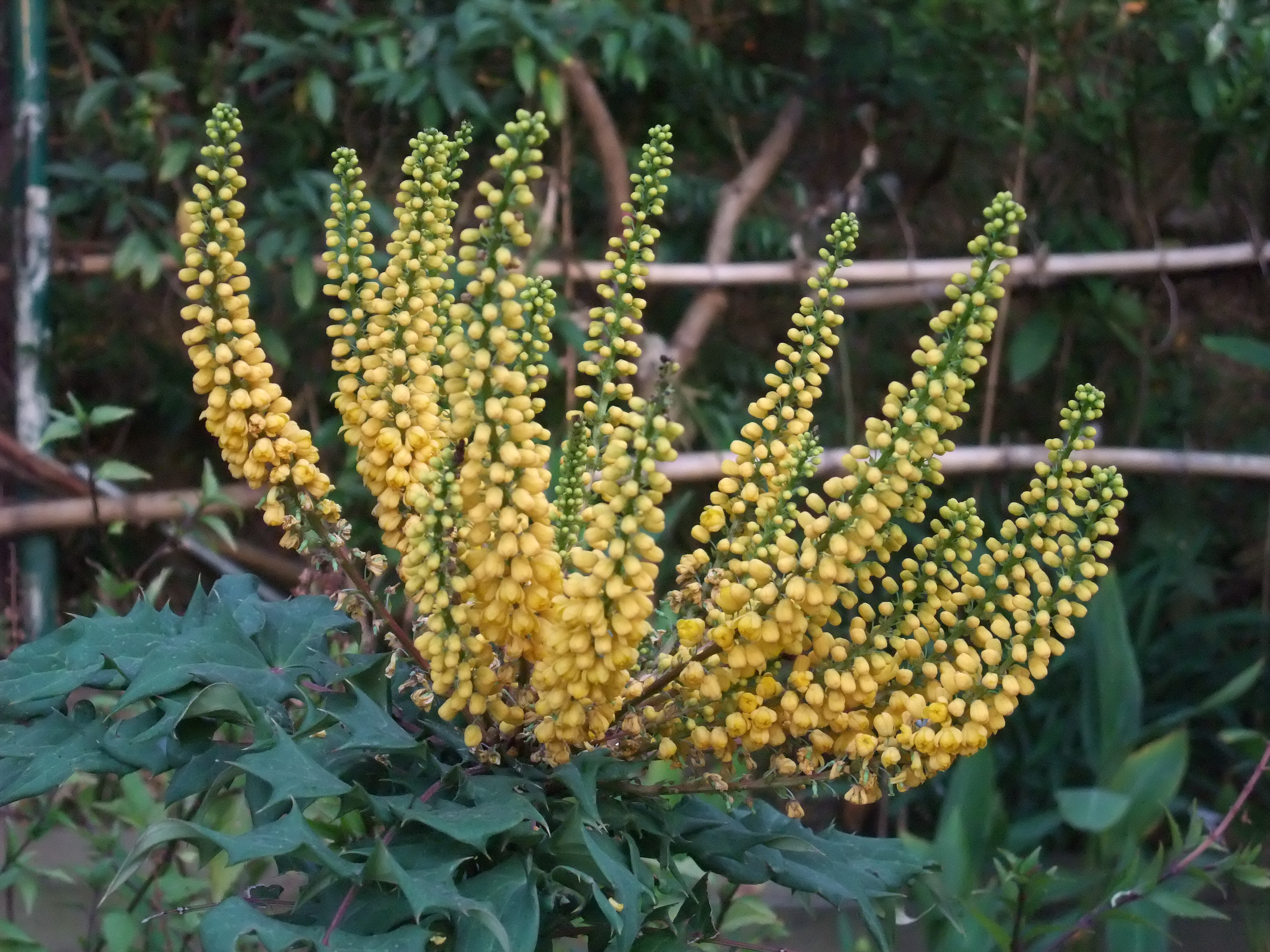
- Flowers

Conservation status
- Vulnerable (IUCN 2.3)

Scientific classification
- Kingdom: Plantae
- Clade: Tracheophytes
- Clade: Angiosperms
- Clade: Eudicots
- Order: Ranunculales
- Family: Berberidaceae
- Genus: Berberis
- Species: B. oiwakensis

Binomial name
- Berberis oiwakensis Hayata

Synonyms
- Synonyms: Berberis caelicolor (S.Y.Bao) Laferr. (1997); Berberis discolorifolia (Ahrendt) Laferr. (1997); Berberis lomariifolia (Takeda) Laferr. (1997); Berberis lomariifolia var. estylis (C.Y.Wu ex S.Y.Bao) Laferr. (1997); Berberis puca Laferr. (1997); Mahonia alexandri C.K.Schneid. (1917); Mahonia caelicolor S.Y.Bao (1987); Mahonia discolorifolia Ahrendt (1961); Mahonia hainanensis C.M.Hu, Ze X.Li & F.W.Xing (1994); Mahonia lomariifolia Takeda (1917); Mahonia lomariifolia var. estylis C.Y.Wu ex S.Y.Bao (1987); Mahonia morrisonensis Takeda (1917); Mahonia oiwakensis Hayata (1916); Mahonia oiwakensis subsp. lomariifolia (Takeda) J.M.H.Shaw (2011); Mahonia oiwakensis var. tenuifoliola J.M.H.Shaw (2011)

= Berberis oiwakensis =

Species of flowering plant

Berberis oiwakensis is a species of plant in the barberry family, Berberidaceae. It is native to Taiwan, China (Guizhou, Hong Kong, Sichuan, Xizang (Tibet) and Yunnan) and Myanmar, where it occurs at elevations of 600 to 3800 m. It has recently been found naturalized in South Africa.

== Description ==
Berberis oiwakensis is a shrub or tree up to 7 m tall. Leaves are up to 45 cm long, compound with 12-20 pairs of leaflets plus a larger terminal one, dark green above, yellow-green below. The inflorescence is a fascicled raceme up to 25 cm long. The berries are egg-shaped, dark blue, sometimes almost black, up to 8 mm long.

== Taxonomy ==
Berberis oiwakensis was first scientifically described and named Mahonia oiwakensis by Bunzō Hayata in 1916. One year later Hisayoshi Takeda described a species that he named Mahonia lomariifolia. Under that name, it was considered to occur only in mainland China, while Mahonia oiwakensis was limited to Taiwan. Modern taxonomic sources unite the two as a single species with priority going to the first description. Because of differences between the Taiwanese and mainland Chinese plants, Julian Shaw described them as separate subspecies of Mahonia oiwakensis in 2011. However, this has not yet been accepted by the majority of botanists. In addition, there has been a longstanding disagreement on if Mahonia should be more properly classified as a synonym of Berberis. A paper was published by Joseph Edward Laferrière in 1997 summarized the arguments in favor of classification in Berberis and published a new name for the species, Berberis oiwakensis. As of 2023, this is the most widely accepted classification.

=== Hybrids ===
Berberis oiwakensis is one parent of the important garden hybrid Berberis × hortensis, which includes popular cultivars such as 'Charity', 'Winter Sun' and 'Lionel Fortescue' (the other parent is Berberis japonica). It is also a parent of the cultivar 'Arthur Menzies', though with Berberis bealei as the other parent. In the wild in Taiwan, Berberis oiwakensis appears to hybridize with wild Berberis japonica.

Berberis oiwakensis subsp. lomariifolia has gained the Royal Horticultural Society's Award of Garden Merit.
