= Mahonia imbricata =

Scientific classification
- Kingdom: Plantae
- Clade: Tracheophytes
- Clade: Angiosperms
- Clade: Eudicots
- Order: Ranunculales
- Family: Berberidaceae
- Genus: Mahonia
- Species: M. imbricata

Binomial name
- Mahonia imbricata T. S. Ying & Boufford

Species of shrub

Mahonia imbricata is a shrub in the family Berberidaceae, first described in 2001. It is endemic to China, known from Guizhou and Yunnan Provinces. As of 2023 the status of the species is uncertain with POWO listing it as an unplaced species, one for which there is not enough information to determine its validity.
