= Mahonia cardiophylla =

Scientific classification
- Kingdom: Plantae
- Clade: Tracheophytes
- Clade: Angiosperms
- Clade: Eudicots
- Order: Ranunculales
- Family: Berberidaceae
- Genus: Mahonia
- Species: M. cardiophylla

Binomial name
- Mahonia cardiophylla T.S.Ying & Boufford

Species of shrub

Mahonia cardiophylla is a shrub in the Berberidaceae described as a species in 2001. it is endemic to China, native to the provinces of Guangxi, Hunan, Sichuan, and Yunnan. However, as of 2023 Plants of the World Online reports it as an "unplaced" species name that cannot be accepted or correctly placed as a synonym of an accepted name. Similarly World Flora Online describes it as "unchecked", a species that is awaiting taxonomic scrutiny.
