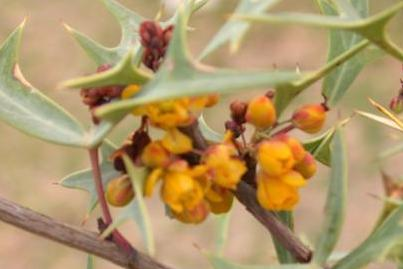

Conservation status
- Secure (NatureServe)

Scientific classification
- Kingdom: Plantae
- Clade: Tracheophytes
- Clade: Angiosperms
- Clade: Eudicots
- Order: Ranunculales
- Family: Berberidaceae
- Genus: Berberis
- Species: B. trifoliolata

Binomial name
- Berberis trifoliolata Moric.

Synonyms
- Alloberberis trifoliolata (Moric.) C.C.Yu & K.F.Chung (2017); Alloberberis trifoliolata var. glauca (I.M.Johnst.) C.C.Yu & K.F.Chung (2017); Berberis roemeriana Scheele (1849); Berberis trifoliata Hartw. ex Lindl. (1841); Berberis trifoliolata var. glauca (I.M.Johnst.) M.C.Johnst. ex Laferr. (1991); Mahonia trifoliolata (Moric.) Fedde (1901); Mahonia trifoliata (Hartw. ex Lindl.) Jacques & Hérincq (1845); Mahonia trifoliolata var. glauca I.M.Johnst. (1950); Odostemon trifoliolatus (Moric.) A.Heller (1912)

= Berberis trifoliolata =

Species of flowering plant

Berberis trifoliolata is a species of flowering plant in the family Berberidaceae, in southwestern North America. Common names include agarita, agrito, algerita, currant-of-Texas, wild currant, and chaparral berry. The name agarita comes from the Spanish verb agarrar, which means "to grab". The ending -ita is a diminutive often added to little things, so agarita means "grabs a little". This was probably said because the bush is a bit scratchy but does not have significant spines. Typical characteristics are grey-green to blue-grey leaves, yellow flowers in February to April and the red berries appearing in May. The most important harvest organ are the berries, though the roots and seeds can also be used.

== Distribution ==
The shrub is native to Arizona, New Mexico, and Texas in the Southwestern United States, and across northeastern Mexico as far south as Durango and San Luis Potosí. It mainly grows in areas that it is native in; there is no cultivation in other countries. In Texas, it is found on rocky slopes and cliffs, and in thickets and open woods, from coastal South Texas northwest to the Trans-Pecos region. It is one of the most common bushes in Hill Country.

In Texas, it has reached areas of up to 300,000 hectares (730,000 acres), but it is commonly seen as a pest there due to its rapid spread. Especially large coverage can be found on the Edwards Plateau in Texas. Mechanical and chemical control have been attempted, but few economically viable results have been achieved due to agarita's quick recovery ability and its resistance to many herbicides.

There are also no ethnographic records describing the use of the species Berberis trifoliolata, but a number of records indicate the use of Berberis haematocarpa and Berberis repens by the Native Americans of the Plains. Virtually every part of the plant has been used for food, medicine and dye throughout history.

== Description ==
Berberis trifoliolata is an evergreen shrub that grows up to 1–2.5 m (3–8 ft) tall and wide. It has rigid and spreading branches, often forming thickets. The foliage is gray-green to blue-gray, and the leaflets have sharp points at the ends.

== Taxonomy ==
Berberis trifoliolata was scientifically described and named by Stefano Moricand in 1841. As part of the disagreement among botanists regarding the correct classification of many species of Mahonia as part of Berberis, it was renamed Mahonia trifoliolata by Friedrich Karl Georg Fedde in 1901. A further synonym was added by Amos Arthur Heller with his argument that it belonged in the genus Odostemon proposed by Constantine Samuel Rafinesque in 1817, as Odostemon trifoliolatus. A paper published by Joseph Edward Laferrière in 1997 summarized the arguments for Mahonia being more properly classified as a synonym of Berberis and supported the species being known under its original name of Berberis trifoliolata. As of 2023, this is the most common classification by botanists.

== Ecology ==
The plant is well adapted to hot temperatures and dry conditions. In areas where it occurs naturally, the fruits are eaten by birds and small animals use the plant for cover. The shrub is also considered to be a good nectar source for honey bees and other insects. As the trifoliate leaves are tough and spiny, they are not eaten by cattle or deer.

== Uses ==
The bright red edible fruits of the agarita can be harvested around late April to early May. The fruits contain a slightly sweet and sour juice; when expelled, the juice can be used to produce an agarita wine or consumed as a fruit juice drink. The berries can also be used for jelly, pie or cobblers; the tart flavor is reported to be pleasant to eat when mixed with sugar. The fruits contain seeds and can be used to germinate new agarita plants, or be roasted as a coffee alternative. However, a high quantity of seeds makes raw consumption difficult.

Native Americans of the Apache, Chiricahua, and Mescalero tribes used the fresh and preserved fruit for food, and the wood shavings as a traditional eye medicine and a yellow dye for hides. During early pioneering years, the alkaloid berberine in the agarita roots was used to make a yellow dye. Agarita also has uses in medicine; its medicinal value is created mainly by the alkaloids in the roots, and throughout history, it was used to treat ailments ranging from fevers to stomach troubles and open wounds. It was also used as a laxative by the Ramah Navajo and other groups native to the Pacific Northwest. The roots are known to possess antiseptic qualities and are therefore used to treat wounds, skin or gum problems.

=== Cultivation ===
Berberis trifoliolata is cultivated as an ornamental plant for use in desert-region gardens. Berberis trifoliolata is exceptionally drought and heat tolerant. Thus, they also grow in dry periods without being watered. It usually grows best in full sun, but it can also be cultivated in light shade. Additionally, the plant is not very cold tolerant and is therefore especially grown in places where winters are short and mild. The plant can be reproduced generatively with the seeds. The seeds need a cold stratification of two to three months. Therefore, it can be sown through summer or autumn and the seeds then germinate in spring. As it is a perennial plant, it does not need to be sown yearly and has a very long lifespan. Berberis trifoliolata tolerates a variety of soil textures like loam, clay, clay-loam and gravel. It usually grows very well in dry, well-drained soils. Usually, the plant occurs on soils derived from limestone parent material and therefore tolerates alkaline soils.

There are not many known insect or disease problems in agarita. Sometimes leaf spots and rusts - especially black stem rust - may occur. Stem rust, caused by the fungus Puccinia graminis, is an agriculturally important disease in wheat, barley, oats, rye, and triticale. Since Berberis trifoliolata acts as an intermediate host, farmers have removed the bushes to reduce the prevalence of disease. However, typically the climate is too arid for the cultivation of cereals in areas where the plant grows naturally.

As the roots contain a large amount of the alkaloid berberine, they inhibit some root fungi and are therefore relatively resistant to pathogens.

== Biology ==
Reproduction occurs through seeds and sprouts. The seed is produced and dispersed during summer, it usually germinates in the following spring. Dispersal happens through a variety of birds and mammals. The sprouts represent the vegetative reproduction; they usually grow from the roots or the root crown. This growth is especially vigorous when the above ground vegetation is removed or damaged (through fires, cutting, etc.). The flowers usually bloom from February until March. The berries ripen from April to July, but peak ripeness is usually already reached in May.

== Gallery ==
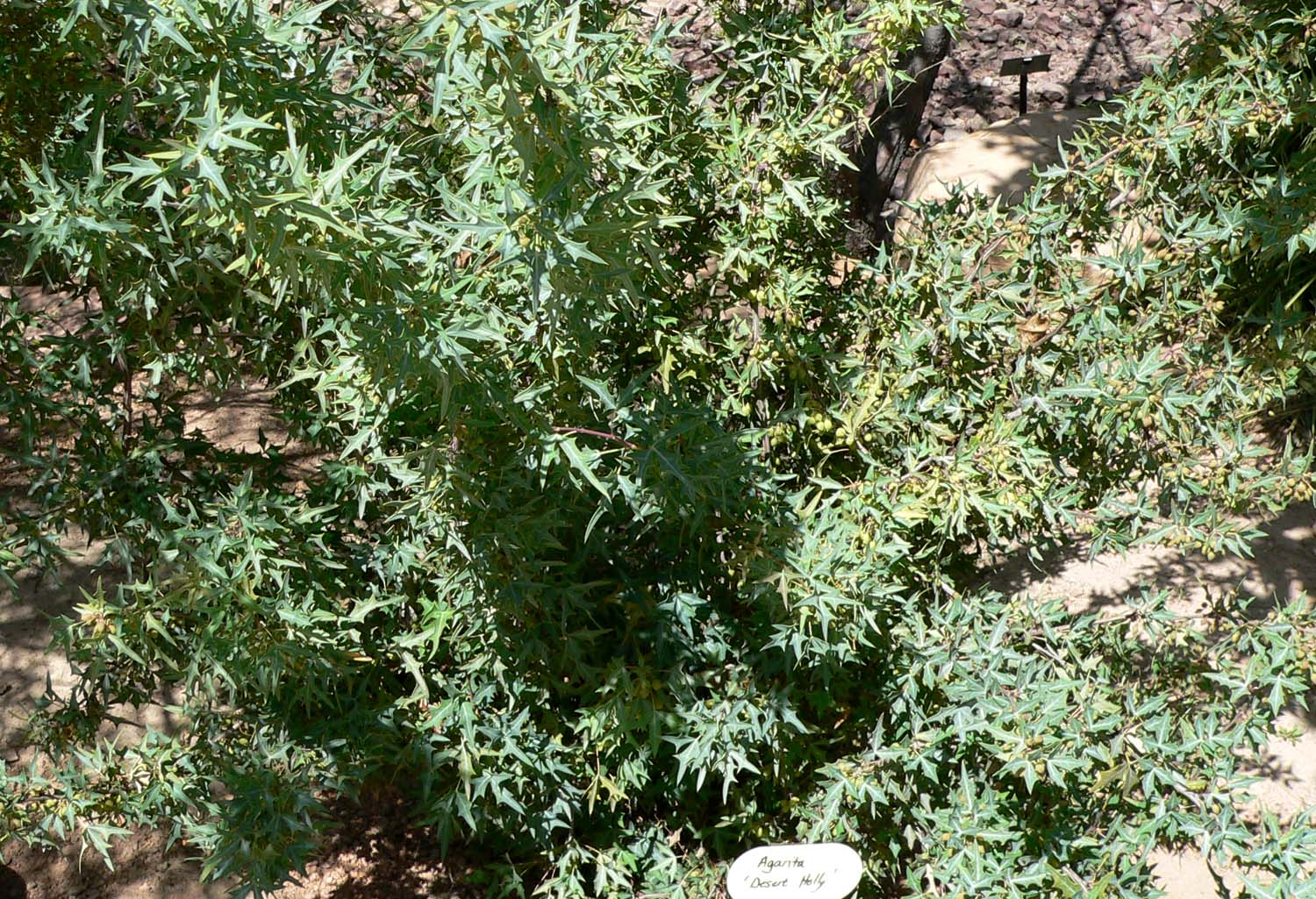
Overall form

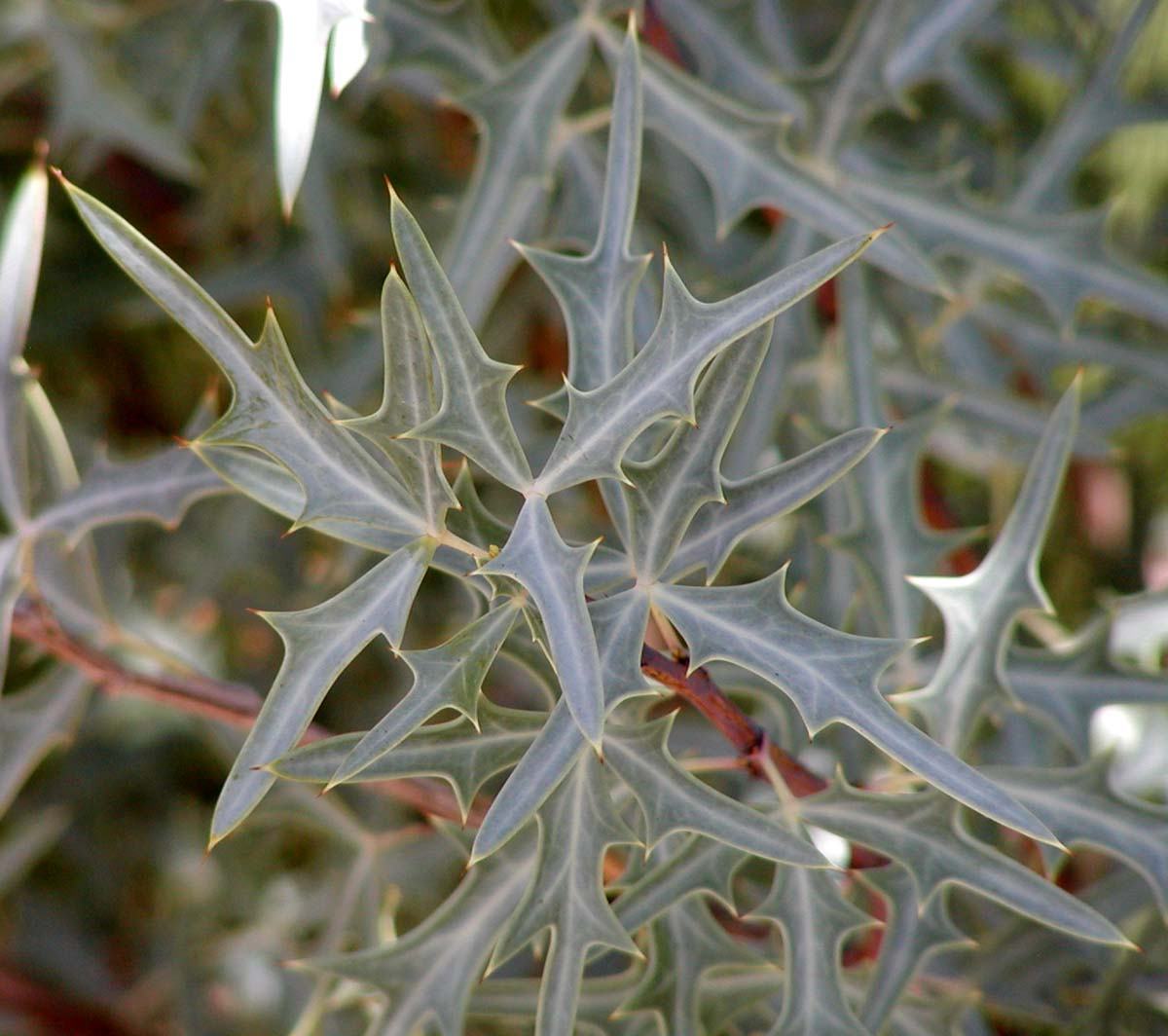
Leaf arrangement

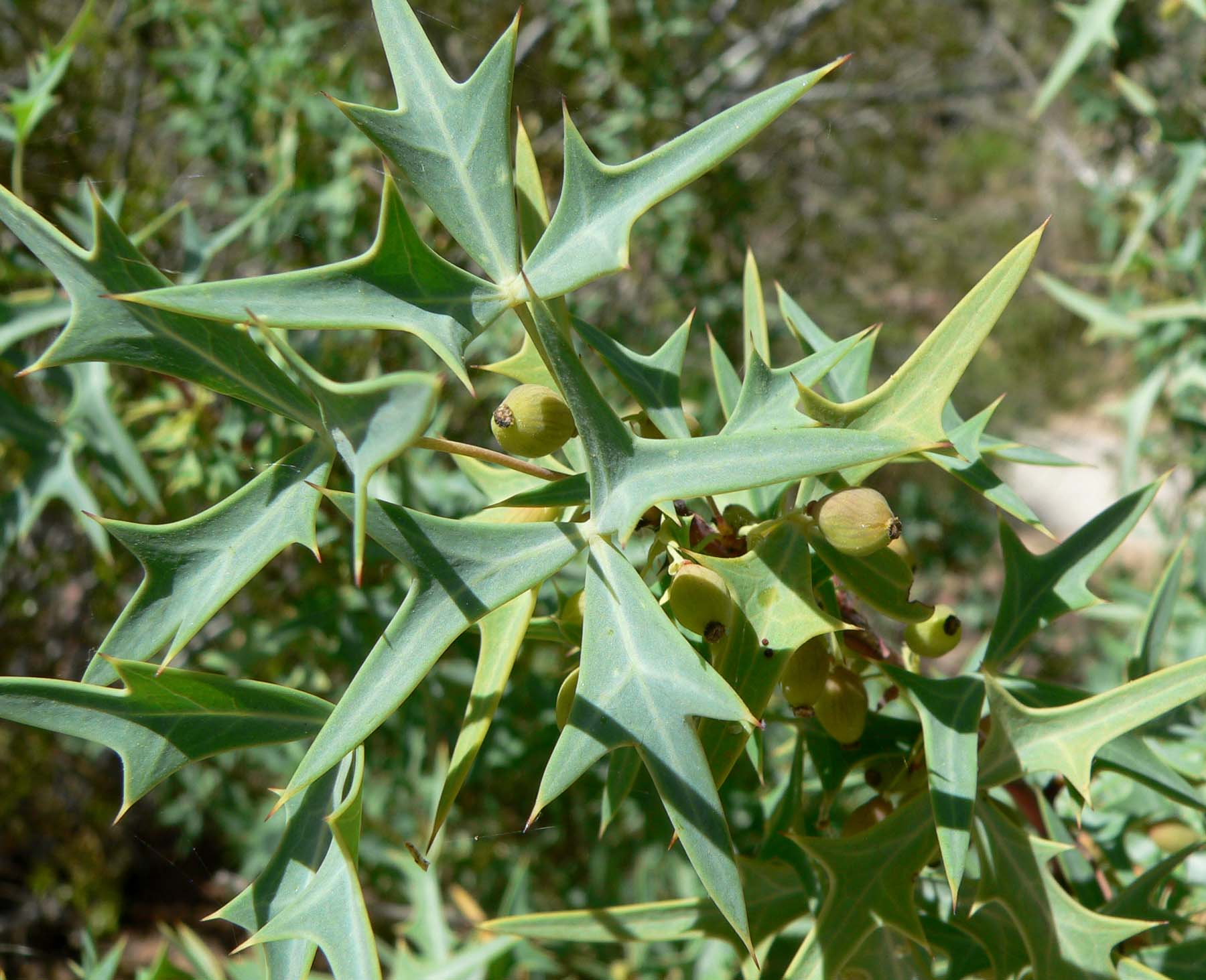
Immature fruits in spring

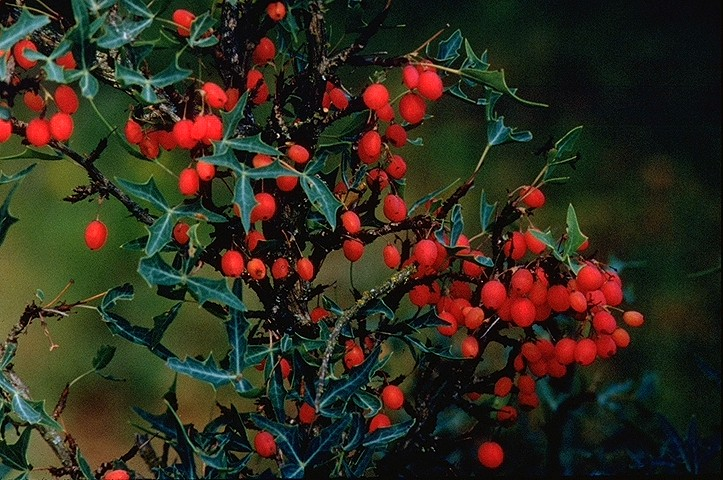
Ripe fruits
