= Berberis breviracema =

Scientific classification
- Kingdom: Plantae
- Clade: Tracheophytes
- Clade: Angiosperms
- Clade: Eudicots
- Order: Ranunculales
- Family: Berberidaceae
- Genus: Berberis
- Species: B. breviracema

Binomial name
- Berberis breviracema (Y.S.Wang & P.K.Hsiao) Laferr.

Synonyms
- Mahonia breviracema Y.S.Wang & P.G.Xiao; Mahonia monodens J.Y.Wu, H.N.Qin & S.Z.He

Species of shrub

Berberis breviracema is a shrub in the Berberidaceae described as a species in 1985. It is endemic to China, native to Guangxi and probably Guizhou Provinces.

== Taxonomy ==
Berberis bracteolata was initially scientifically described by Yu Sheng Wang and Pei Ken Hsiao and named Mahonia breviracema. In 1997 a paper was published by Joseph Edward Laferrière summarizing arguments for synonymizing genus Mahonia with genus Berberis and presenting a list of correct names that has since become the most commonly accepted classification of this and other species as of 2023.
