= Berberis tibetensis =

Scientific classification
- Kingdom: Plantae
- Clade: Tracheophytes
- Clade: Angiosperms
- Clade: Eudicots
- Order: Ranunculales
- Family: Berberidaceae
- Genus: Berberis
- Species: B. tibetensis

Binomial name
- Berberis tibetensis Laferr.

Synonyms
- Mahonia taronensis Hand.-Mazz. (1923 publ. 1924)

Species of shrub

Berberis tibetensis is a shrub in the family Berberidaceae described as a species in 1923. It is endemic to China, found in Tibet and Yunnan.

== Taxonomy ==
Berberis tibetensis was initially scientifically described and named Mahonia taronensis by Heinrich von Handel-Mazzetti. Because of its previous name it was sometimes confused with Berberis taronensis, a different species, also native to Yunnan and Tibet.

A paper published by Joseph Edward Laferrière in 1997 summarized the arguments for Mahonia being more properly classified as a synonym of Berberis renaming it Berberis tibetensis. As of 2023 this is the most common classification by botanists.
