= Berberis taronensis =

Conservation status
- Vulnerable (IUCN 3.1)

Scientific classification
- Kingdom: Plantae
- Clade: Tracheophytes
- Clade: Angiosperms
- Clade: Eudicots
- Order: Ranunculales
- Family: Berberidaceae
- Genus: Berberis
- Species: B. taronensis

Binomial name
- Berberis taronensis Ahrendt

Species of plant

Berberis taronensis is a shrub in the Berberidaceae described as a species in 1941. It is native to Tibet and Yunnan in China.

The species is listed as vulnerable.

Berberis taronensis should not be confused with Mahonia taronensis (a different species, also native to Yunnan and Tibet, synonymous with Berberis tibetensis).
