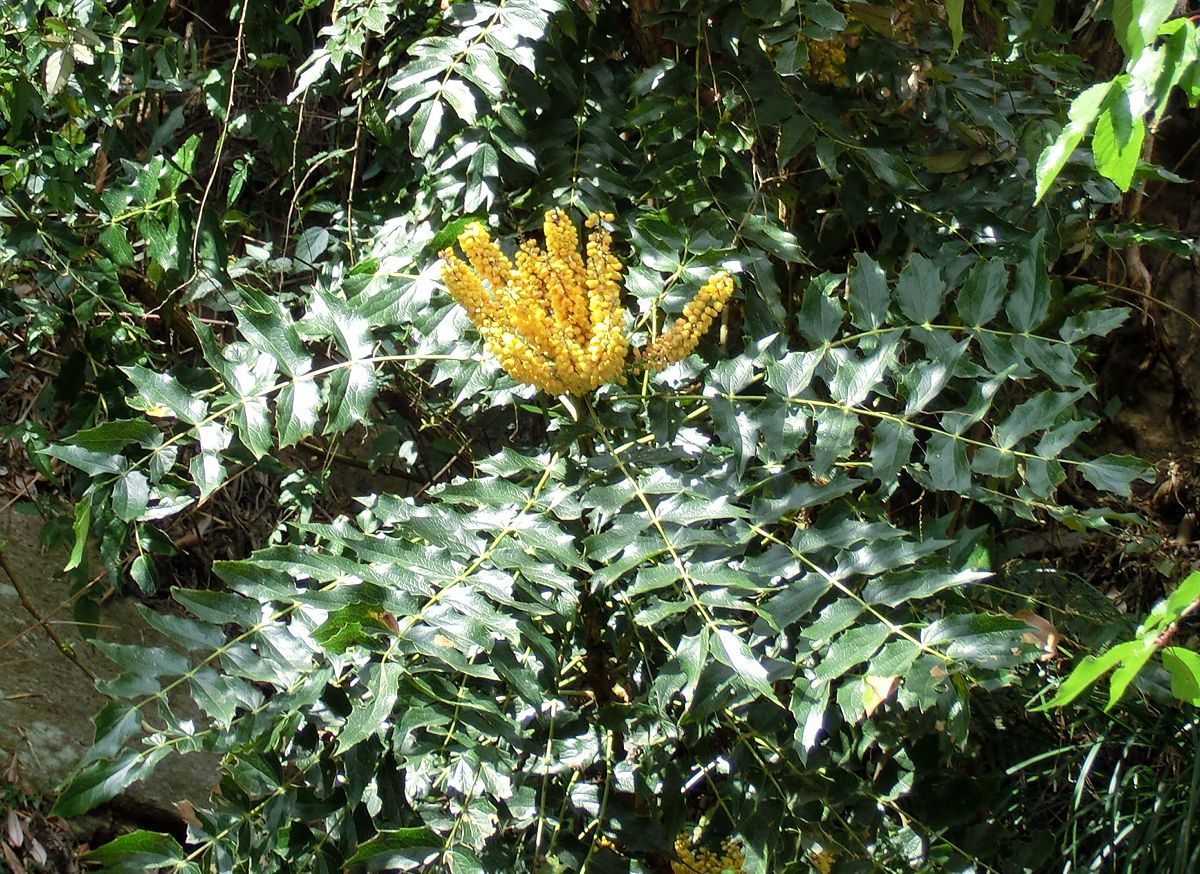

Scientific classification
- Kingdom: Plantae
- Clade: Tracheophytes
- Clade: Angiosperms
- Clade: Eudicots
- Order: Ranunculales
- Family: Berberidaceae
- Genus: Berberis
- Species: B. napaulensis

Binomial name
- Berberis napaulensis (DC.) Spreng.

Synonyms
- Mahonia napaulensis DC.

= Berberis napaulensis =

Species of shrub

Berberis napaulensis (syn. B. duclouxiana; Nepali: जमाने मान्द्रो, Chinese: 尼泊尔十大功劳) is a shrub in the family Berberidaceae described as a species in 1821. It is native to the Himalayas (northwestern India, Nepal, Bhutan, Sikkim, Assam), and into the mountains of southwestern China (Tibet, Yunnan, Guangxi, and Sichuan), Myanmar, Thailand, and Vietnam, growing at altitudes of 1,200-3,000 metres. This species is used medicinally throughout the Sikkim Eastern Himalayas.

== Description ==
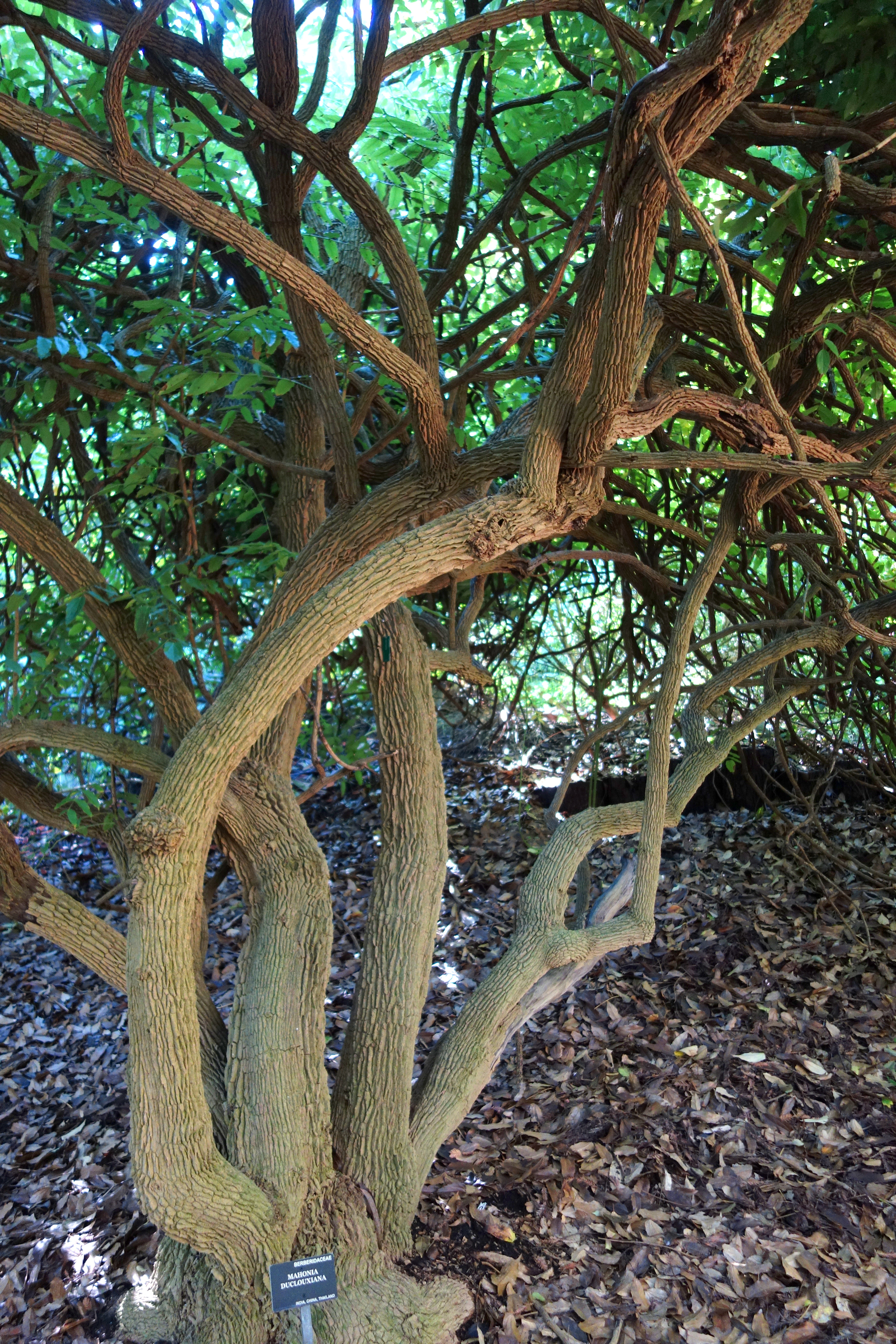
Labeled as Mahonia duclouxiana - San Francisco Botanical Garden

Berberis napaulensis is an evergreen shrub (rarely a small tree) that grows to 1–7 metres tall. The leaves are 17–70 centimetres long and 7–22 cm broad, with 4-12 pairs of leaflets plus a larger terminal leaflet, all shiny above, yellowish-green below, and with spined margins. The flowers are yellow, borne in large panicles. The berries are spherical, deep purple, 5–8 millimetres in diameter.

== Taxonomy ==
Berberis napaulensis was initially scientifically named and described by Augustin Pyramus de Candolle as Mahonia napaulensis in 1821. As part of a long running debate between botanists on whether Mahonia should be a synonym of Berberis, Kurt Polycarp Joachim Sprengel classified it as Berberis napaulensis in 1825. A paper published by Joseph Edward Laferrière in 1997 gave arguments in favour of Berberis as the correct classification, while Yu & Chung (2017) recommended acceptance of four genera including Mahonia as distinct. As of 2023, the Plants of the World Online database (POWO) follows Laferrière's single-genus classification. The Flora of China treats the species in Mahonia; it also treats Berberis duclouxiana as a separate species, as Mahonia duclouxiana.

=== Varieties ===
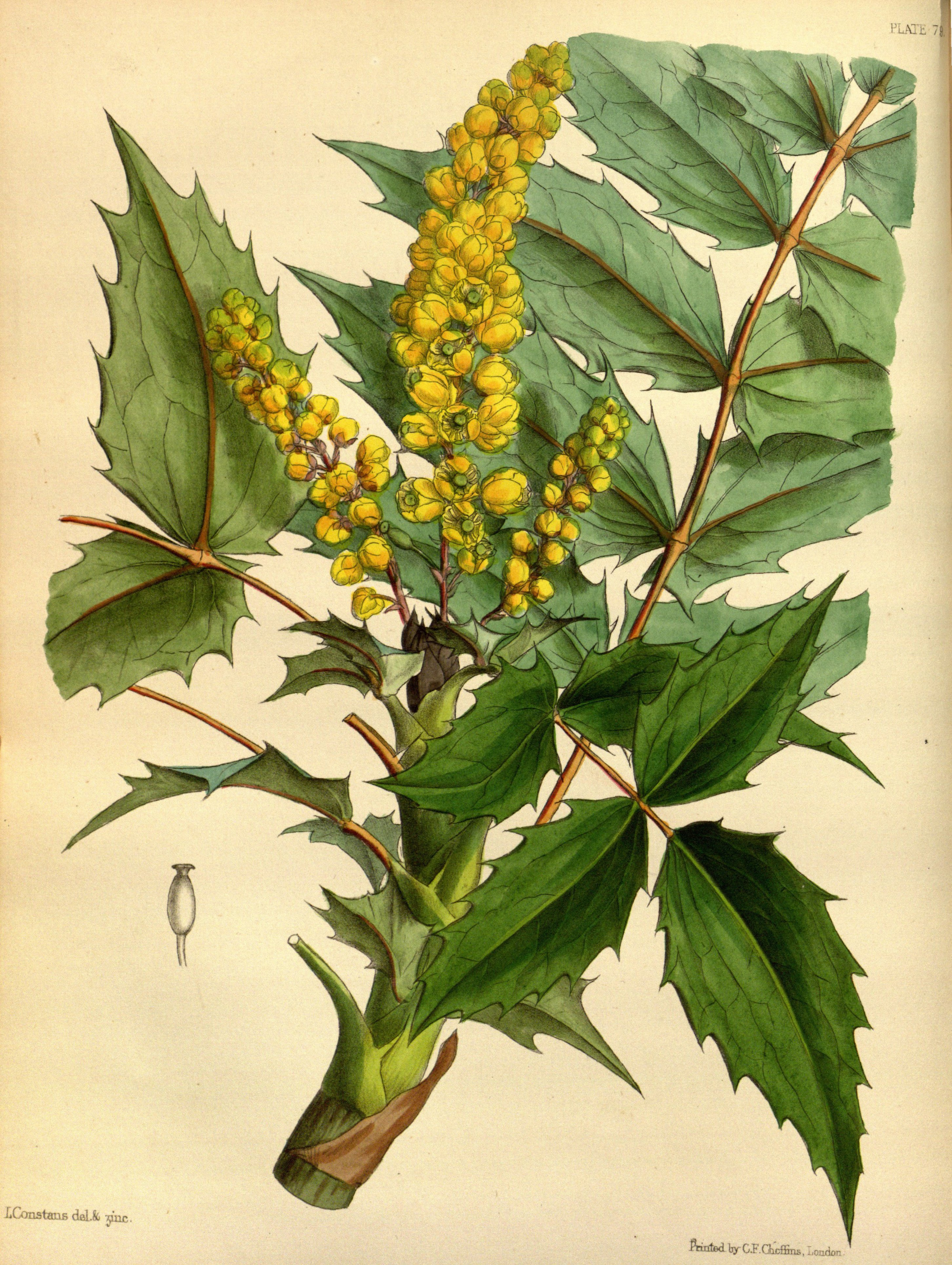
Berberis napaulensis

As of 2023 two varieties are recognised by POWO. Numerous synonyms are listed by POWO for each of the varieties recognised there, a very large number in the case of Berberis napaulensis var. napaulensis.

- Berberis napaulensis var. napaulensis
- Berberis acanthifolia Wall. ex Walp.
- Berberis annamica (Gagnep.) Laferr.
- Berberis borealis (Takeda) Laferr.
- Berberis borealis var. parryi (Ahrendt) Laferr.
- Berberis dolichostylis (Takeda) Laferr.
- Berberis duclouxiana (Gagnep.) Laferr.
- Berberis duclouxiana var. hilaica (Ahrendt) Laferr.
- Berberis flavida (C.K.Schneid.) Laferr.
- Berberis flavida var. integrifoliola (Hand.-Mazz.) Laferr.
- Berberis gautamae Laferr.
- Berberis griffithii (Takeda) Laferr.
- Berberis intermedia (A.Vilm.) Anon.
- Berberis keikoe Laferr.
- Berberis leschenaultii Wall. ex Wight & Arn.
- Berberis longlinensis (Y.S.Wang & P.G.Xiao) Laferr.
- Berberis manipurensis (Takeda) Laferr.
- Berberis miccia Buch.-Ham. ex D.Don
- Berberis napaulensis var. leschenaultii (Wall. ex Wight & Arn.) Hook.f. & Thomson
- Berberis pomensis (Ahrendt) Laferr.
- Berberis salweenensis (Ahrendt) Laferr.
- Berberis siamensis (Takeda) Laferr.
- Berberis tsailunii Laferr.
- Mahonia acanthifolia Wall. ex G.Don
- Mahonia annamica Gagnep.
- Mahonia borealis Takeda
- Mahonia borealis var. perryi Ahrendt
- Mahonia dolichostylis Takeda
- Mahonia duclouxiana Gagnep.
- Mahonia duclouxiana var. hilaica Ahrendt
- Mahonia flavida C.K.Schneid.
- Mahonia flavida f. integrifolia Hand.-Mazz.
- Mahonia griffithii Takeda
- Mahonia intermedia A.Vilm.
- Mahonia leschenaultii (Wall. ex Wight & Arn.) Anon.
- Mahonia longlinensis Y.S.Wang & P.G.Xiao
- Mahonia mairei Takeda
- Mahonia manipurensis Takeda
- Mahonia napaulensis var. leschenaultii (Wall. ex Wight & Arn.) Fedde
- Mahonia nepalensis DC. ex Dippel
- Mahonia pomensis Ahrendt
- Mahonia salweenensis Ahrendt
- Mahonia siamensis Takeda
- Mahonia sikkimensis Takeda
- Berberis napaulensis var. pycnophylla (Fedde) Laferr.
- Mahonia napaulensis var. pycnophylla Fedde
- Mahonia pycnophylla (Fedde) Takeda

== Ecology ==
In Chiang Mai Province, Thailand, a species of rust fungus Pucciniosira cornuta (synonym of Gambleola cornuta Massee (1898)) infects Berberis nepalensis.
