= Bare root =

Bare root is a technique of arboriculture whereby a plant is removed from soil in a dormant state, from which it can more rapidly acclimate to new soil conditions.

Bare root stock should be planted within 48 hours of receipt for optimal results.

== Examples ==
Bare rooting is often used as a method of propagating rose canes.

== See also ==
- Fruit tree propagation
- Plant propagation
- Division (horticulture)
