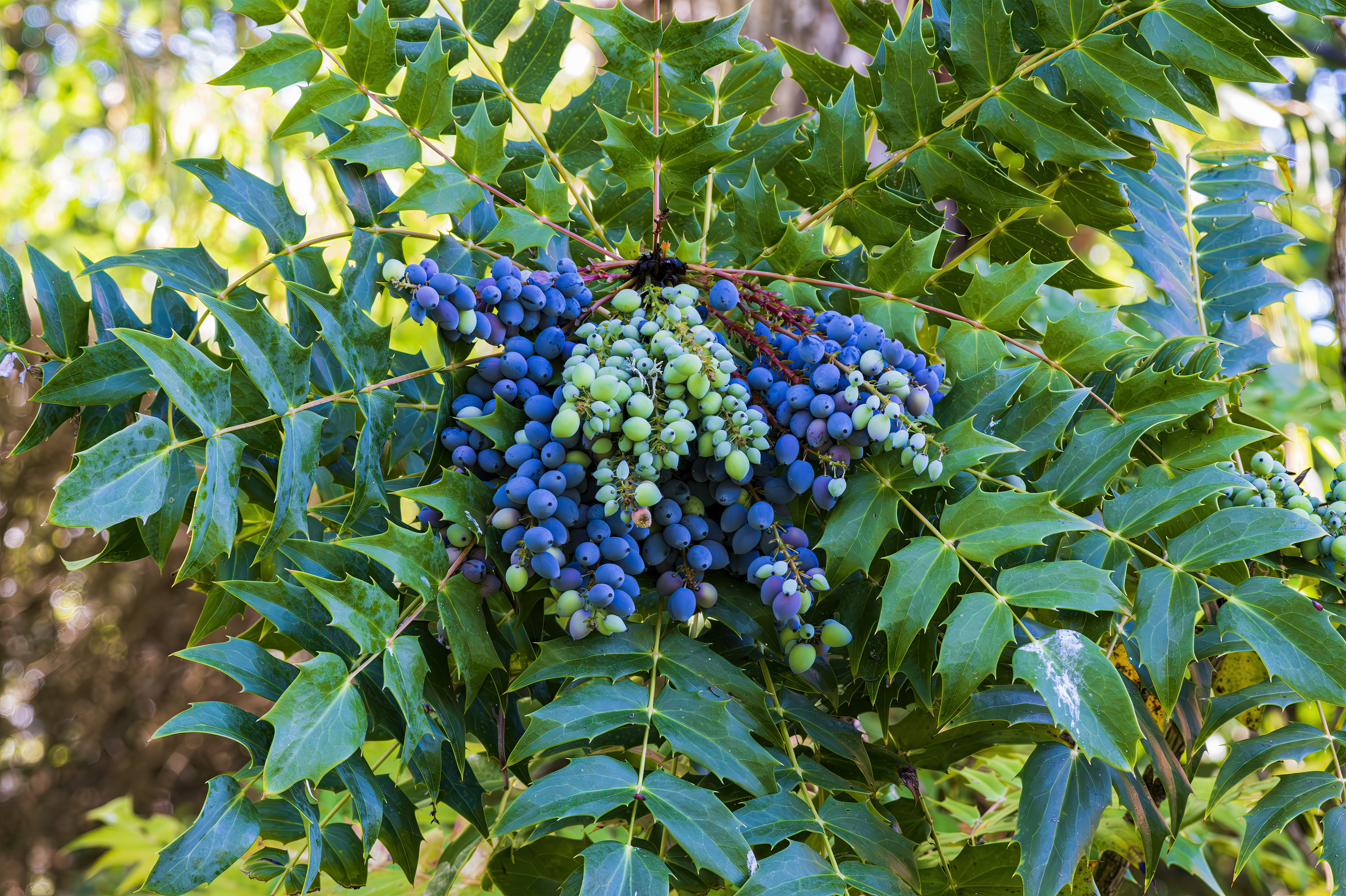
- Berries

Scientific classification
- Kingdom: Plantae
- Clade: Tracheophytes
- Clade: Angiosperms
- Clade: Eudicots
- Order: Ranunculales
- Family: Berberidaceae
- Genus: Berberis
- Species: B. bealei

Binomial name
- Berberis bealei Fortune

Synonyms
- Berberis japonica Lindl.; Berberis magellanica K.Koch; Mahonia bealei (Fortune) Carrière; Mahonia japonica var. bealei (Fortune) Fedde; Mahonia japonica var. planifolia (Hook.f.) H.Lév.

= Berberis bealei =

Species of flowering plants

Berberis bealei, also known as leatherleaf mahonia, Beale's barberry, is a species of evergreen shrub native to mainland China. The species has been regarded as the same species as Berberis japonica, native to Taiwan, but the two differ consistently in certain floral and leaf characters. Both species are widely cultivated in many countries as ornamentals. Berberis bealei has reportedly escaped cultivation and become established in the wild in scattered places in the south-eastern United States from Arkansas to Florida to Delaware.

== Description ==
Berberis bealei is a multi-stemmed, evergreen shrub or small tree with irregular, strong upright stems that have limited branching. It grows up to 8 metres (26 ft) tall, is upright, and is scarcely branching. Leatherleaf mahonia has pinnate compound leave evergreen leaves. The leaves are up to 50 centimetres (20 in) long, with 4–10 pairs of leaflets, plus a much larger terminal leaflet. The sessile leaflets have spines and the terminal leaflets are larger than others.

Flowering occurs in late winter and early spring, when fragrant, lemon-yellow flowers develop. The flowers are borne in an erect raceme up to 30 cm (12 in) long. Showy but weakly foetid, yellow blooms appear in the late winter. Abundant grape-like fruits appear in late summer. The berries emerge by the beginning of winter and are blue or dark purple colored egg-shaped berries, up to 15 millimetres (5/8 in) long, that turn bluish black with a grayish bloom. Fruits hang in grapelike clusters and are glaucous, covered with a white waxy coating. The erect stems are stiff and unbranched.

== Etymology ==
First collected in Anhui, China by Robert Fortune, the plants were taken to Shanghai, where they were planted in the garden of Mr. Beale to await transportation to Europe. Fortune named the species after Beale in an issue of the Gardeners' Chronicle and was sure it was a distinct species, separate from Berberis japonica. Chronicle editor John Lindley was unconvinced and repeatedly referred to the new species as Berberis (Mahonia) japonica. The confusion between B. japonica and B. bealei is reflected in subsequent literature, with the latter referred to variously as B. japonica var. bealei, B. japonica 'Bealei' or B. japonica Bealei Group. Plants labelled as B. bealei with silver undersides to the leaves have been recognized as the cultivar 'Silver Back', though the original Fortune plants lack this silver colouration. As such, 'Silver Back' may represent a different species.

Berberis bealei is one of approximately 70 species that were once classified in genus Mahonia. Thus, older sources refer to this species as Mahonia bealei or M. Japonica.

== Distribution and habitat ==
Berberis bealei is native to China (Anhui, Fujian, Guangdong, Guangxi, Henan, Hubei, Hunan, Jiangsu, Jiangxi, Shaanxi, Sichuan, Zhejiang) and was brought to Europe in the 1800s. It has been planted as an ornamental plant throughout Europe and the United States. Birds eat the seeds of this plant and spread them widely. Berberis bealei is established in the southern U.S. Berberis bealei is particularly common in bottomland forests and grows well in shade to partial shade. It may not flower if it does not receive at least a few hours of sun each day and does not like hot, midday sun in the southern zones. The shrub's ability to tolerate many sites, and the fact that birds disperse the berries, has allowed it to naturalize in parts of the U.S.

== Invasiveness ==
As is the case with many invasive species, B. bealei was introduced intentionally for purpose of landscaping. Berberis bealei needs to be closely monitored as an invasive species. The spiny leaves of B. bealei deter them from being eaten by omnivores such as whitetail deer. Suggested control methods include pulling the seedlings, cutting the mature plants to stumps repeatedly, and using herbicides. Berberis bealei is considered invasive in the Southeastern U.S., specifically Alabama, Georgia, North Carolina, South Carolina, Michigan, and Tennessee.

== Cultivation ==
Berberis bealei is winter hardy to USDA Zones 7–9 where it is easily grown in moist, well-drained soils in part shade (morning sun or sun dappled shade) to full shade. Also tolerates full sun (albeit often with some bleaching of foliage colors), but only in the cooler northern parts of its growing range. Established plants tolerate some soil dryness and drought. Berberis bealei grows in locations protected from exposure to strong winds. Plants will spread by suckering and seed. Unless naturalization is desired, suckers should be promptly removed as they appear. Single specimen shrubs may fruit poorly. Growing more than one shrub together results in the best fruit production. It is easily propagated from cuttings or seed though is considered invasive in the mid-Atlantic and Southeastern U.S.

== Uses ==
Berberis bealei has been used to treat infections such as strep throat and tuberculosis. This plant can also be used to treat bacterial infections such as dysentery and food poisoning. Berberis bealei is also high in tannins and may help muscle pain, arthritis, and aches associated with fever. Fruits are boiled and strained for medicinal preparations. Plants of the genus Berberis have long been used as medicine in China as a treatment for periodontitis, dysentery, tuberculosis and wounds.

Berberis bealei has berries that are used in pies, jellies, jams, beverages and confections. The yellow flowers are eaten or used to make a lemonade-like drink. If these berries are fermented and distilled they can make a wine. Ripe fruit of B. bealei are too acidic to eat raw but can be mixed with sugars or other berries. Young leaves are simmered in water can be eaten. Berberis bealei is not toxic in small amounts, just acidic. The berries can be eaten raw but the seed to pulp ratio is large so most of these berries are boiled and strained.
