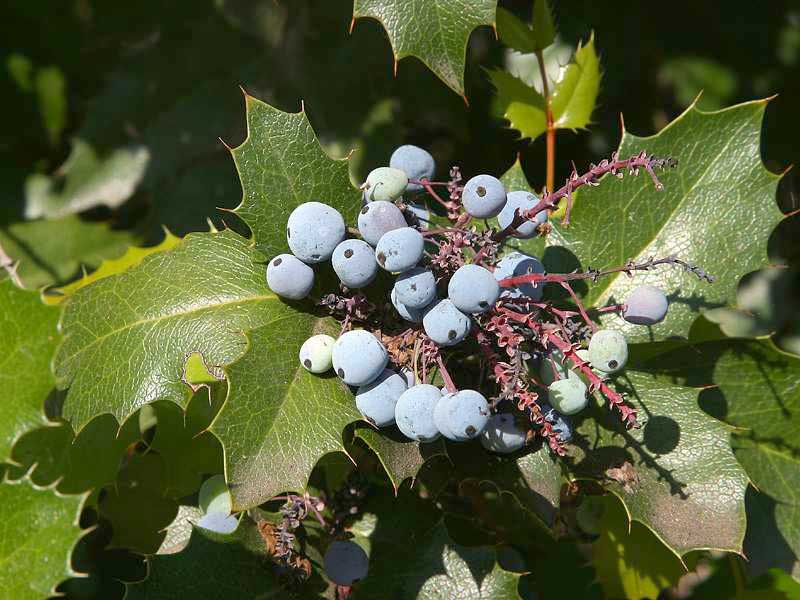
- Mahonia aquifolium fruit

Scientific classification
- Kingdom: Plantae
- Clade: Tracheophytes
- Clade: Angiosperms
- Clade: Eudicots
- Order: Ranunculales
- Family: Berberidaceae
- Genus: Mahonia; Nutt.

Type species
- Mahonia aquifolium

Species
- See List of Berberis and Mahonia species

= Mahonia =

Genus of flowering plants belonging to the barberry family

Mahonia is a formerly accepted genus of approximately 70 species of shrubs or, rarely, small trees with evergreen leaves in the family Berberidaceae, native to eastern Asia, the Himalaya, North America, and Central America. They are closely related to the genus Berberis and as of 2023 the majority of botanical sources list it as a synonym for Berberis.

However, there is still disagreement among botanists, and as recently as 2017 papers have been published arguing for the validity of the genus. In addition, sources that are updated less frequently like the USDA Natural Resources Conservation Service PLANTS database have many plants listed in Mahonia.

Most botanists prefer to classify Mahonia as a part of Berberis because several species in both genera are able to hybridize, and because there are no consistent morphological differences between the two groups other than the leaf pinnation (Berberis sensu stricto appear to have simple leaves, but these are in reality compound with a single leaflet and are termed "unifoliolate"; additionally their branched spines are modified compound leaves). However, recent DNA-based phylogenetic studies retain the two separate genera, by clarifying that unifoliolate-leaved Berberis s.s. is derived from within a paraphyletic group of shrubs bearing imparipinnate evergreen leaves, which are then divided into three genera: Mahonia, Alloberberis (formerly Mahonia section Horridae), and Moranothamnus (formerly Berberis claireae); a broadly-circumscribed Berberis (that is, including Mahonia, Alloberberis, and Moranothamnus) would also be monophyletic.

Mahonia species bear pinnate leaves 10–50 cm (3.9–19.7 in) long with 3 to 15 leaflets, and flowers in racemes which are 5–20 cm (2.0–7.9 in) long. Several species are popular garden shrubs, grown for their ornamental, often spiny, evergreen foliage, yellow (or rarely red) flowers in autumn, winter and early spring, and blue-black berries. The flowers are borne in terminal clusters or spreading racemes, and may be among the earliest flowers to appear in the growing season. The ripened fruits are acidic with a very sharp flavor. The plants contain berberine, a compound found in many Berberis and Mahonia species which in high doses causes vomiting, lowered blood pressure, reduced heart rate, lethargy, and other ill effects when consumed.

The genus name, Mahonia, derives from Bernard McMahon, one of the stewards of the plant collections from the Lewis and Clark Expedition. The type species of the genus is M. aquifolium.

== Species ==
The following list includes all species of the genus Mahonia that were accepted by Tropicos, Missouri Botanical Garden in 2016. For each, binomial name is followed by author citation.

- Mahonia aquifolium (Pursh) Nutt.
- Mahonia bealei (Fortune) Carrière
- Mahonia bodinieri Gagnep.
- Mahonia bracteolata Takeda
- Mahonia breviracema Y.S. Wang & P.G. Xiao
- Mahonia cardiophylla T.S. Ying & Boufford
- Mahonia decipiens C.K. Schneid.
- Mahonia duclouxiana Gagnep.
- Mahonia eurybracteata Fedde
- Mahonia fordii C.K. Schneid.
- Mahonia fortunei (Lindl.) Fedde
- Mahonia fremontii (Torr.) Fedde
- Mahonia gracilipes (Oliv.) Fedde
- Mahonia hancockiana Takeda
- Mahonia imbricata T.S. Ying & Boufford
- Mahonia japonica (Thunb.) DC.
- Mahonia lancasteri Colin
- Mahonia leptodonta Gagnep.
- Mahonia longibracteata Takeda
- Mahonia leschenaultii Wall. Ex. Wight & Arn.
- Mahonia miccia Buch.-Ham. ex D. Don
- Mahonia microphylla T.S. Ying & G.R. Long
- Mahonia monodens J.Y.Wu, H.N.Qin & S.Z.He
- Mahonia monyulensis Ahrendt
- Mahonia moranensis (Schult. & Schult. f.) I.M. Johnstone
- Mahonia napaulensis DC.
- Mahonia nervosa (Pursh) Nutt.
- Mahonia nitens C.K. Schneid.
- Mahonia oiwakensis Hayata
- Mahonia paucijuga C.Y. Wu ex S.Y. Bao
- Mahonia polyodonta Fedde
- Mahonia retinervis P.G. Xiao & Y.S. Wang
- Mahonia setosa Gagnep.
- Mahonia shenii Chun
- Mahonia sheridaniana C.K. Schneid.
- Mahonia subimbricata Chun & F. Chun
- Mahonia taronensis Hand.-Mazz.
- Mahonia tenuifolia (Lindl.) Loudon ex Fedde
- Mahonia tinctoria (Terán & Berland.) I.M. Johnst.
- Mahonia trifoliolata (Moric.) Fedde
- Mahonia volcanica Standl. & Steyerm.

== Diseases ==
Some Mahonia species serve as alternate hosts for the cereal disease stem rust (Puccinia graminis).

== Gallery ==
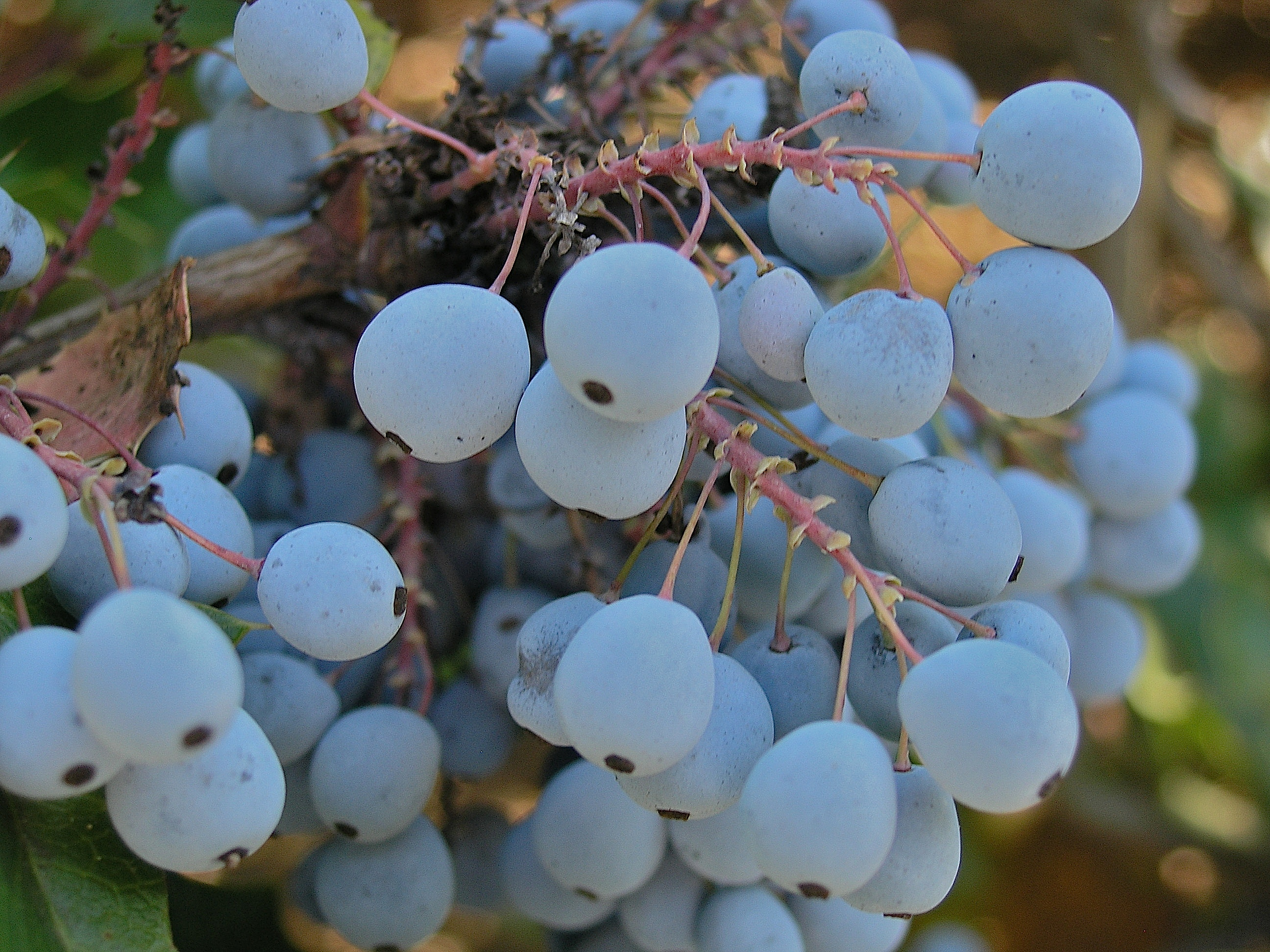
Ripe fruits of Mahonia 'Golden Abundance'

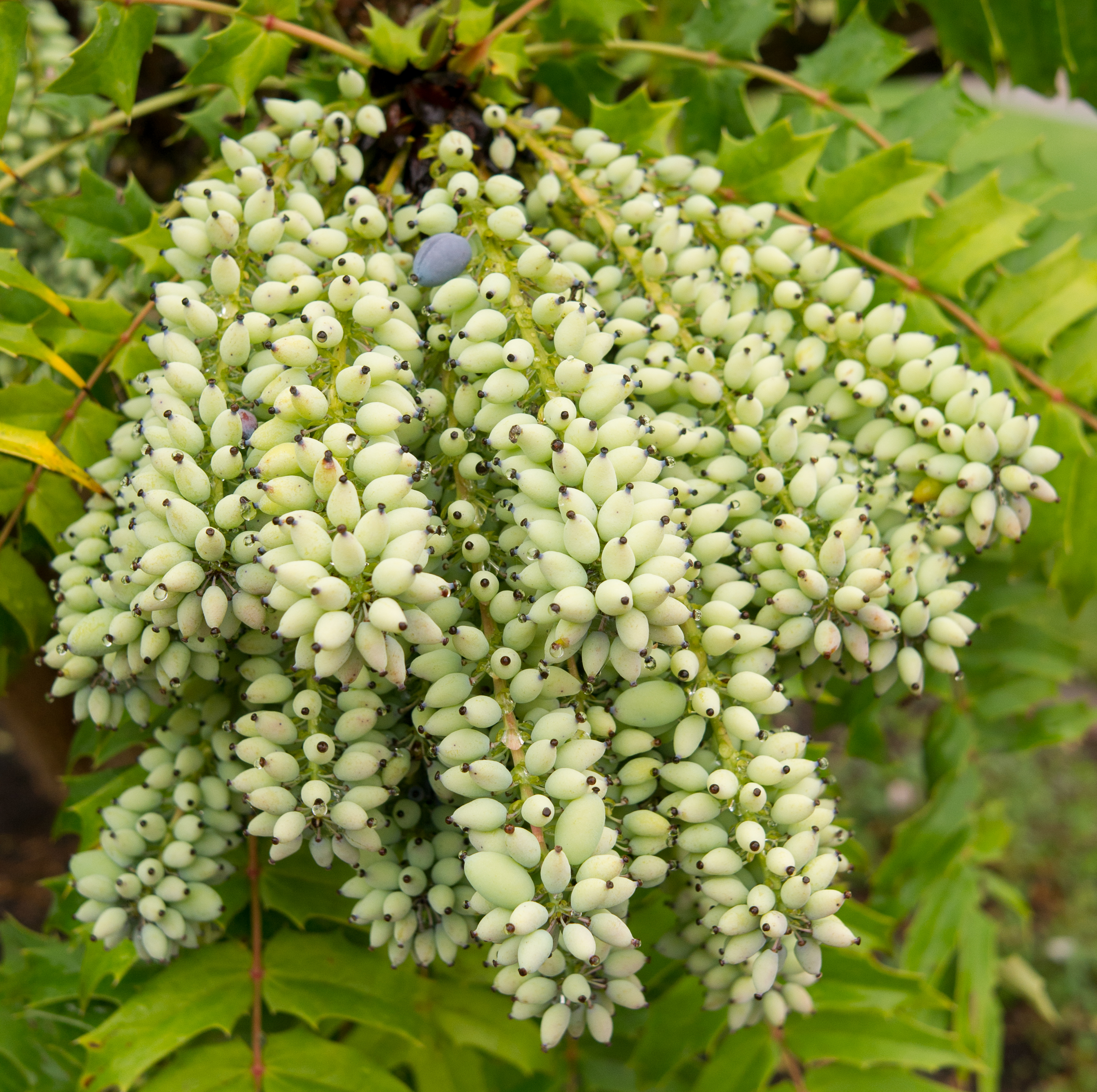
Immature fruits of Mahonia oiwakensis subsp. lomariifolia

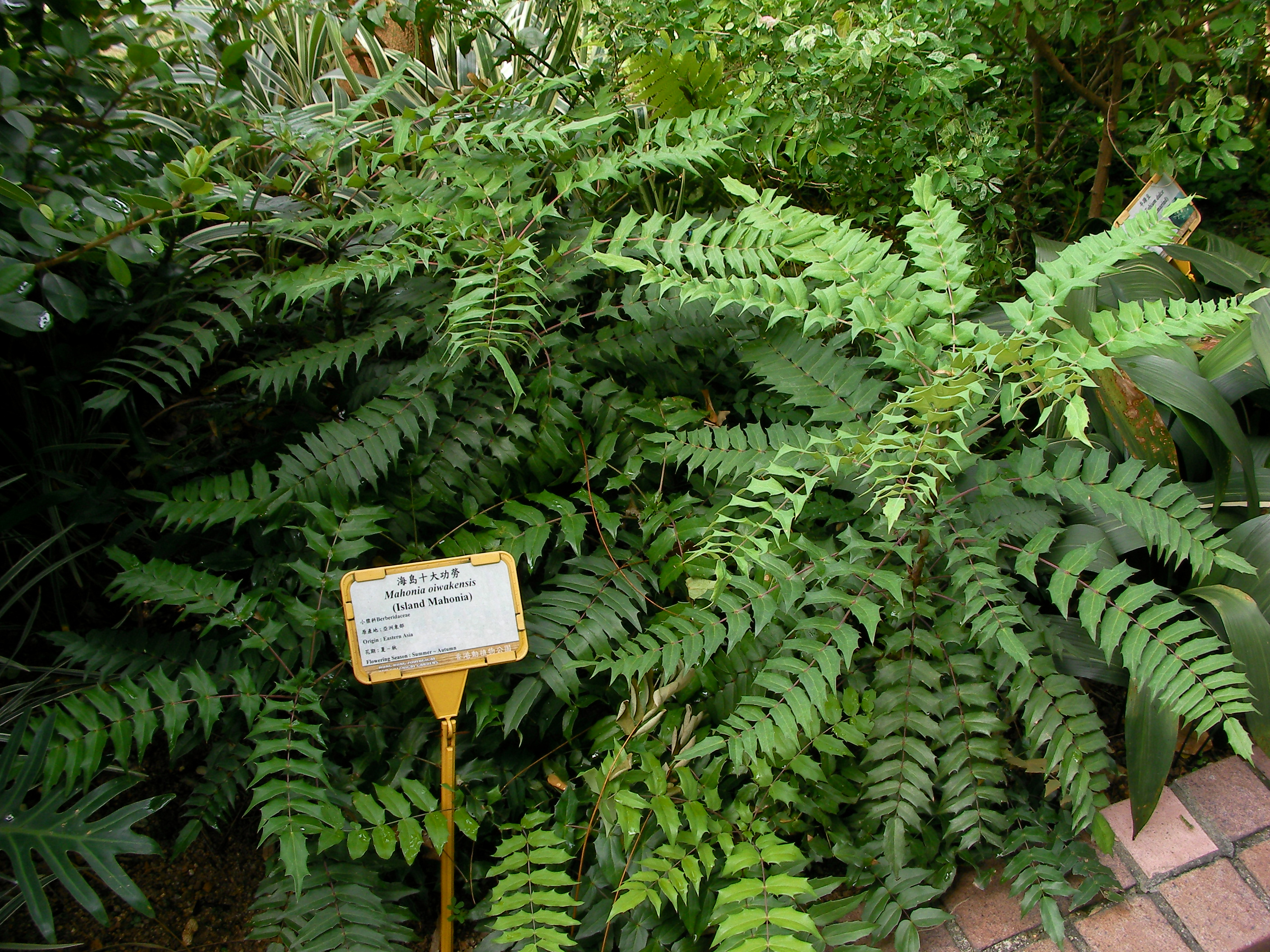
Mahonia oiwakensis at Hong Kong Zoological and Botanical Gardens

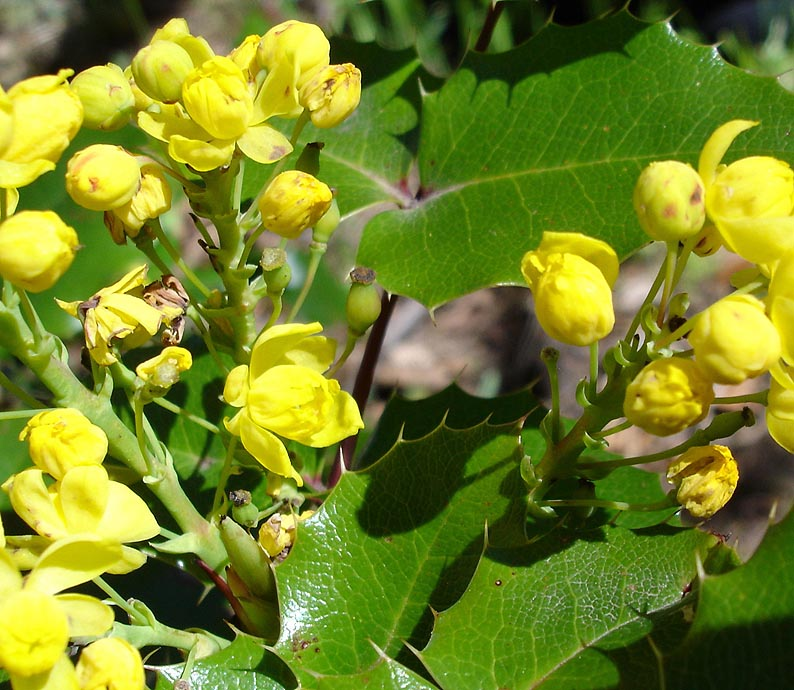
Flowers and buds of Mahonia aquifolium

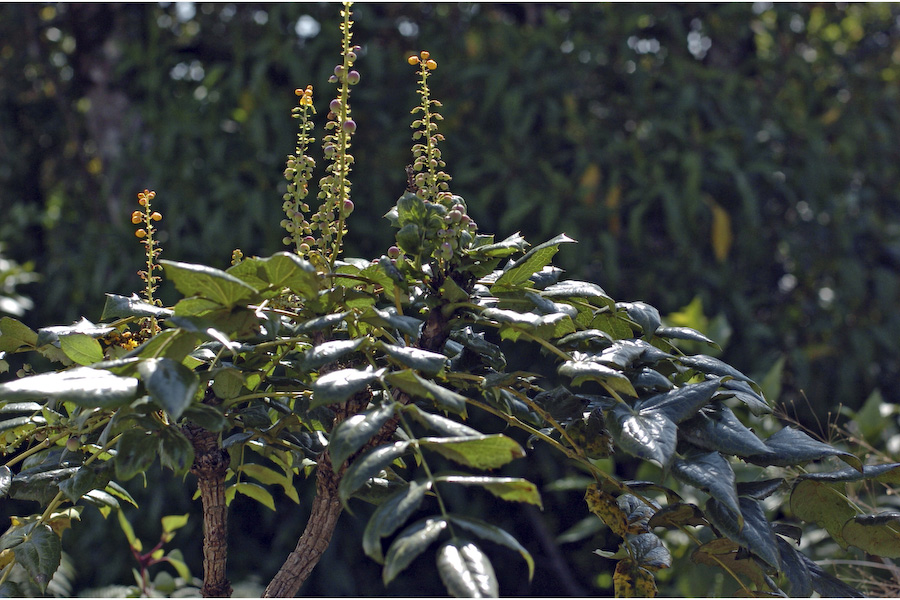
A flowering branch of Mahonia leschenaultii
