= Agua Tibia Wilderness =

Protected wilderness area in California, United States

- IUCN category Ib (wilderness area)
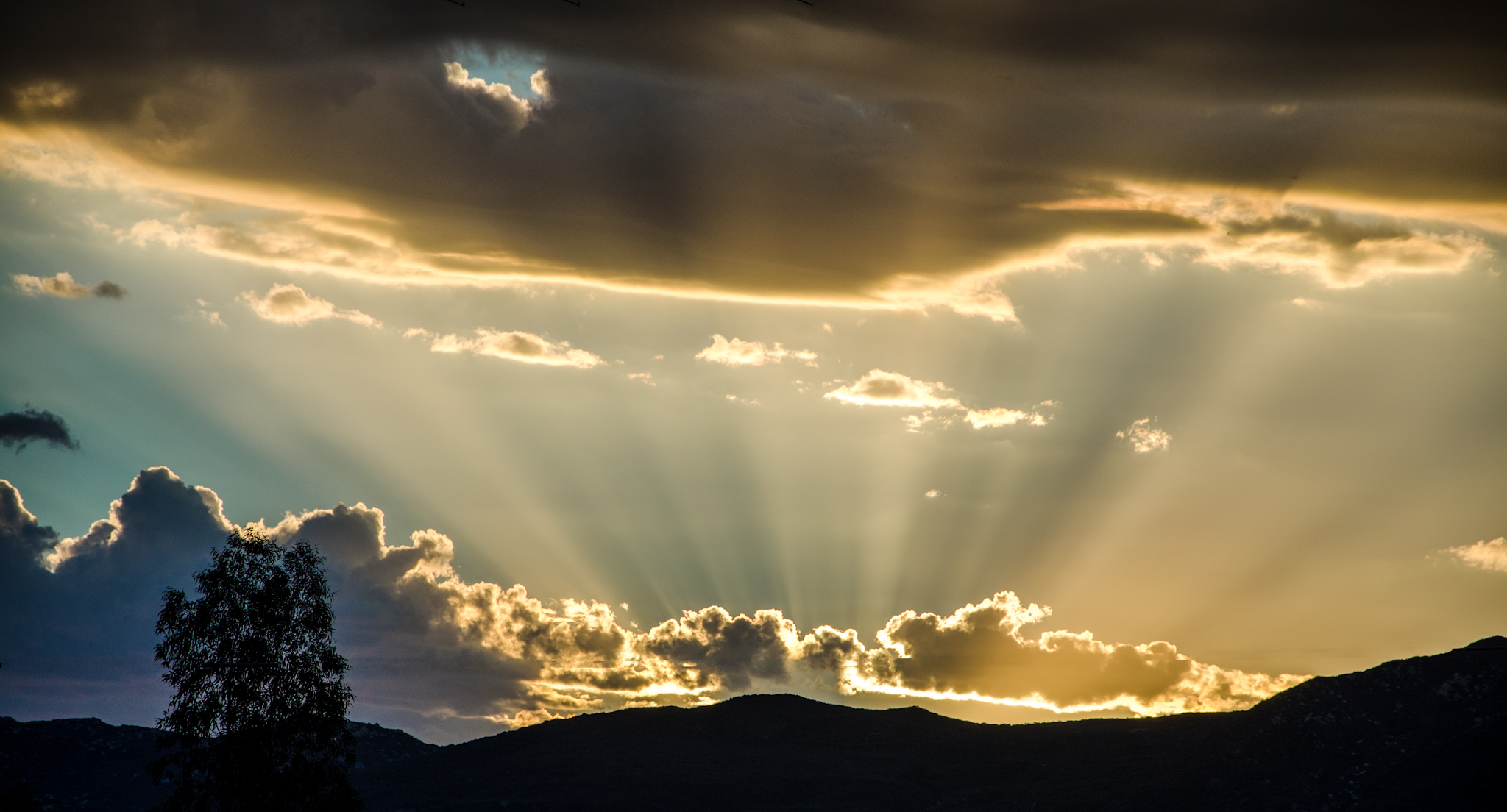
- Sunrise over the Agua Tibia Wilderness

- Location within southern California Location within California Location within the United States
- Interactive map of Agua Tibia Wilderness
- Location: San Diego and Riverside counties, California, United States
- Nearest city: Temecula, California
- Coordinates: 33.4208650°N 116.9858598°W
- Area: 17,961 acres (72.69 km^{2})
- Established: January 5, 1975
- Governing body: U.S. Forest Service, USDA; Bureau of Land Management

Agua Tibia Wilderness (ATW) is a 17,961-acre (72.69 km^{2}) protected area in Riverside and San Diego counties, in the U.S. state of California. It is mostly within the Palomar Ranger District of the Cleveland National Forest. The area was originally protected as the Agua Tibia Primitive Area until January 1975 when it was added to the National Wilderness Preservation System with the passage of Public Law 93-632 by the United States Congress. Between its inception and 1984, the ATW was San Diego County's only officially designated wilderness area. The Spanish name, Agua Tibia, translates as warm water.

Its approximate boundaries are:

- North – SR 79
- East – Arroyo Seco River
- South – Fray Creek
- West – Pala Road

== Environment ==
There are no permanent streams in the ATW. The highest landform is Agua Tibia Mountain with an elevation of 4,779 feet (1,457 m).

Though the summer climate is hot, with limited shade and no water sources, there were no fires in the ATW for 110 years. In the last two decades, there have been four fires including the Palomar Mountain Fire (1987), the Vail Fire (1989), the Agua Tibia Fire (2000), and the Poomacha Fire (2007). Its pollution exposure is monitored within the San Diego Air Basin.

== Flora ==
The Agua Tibia Wilderness is home to rare and endemic plants. These include:

- Nevin's barberry (Berberis nevinii)
- Rainbow manzanita (Arctostaphylos rainbowensis)
- Vail Lake ceanothus (Ceanothus ophiochilus)

== Agua Tibia Research Natural Area ==
The Agua Tibia Research Natural Area (ATRNA), located within the wilderness, comprises 480 acres (190 ha) of bigcone Douglas-fir—canyon live oak forest. The area was set aside for the study of this forest type in the Peninsular Range province and with emphasis on forest succession, long-range ecological changes and the effects of resource management practices. Bigcone Douglas-fir (Pseudotsuga macrocarpa) is a relict species and is endemic to Southern California. This population on the ATRNA is unique for its relatively great age, size, genetic purity, placement near the southern extent of the species' range, and for its remoteness and lack of disturbance by man. Other notable plants in the research area are Laguna linanthus (Linanthus orcuttii ssp. pacificus) and Hall's monardella (Monardella macrantha ssp. hallii). Both are listed as 1B by the California Native Plant Society's Rare Plant Program.

== Springs ==
According to a U.S. government geologist writing in 1915, "Near the southern base of Agua Tibia Mountain and 25 miles in a direct line north of west from Warner Hot Springs, warm water (agua tibia), issues along a fault zone that is parallel to the one in Warner Valley. The water rises with a temperature of 92 °F (33 °C) in a marshy area that covers perhaps an acre. It is conducted from a board-curbed pool to tubs in a near-by house, for bathing and laundry use. Bubbles continually rise in the pool and the water is distinctly sulphureted...This water is essentially primary saline in character, being a soft water of moderate mineralization."
