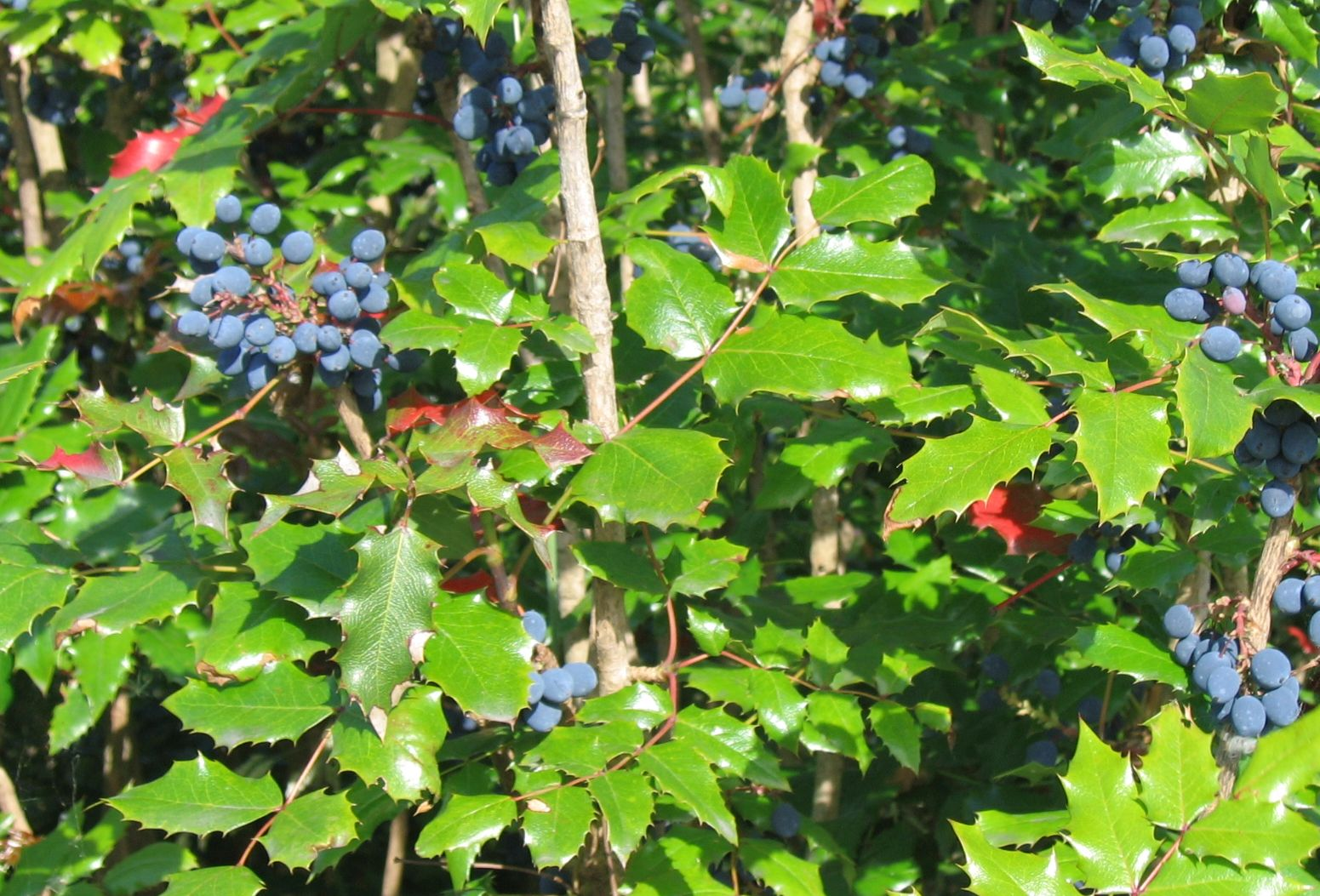

Scientific classification
- Kingdom: Plantae
- Clade: Tracheophytes
- Clade: Angiosperms
- Clade: Eudicots
- Order: Ranunculales
- Family: Berberidaceae
- Genus: Berberis
- Species: B. aquifolium

Binomial name
- Berberis aquifolium Pursh

Synonyms
- List: Berberis brevipes Greene; Berberis pinnata Banks ex DC.; Mahonia aquifolium (Pursh) Nutt.; Mahonia brevipes (Greene) Rehder; Mahonia diversifolia Sweet; Mahonia latifolia Dippel; Mahonia moseri Ahrendt; Mahonia moseriana Moser; Mahonia murrayana Dippel; Mahonia undulata Ahrendt; Odostemon aquifolius (Pursh) Rydb.; Odostemon brevipes (Greene) A.Heller; Odostemon nutkanus (DC.) Rydb.

= Berberis aquifolium =

Species of flowering plant

Berberis aquifolium, the Oregon grape, holly-leaved barberry, or Mahonia, is a North American species of flowering plant in the family Berberidaceae. It is an evergreen shrub growing up to 3 metres (10 ft) tall and 1.5 m (5 ft) wide. It has pinnate leaves consisting of spiny leaflets, exhibiting dense clusters of yellow flowers in early spring, followed by dark bluish-black berries.

The berries are a part of the traditional diet of some indigenous peoples of the Pacific Northwest and the species serves as the state flower of Oregon.

== Taxonomy ==
Some botanists continue to place part of the barberry genus Berberis in a separate genus, Mahonia. Under this classification Berberis aquifolium is named Mahonia aquifolium. As of 2023 Plants of the World Online classifies it as Berberis aquifolium with no valid subspecies.

Berberis dictyota is sometimes considered a variety of B. aquifolium, but is presently accepted by most authorities.

=== Etymology ===
The Latin specific epithet aquifolium denotes "sharp-leafed" (as in Ilex aquifolium, the common holly), referring to the spiny foliage.

Berberis aquifolium is not closely related to either the true holly (Ilex aquifolium) or the true grape (Vitis), but its common name, Oregon-grape holly comes from its resemblance to these plants.

== Distribution and habitat ==
Berberis aquifolium is a native plant in the North American West from Southeast Alaska to Northern California to central New Mexico, often occurring in the understory of Douglas-fir forests (although other forest types contain the species) and in brushlands in the Cascades, Rockies, and northern Sierra Nevada. Berberis aquifolium is invasive in parts of Western Europe, having escaped cultivation in parks. It's expansion is likely linked to global warming.

== Description ==
Berberis aquifolium grows to 1–3 metres (3 1/2–10 feet) tall and 1.5 m (5 ft) wide. The stems and twigs have a thickened, corky appearance. The leaves are pinnate and up to 30 centimetres (12 inches) long, comprising 5–9 ovate, spiny leaflets up to 7.5 cm (3 in) long. Shiny on top, the leathery leaves resemble those of holly.

From March to June, the yellow flowers are borne in dense clusters 3–6 cm (1 1/4–2 1/4 in) long and 1.5 cm (5/8 in) wide. Each of the six stamens terminates in two spreading branches. The six yellow petals are enclosed by six yellow sepals. At the base of the flower are three greenish-yellow bracts, less than half as long as the sepals. The spherical berries are up to 1 cm (3/8 in) wide, dark dusty-blue, and tart in taste.

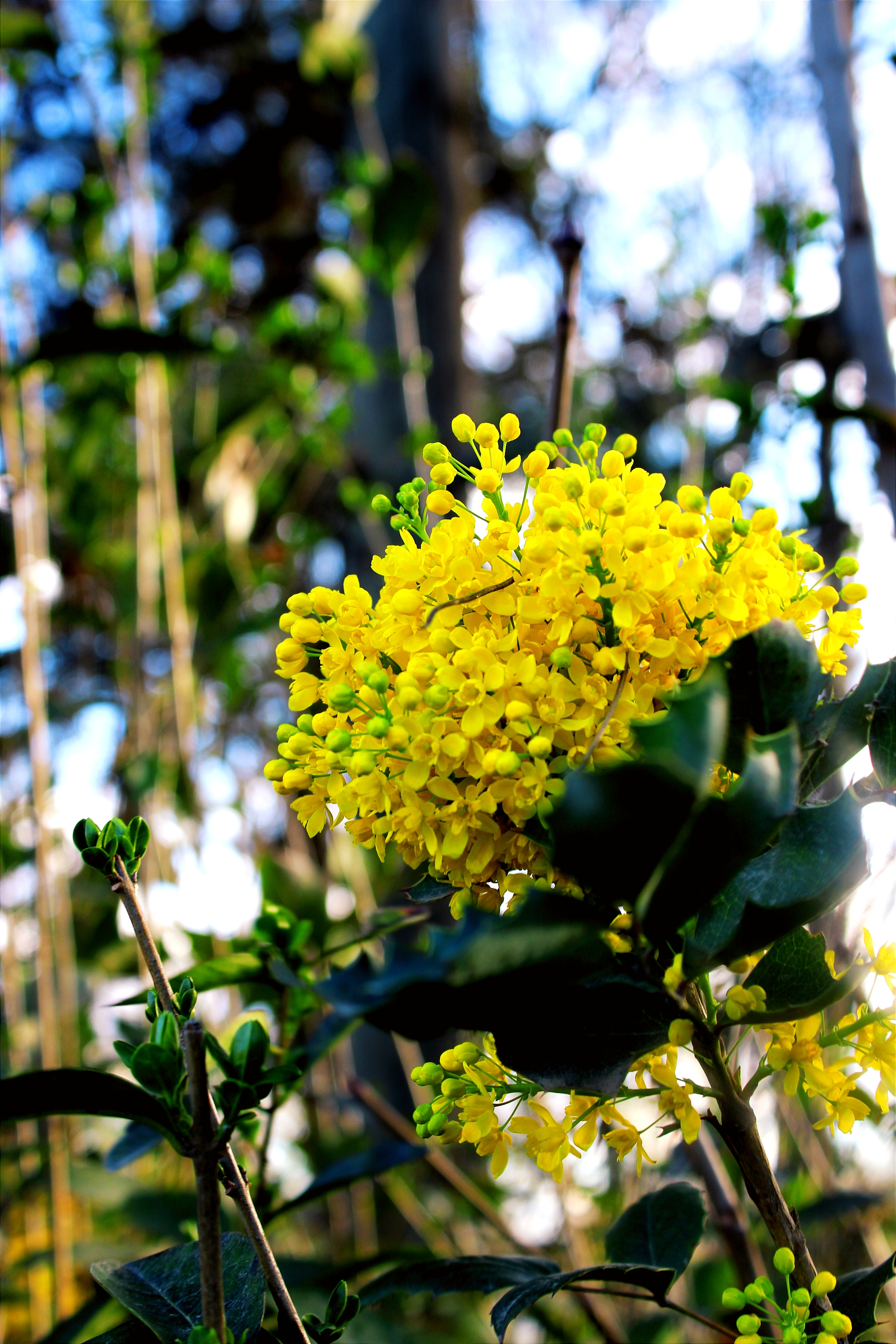
Flowers

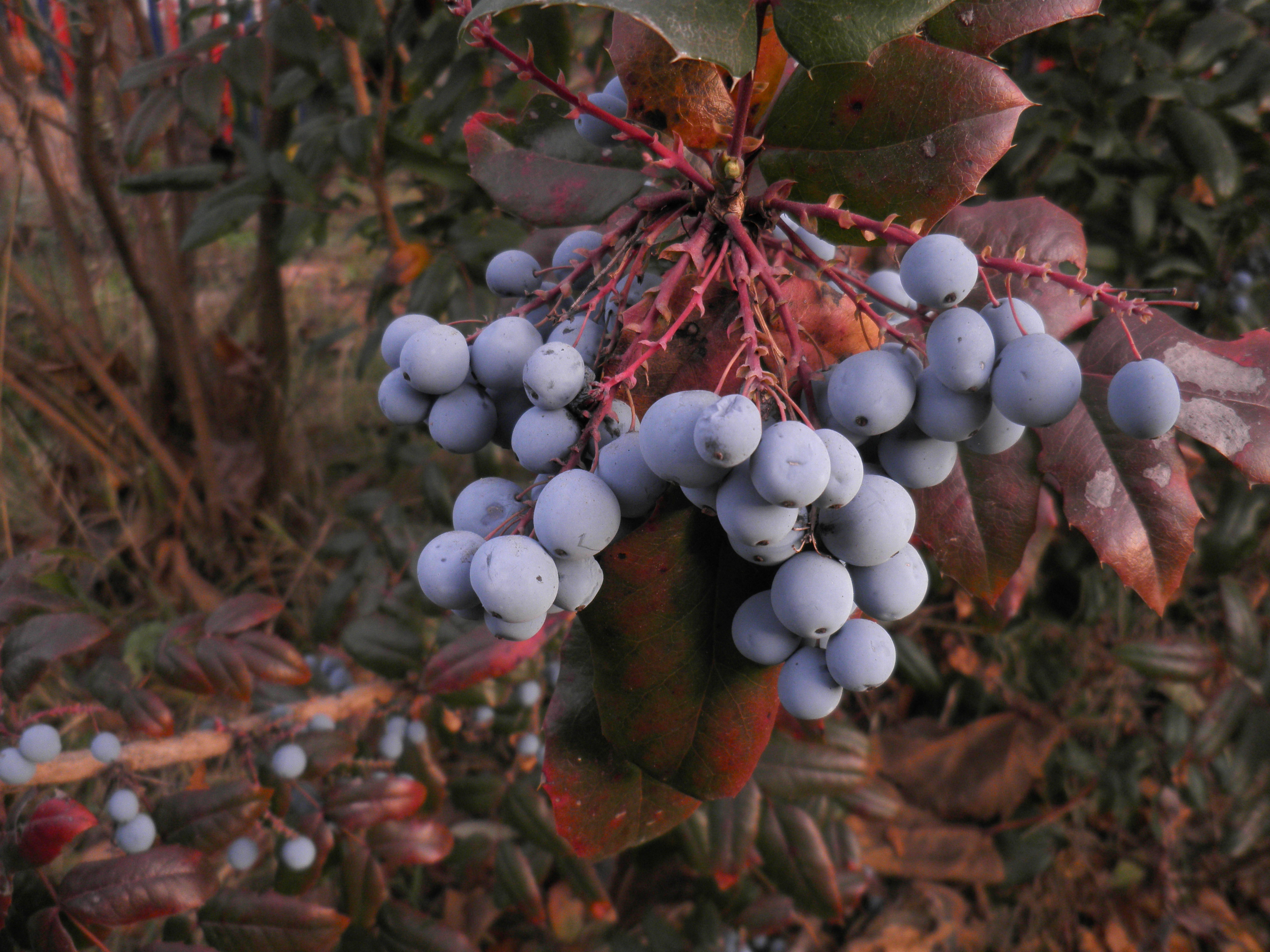
Fruit clusters

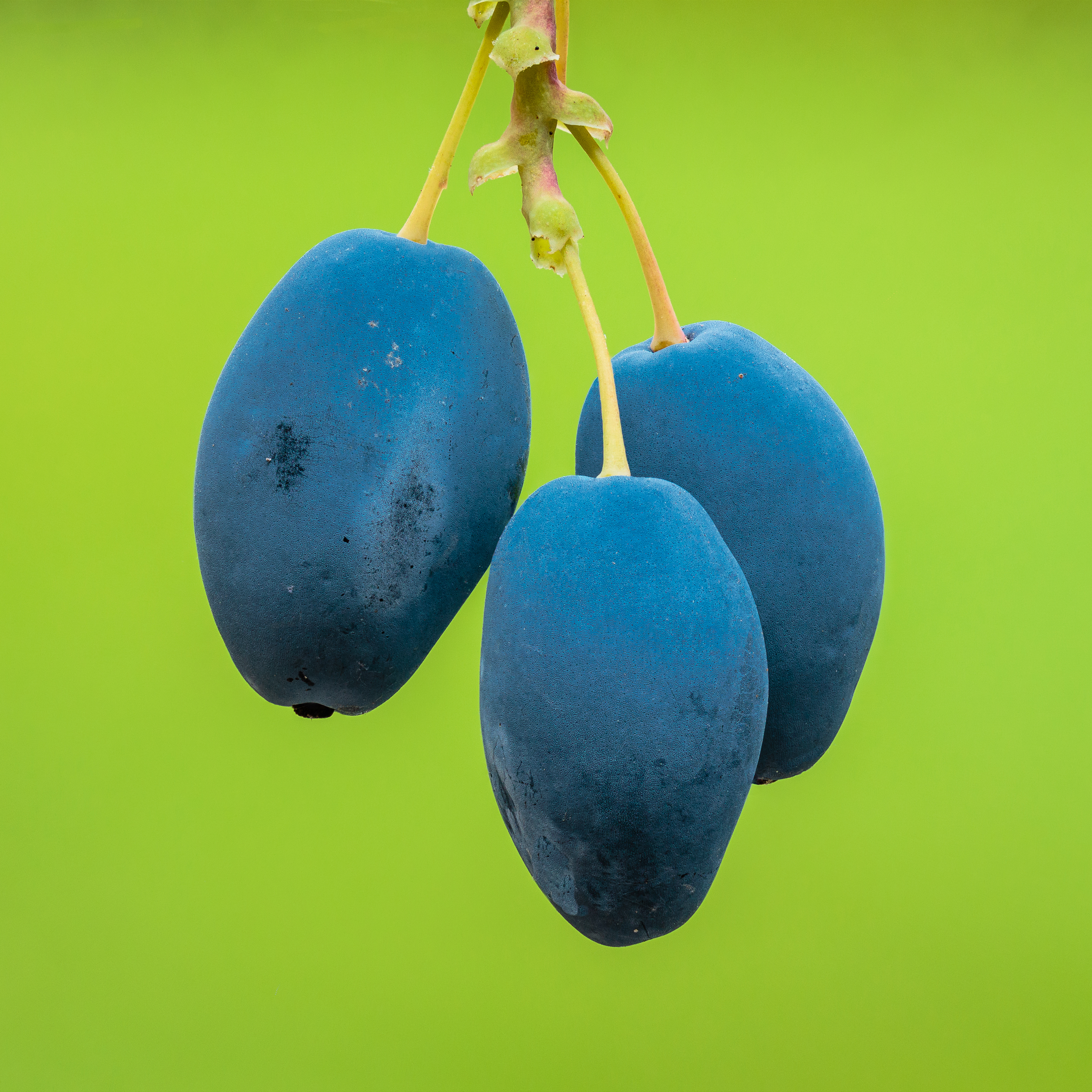
Close-up of fruits

=== Chemistry ===
Berberis aquifolium contains 5'-methoxyhydnocarpin (5'-MHC), a multidrug resistance pump inhibitor, which works to decrease bacterial resistance in vitro.

=== Similar species ===
Berberis nervosa (Cascade Oregon grape) is similar but has 7–23 leaflets.

== Ecology ==
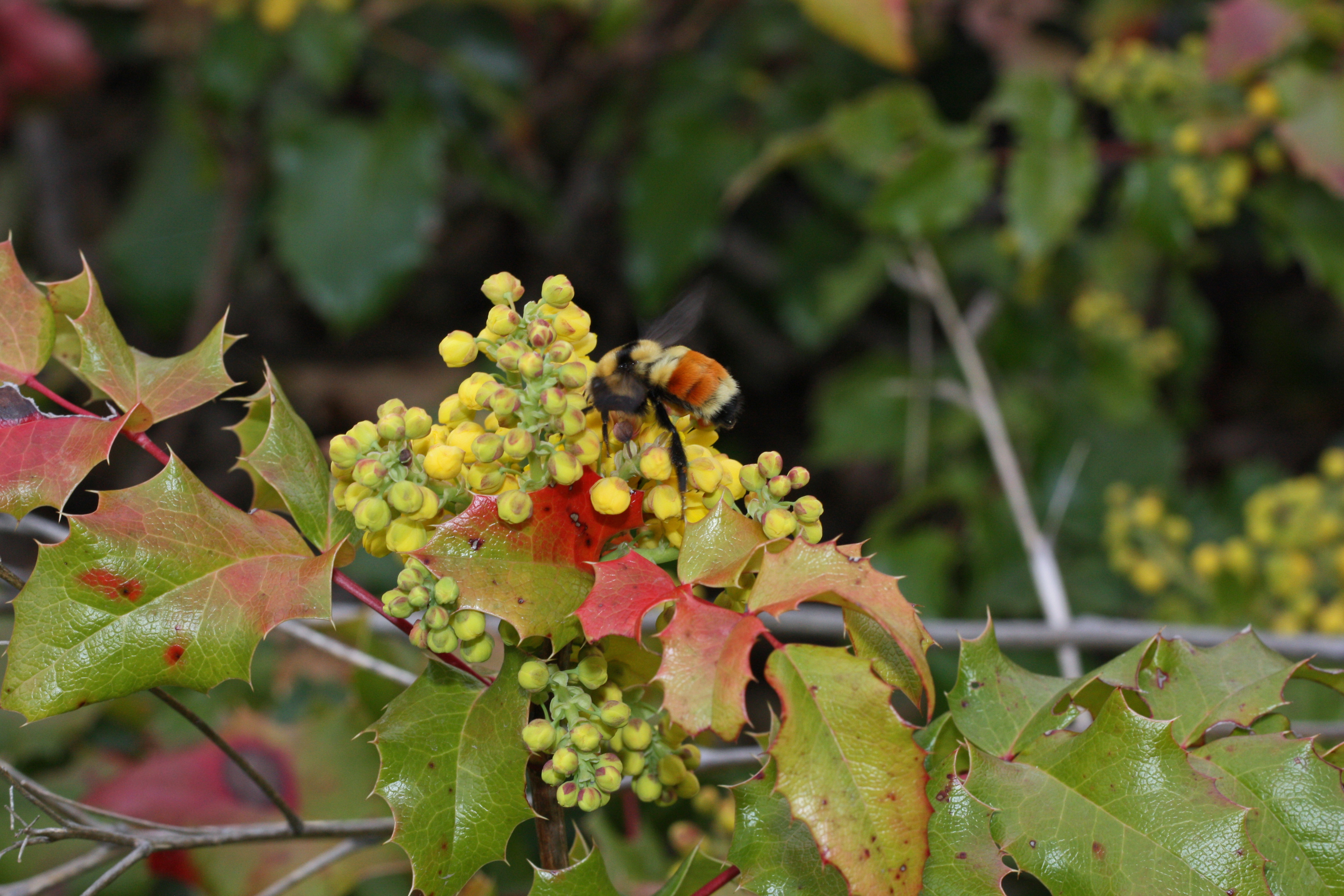
Flowers visited by a bumblebee

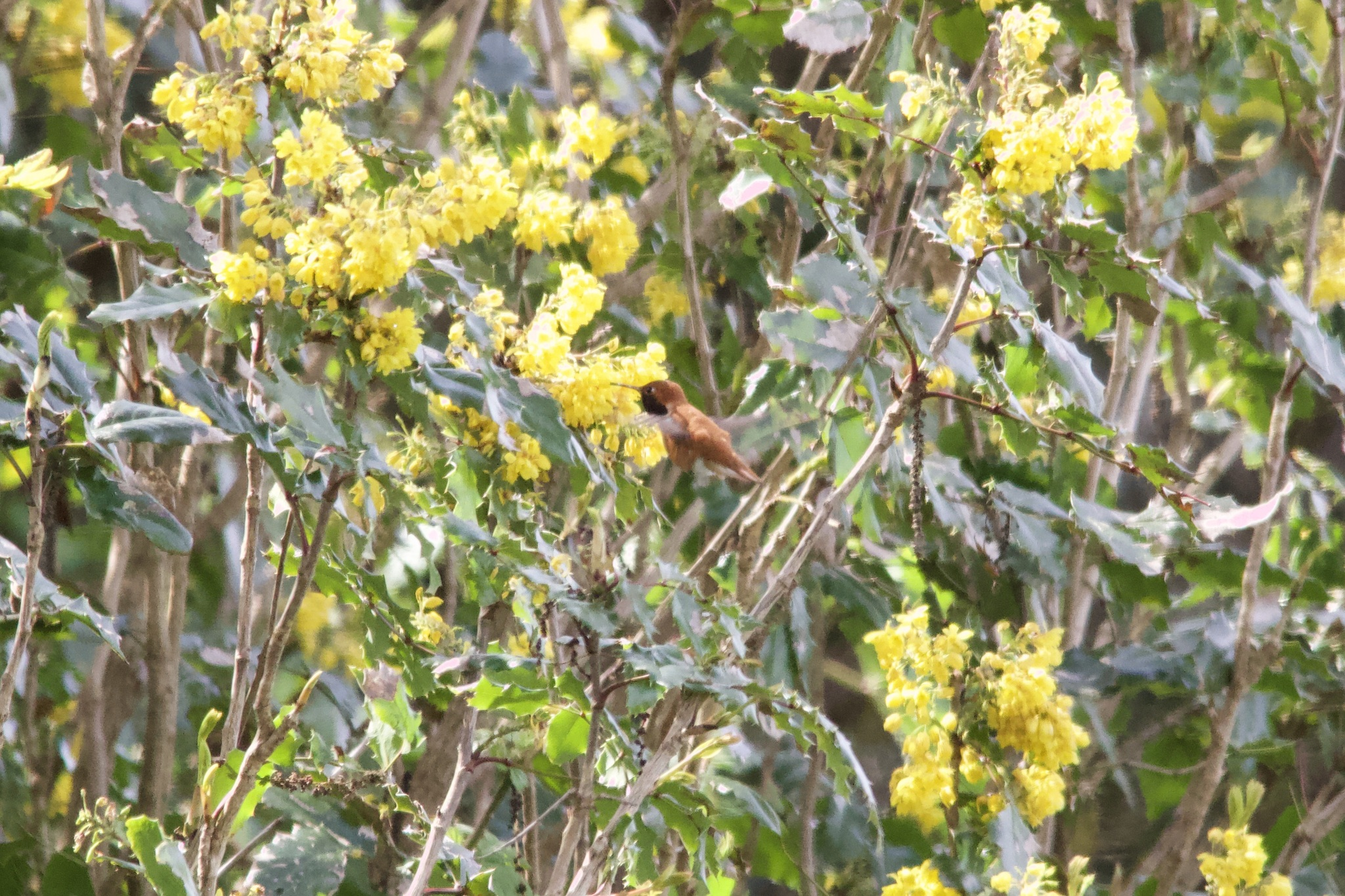
Rufous hummingbird visiting Oregon grape blossoms, in British Columbia

As with some other Berberis, B. aquifolium can serve as an alternate host for wheat yellow rust (Puccinia striiformis f. sp. tritici, which usually prefers wheat), but it is unknown whether this occurs naturally.

Wildlife consume the berries.

== Cultivation ==
Berberis aquifolium is a popular subject in shady or woodland plantings. It is valued for its striking foliage and flowers, which often appear before those of other shrubs. It is resistant to summer drought, tolerates poor soils, and does not create excessive leaf litter. Its berries attract birds.

Numerous cultivars and hybrids have been developed, of which the following have gained the Royal Horticultural Society's Award of Garden Merit:

- M. × wagneri 'Pinnacle' (B. aquifolium × Berberis pinnata)
- 'Apollo'

== Uses ==
The small purplish-black fruits, which are quite tart and contain large seeds, are edible raw after the season's first frosts. They were included in small quantities in the traditional diets of Pacific Northwest tribes, mixed with salal or another sweeter fruit. Today, they are sometimes used to make jelly, alone or mixed with salal. Oregon-grape juice can be fermented to make wine, similar to European barberry wine folk traditions, although it requires an unusually high amount of sugar.

The inner bark of the larger stems and roots of Oregon grape yield a yellow dye. The berries contain a dye that can be purple, blue, pink, or green depending on the pH of water used to make the dye, due to the berries containing a naturally occurring pH indicator.

=== Medicinal uses ===
Some indigenous peoples of the Northwest Plateau use Oregon grape for indigestion.

The plant contains berberine and reportedly has antimicrobial properties similar to those of goldenseal.

== In culture ==
In 1899, Oregon-grape was recognized as the state flower of Oregon.
