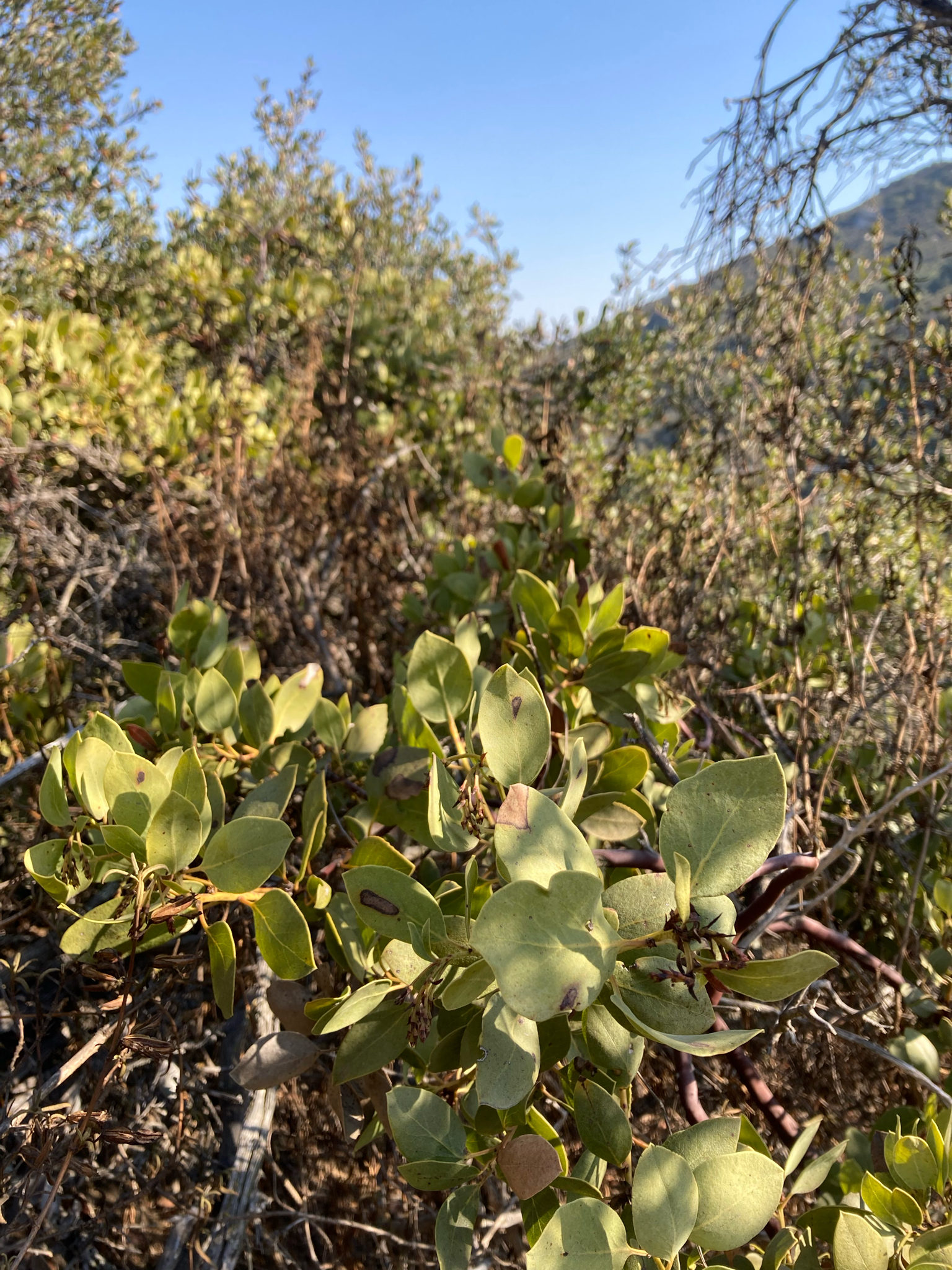
- Growing in the southern Santa Ana mountains

Conservation status
- Apparently Secure (NatureServe)

Scientific classification
- Kingdom: Plantae
- Clade: Tracheophytes
- Clade: Angiosperms
- Clade: Eudicots
- Clade: Asterids
- Order: Ericales
- Family: Ericaceae
- Genus: Arctostaphylos
- Species: A. rainbowensis

Binomial name
- Arctostaphylos rainbowensis J.E.Keeley & A.Massihi

= Arctostaphylos rainbowensis =

Species of tree

Arctostaphylos rainbowensis is a species of manzanita known by the common name Rainbow manzanita. It is endemic to California, where it is known only from northern San Diego and southern Riverside Counties in the Peninsular Ranges.

It was named for the community of Rainbow, California, near where it is most common in the chaparral of the lower elevation coastal Santa Ana Mountains, and the only manzanita species throughout most of its range.

== Taxonomy ==
A specimen was first collected in 1973 and considered to be part of a disjunct population of Arctostaphylos peninsularis, or alternately a hybrid between Arctostaphylos glauca and Arctostaphylos glandulosa. Following phenetic analyses both possibilities were discarded and the plant was described as a new species in 1994.

== Description ==
Arctostaphylos rainbowensis is an erect shrub reaching a bush-like 1 metre (3.3 ft) to a tree-like 4 metres (13 ft) in height. It produces a burl at its base and is coated in reddish brown, smooth bark.

The oval leaves are up to 5 centimeters long and 3.5 wide and are hairless and somewhat waxy in texture. The inflorescence is a hanging cluster of white urn-shaped flowers each about 6 to 8 millimeters long. The fruit is about a centimeter wide and ripens to a dark purple-brown.

Extirpation

Since the species was first collected its habitat has undergone extensive development, leading to the extirpation of many of its populations.

Identification

In some areas, Arctostaphylos rainbowensis overlaps in range with the much more widespread Arctostaphylos glandulosa. The rarer rainbowensis has no hairs of the stems, new growth, and inflorescence, unlike glandulosa.

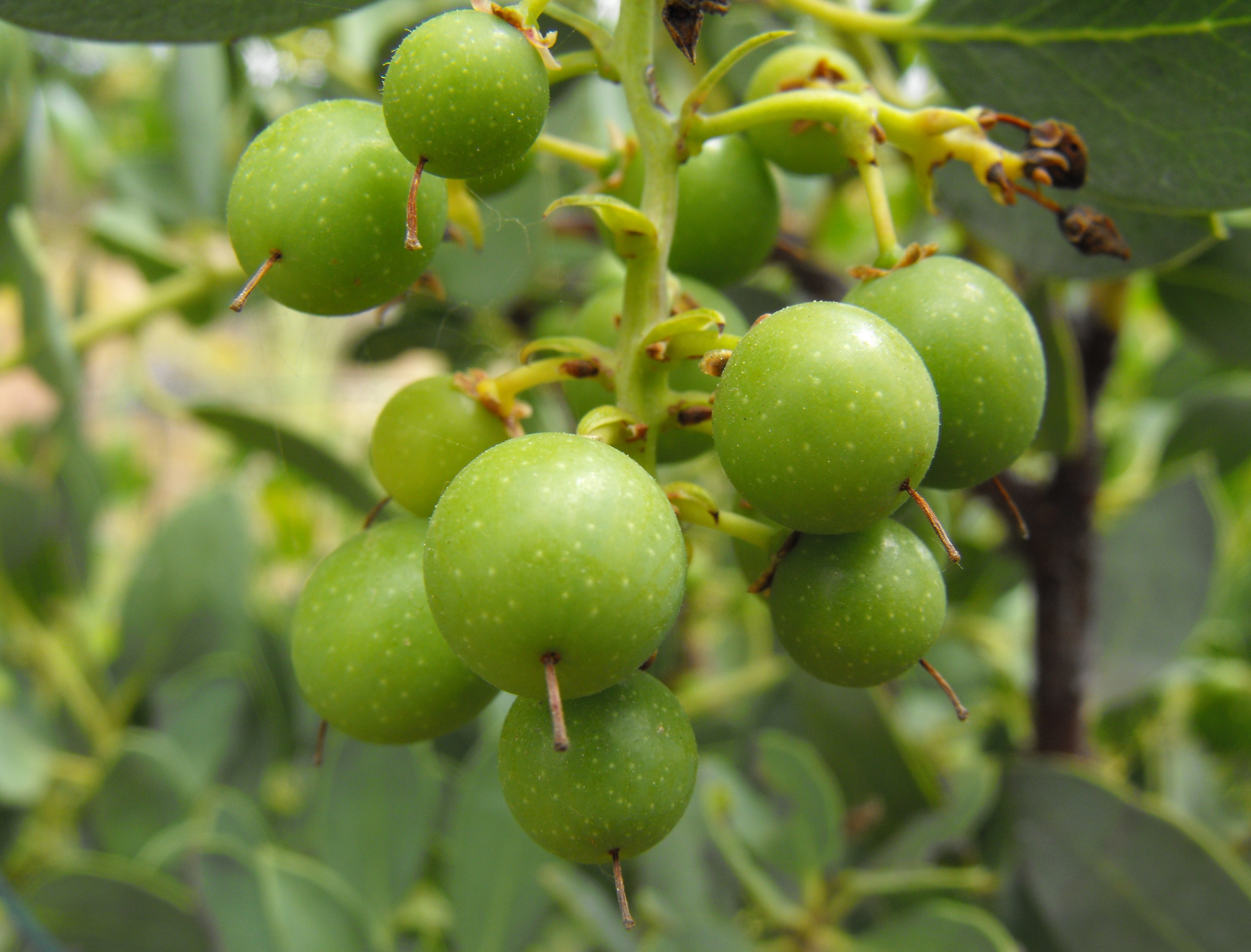
Cultivated individual

== See also ==
- California chaparral and woodlands — ecoregion.
  - California coastal sage and chaparral — subregion.
  - California montane chaparral and woodlands — subregion.
