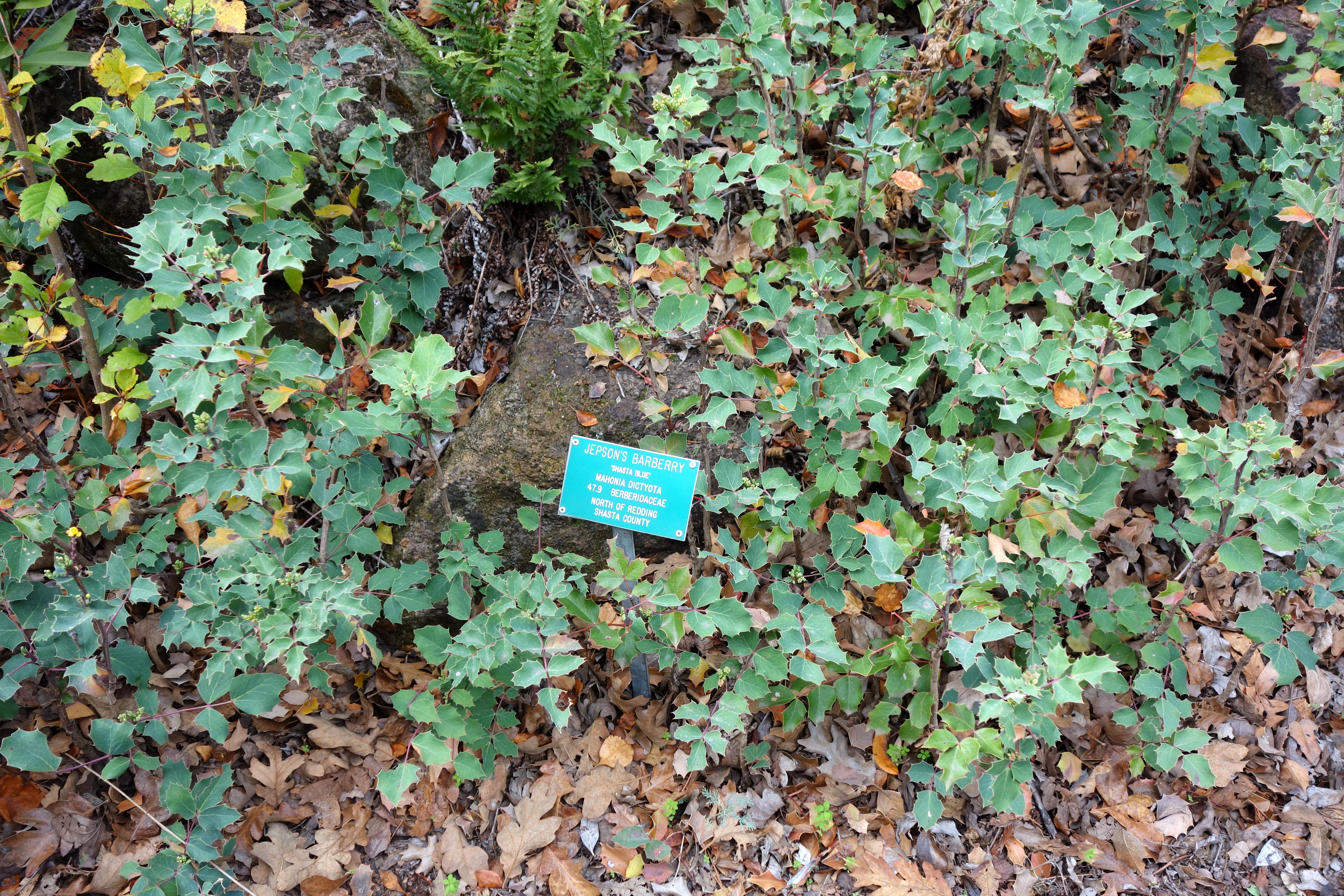
- Regional Parks Botanic Garden, Berkeley Hills.

Conservation status
- Apparently Secure (NatureServe)

Scientific classification
- Kingdom: Plantae
- Clade: Tracheophytes
- Clade: Angiosperms
- Clade: Eudicots
- Order: Ranunculales
- Family: Berberidaceae
- Genus: Berberis
- Species: B. dictyota

Binomial name
- Berberis dictyota Jeps.

Synonyms
- Berberis aquifolium var. dictyota (Jeps.) Jeps.; Berberis californica Jeps; Mahonia dictyota (Jeps.) Fedde; Mahonia californica (Jeps.) Ahrendt; Odostemon dictyota (Jeps.) Abrams

= Berberis dictyota =

Species of shrub

Berberis dictyota, now reclassified as Berberis aquifolium var. dictyota, with the common names Jepson's oregon grape and shining netvein barberry, is a flowering plant in the Barberry family.

== Description ==
Berberis dictyota is an evergreen shrub up to 2 metres (6 ft 7 in) tall. Leaves are pinnate, with 5-7 leaflets; leaflets thick and rigid, whitish with a thick waxy layer on the underside, up to 9 cm long, with spines along the edges.

Yellow flowers are borne in dense racemes of up to 50 flowers. The bloom period is February through April.

Berries are egg-shaped, dark blue, sometimes with a waxy coating, up to 7 mm long.

== Distribution and habitat ==
The plant is endemic to California. It is very widespread, found from the Peninsular Ranges in San Diego County north to the Klamath Mountains in Siskiyou County, and east to the Sierra Nevada.

It is native to chaparral, Foothill oak woodland, and yellow pine forest habitats, at elevations of 600–1,800 metres (2,000–5,900 ft).

== See also ==
- Endemic flora of California
- Flora of the California chaparral and woodlands
