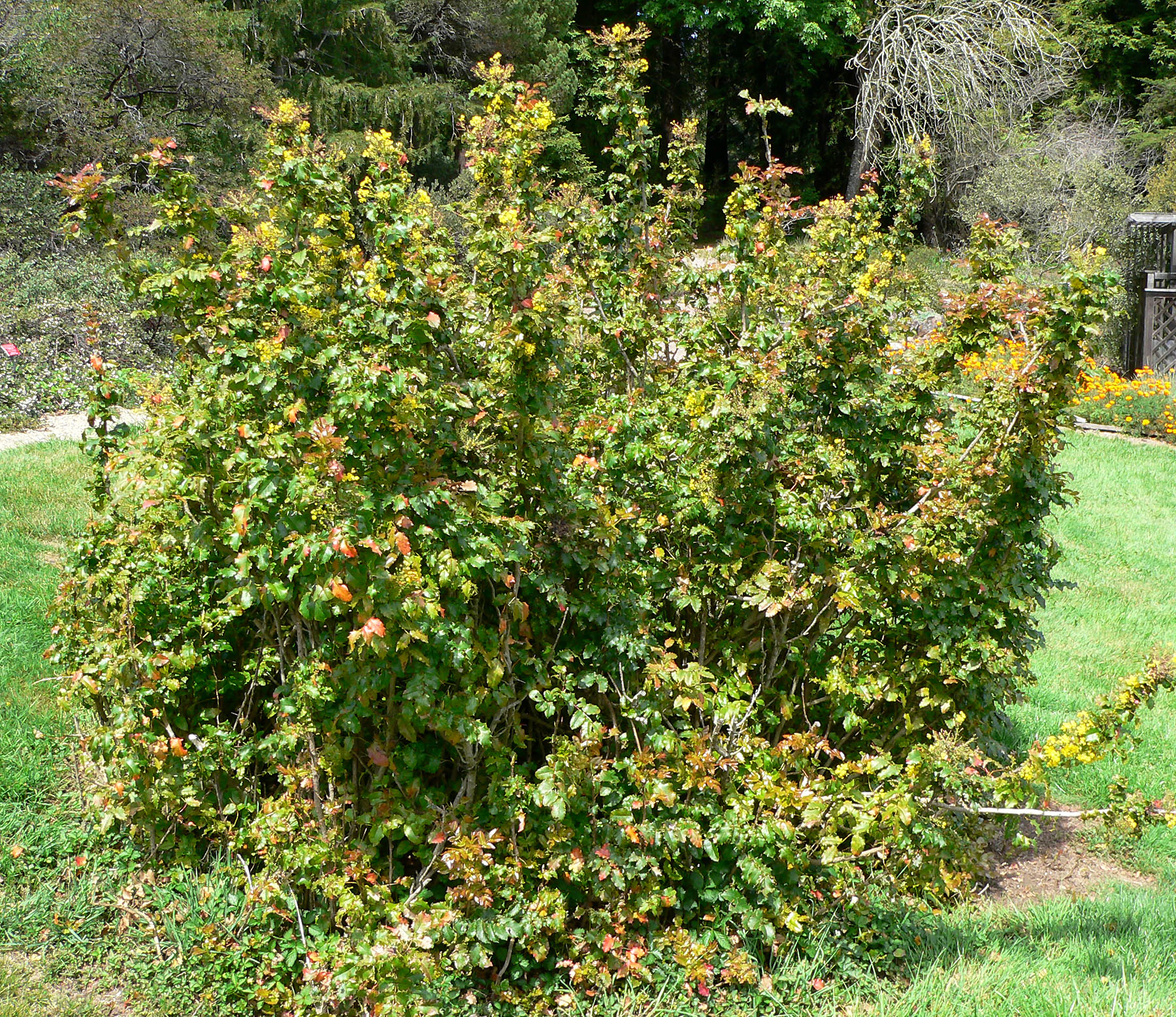

Scientific classification
- Kingdom: Plantae
- Clade: Tracheophytes
- Clade: Angiosperms
- Clade: Eudicots
- Order: Ranunculales
- Family: Berberidaceae
- Genus: Berberis
- Species: B. pinnata

Binomial name
- Berberis pinnata Lag.

Subspecies
- Berberis pinnata subsp. insularis Munz; Berberis pinnata subsp. pinnata

Synonyms
- Mahonia pinnata (Lag.) Fedde

= Berberis pinnata =

Species of shrub

Berberis pinnata is a North American species of shrub in the barberry family. Common names include California barberry, California Oregon-grape, wavyleaf barberry, and shinyleaf mahonia.

== Description ==
Berberis pinnata is a dark green bush which resembles holly with its serrated leaves. There are 7–11 leaflets up to 6 centimetres (2 1/2 in) in length.

It has one to two inch long clusters of small yellow flowers. The fruit is a bluish-purple waxy berry about 7 millimetres (1/4 in) in size.

It is similar to the Oregon-grape (Berberis aquifolium), lending it the common name California Oregon-grape.

== Taxonomy ==
Berberis pinnata was given its first scientific description and named by Mariano Lagasca in 1816. As part of the botanical debate over the correct classification of species it was placed in Mahonia by Friedrich Karl Georg Fedde as Mahonia pinnata in 1901. Though scientific disagreement continues, as of 2023 the majority of botanical sources list this species in Berberis.

=== Etymology ===
Mahonia is named for Bernard McMahon (1775–1816), an American horticulturist. Pinnata means 'set in two opposite rows' or 'pinnate', and is a reference in this case to the arrangement of the leaflets.

== Distribution and habitat ==
It is native to the west coast of North America from British Columbia to Baja California.

It occurs in coastal, forest, woodland, chaparral, and other habitats.

== Ecology ==
Songbirds eat the berries.

== Conservation ==
One subspecies of this plant is very rare and is federally listed as an endangered species. It is known only from Santa Cruz Island, one of the Channel Islands of California, where it is known from 13 or fewer individuals.

== Uses ==
The fruits are edible. They have also been used to produce purple dye. The shrub is used in landscaping as an ornamental plant.
