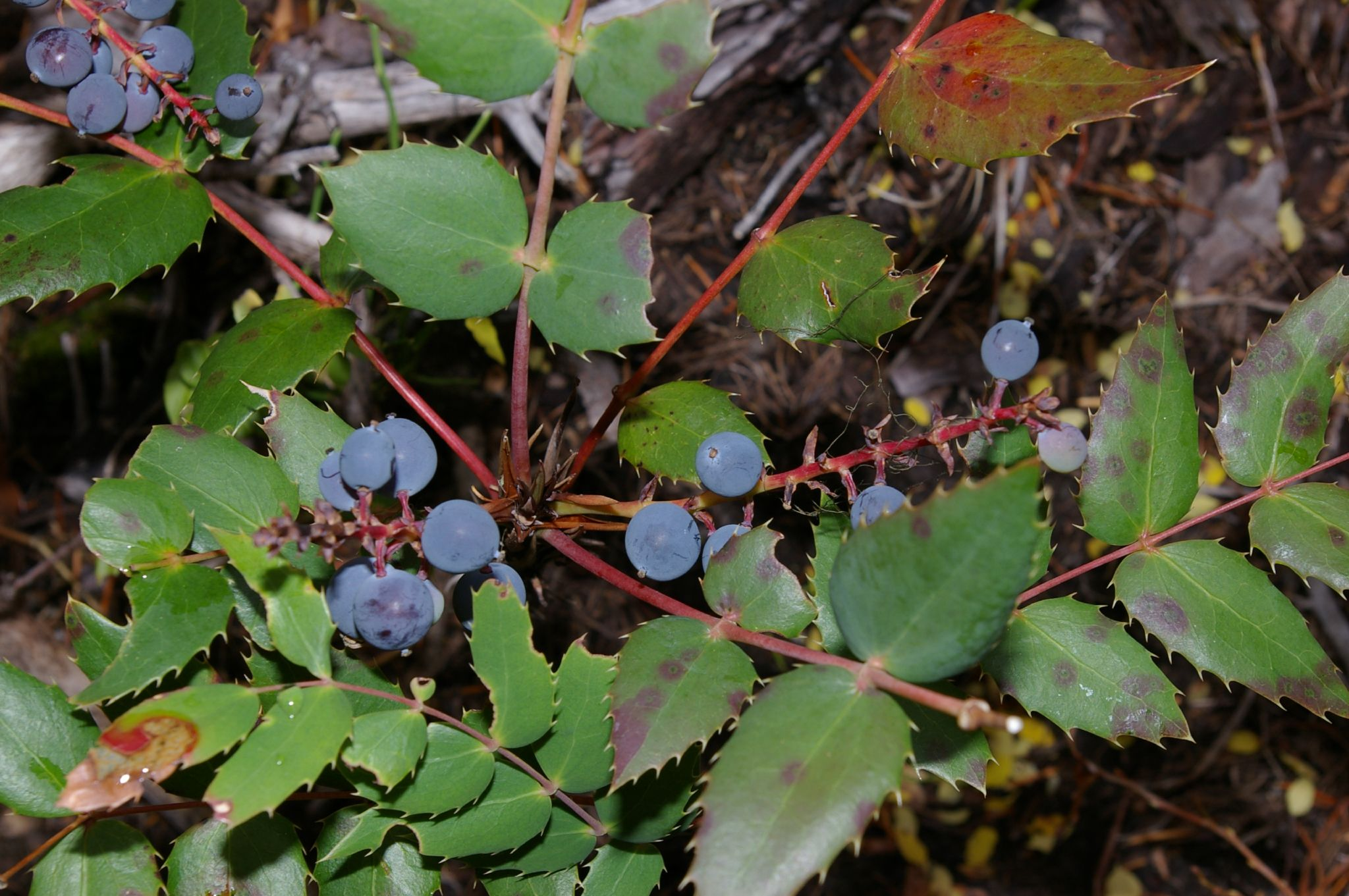

Conservation status
- Secure (NatureServe)

Scientific classification
- Kingdom: Plantae
- Clade: Tracheophytes
- Clade: Angiosperms
- Clade: Eudicots
- Order: Ranunculales
- Family: Berberidaceae
- Genus: Berberis
- Species: B. nervosa

Binomial name
- Berberis nervosa Pursh

Synonyms
- Berberis glumacea Spreng.; Berberis nervosa var. mendocinensis Roof; Berberis pinnata Buch ex DC.; Mahonia nervosa (Pursh) Nutt.; Mahonia glumacea DC.; Mahonia nervosa var. mendocinensis (Roof) Roof; Odostemon nervosus (Pursh) Rydb.

= Berberis nervosa =

Dull Oregon-grape

Species of flowering plant

Berberis nervosa, commonly known as dwarf Oregon-grape, Cascade barberry, Cascade Oregon-grape, or dull Oregon-grape, is a North American flowering plant.

== Description ==
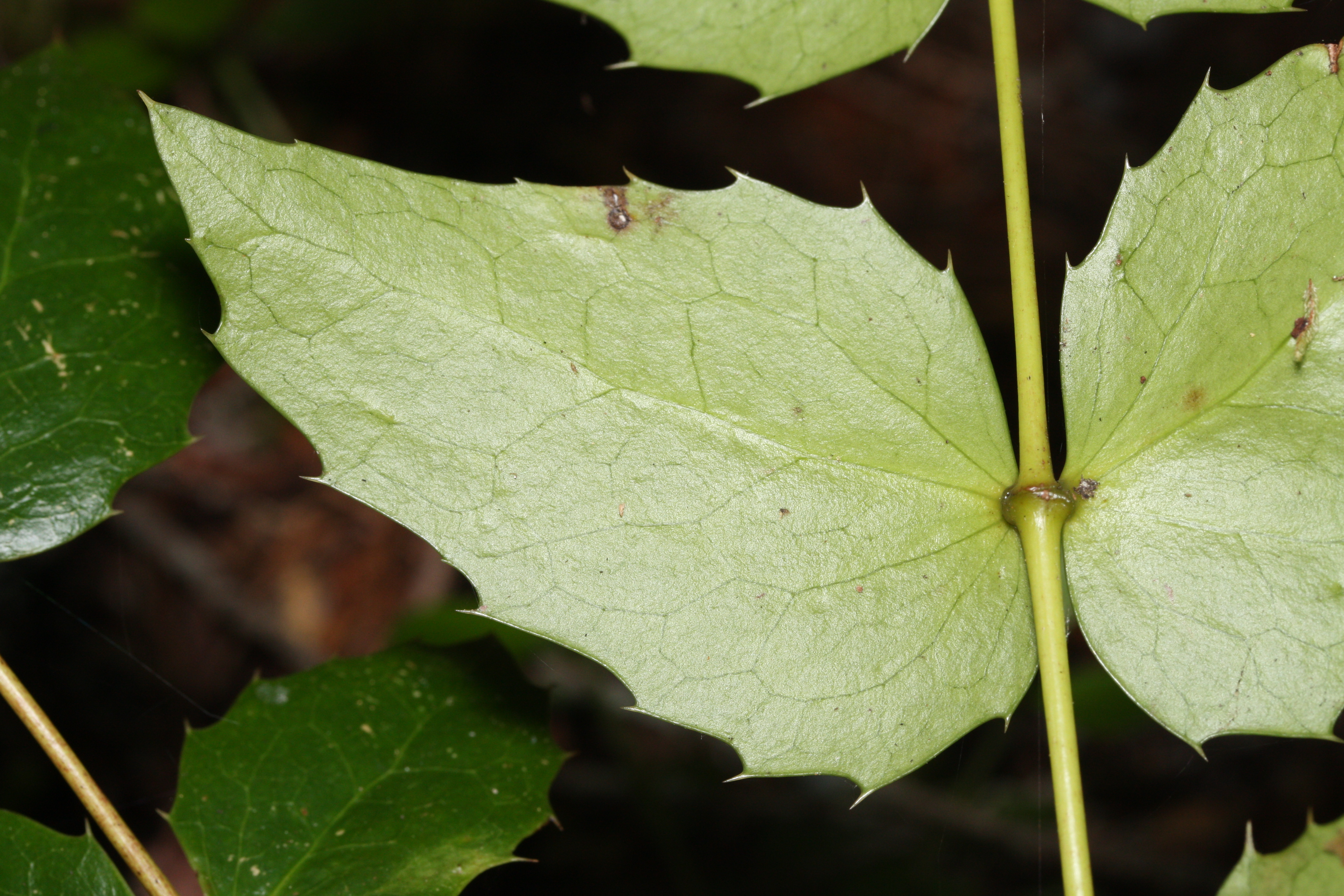
Lower surface of leaf showing opposite arrangement on stem, palmately nerved with 3 to 8 veins

It is an evergreen shrub with short vertical stems, mostly less than 61 centimetres (24 in), while the leaves reach higher, rarely up to 2.1 m (7 ft) tall on exceptional sites. The plant can reproduce via seeds or by vegetative means, sprouting from rhizomes which extend laterally through the soil.

The leaves are compound and oppositely arranged, with 9–21 leaflets. Each leaflet is up to 7 cm (3 in) long, strongly toothed, reminiscent of holly, and somewhat shiny, but less so than tall Oregon-grape. The leaflets do not have a single central vein as in that species, but several veins arranged fan-like, branched from the leaflet base, hence the epithet nervosa.

The flowers bloom from early to late spring and are similar to those of other Oregon-grapes, forming small yellow flowers in erect clusters up to 8 inches (20 cm) in length.

The fruits are dark-blue, globose berries 7 millimetres (1/4 in) in diameter, occurring in clusters and tart-tasting.

== Taxonomy ==
Berberis nervosa was scientifically described and named by German-American botanist Frederick Traugott Pursh in 1813. In 1818 Thomas Nuttall placed it in the new genus Mahonia as Mahonia nervosa. A paper published by Joseph Edward Laferrière in 1997 summarized the arguments in favor of Berberis as the correct classification. As of 2023 most botanists place the entire genus Mahonia within the genus Berberis including Plants of the World Online (POWO) and World Flora Online.

== Distribution and habitat ==
It is native to the northwest coast of North America from southern British Columbia south to central California, with an isolated population inland in northern Idaho. It is especially common in second growth, Douglas-fir or western redcedar forests, making use of those pools of sunlight that intermittently reach the ground.

In the Southeastern United States, the species has been classified as an invasive exotic species that may displace native vegetation.

== Ecology ==
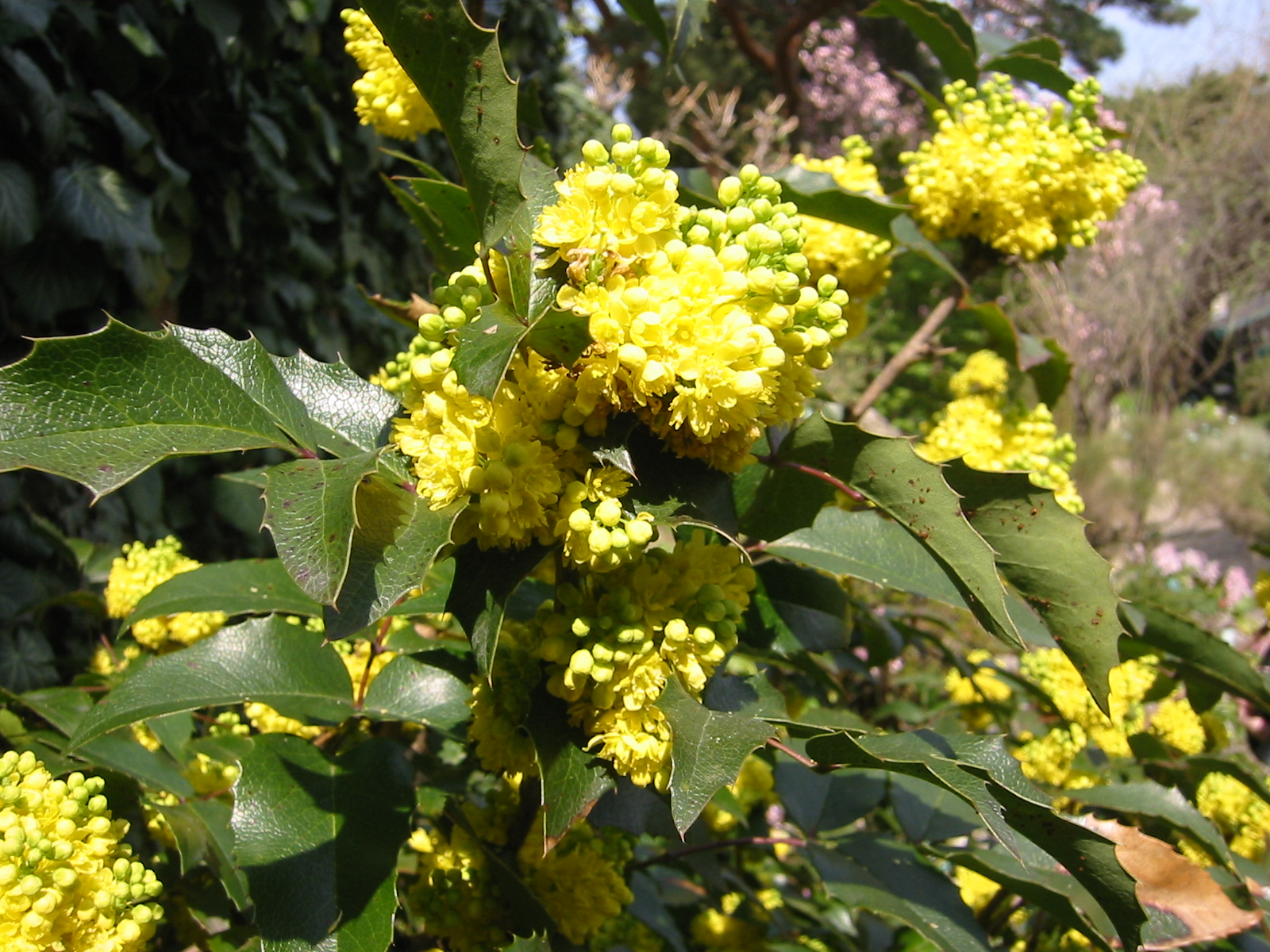
Berberis nervosa in bloom

Low Oregon-grape thrives in sun or shade and is a common or dominant species throughout the understories in montane, sub-montane, and mixed evergreen forests in the Pacific Northwest. It reaches greatest abundance on relatively dry and warm sites, but occurs in fairly moist environments as well. It grows in a variety of soil types. It is restricted to lower elevations, from sea level to 1,800 m (6,000 ft).

Berberis nervosa can complete its life cycle even in the deep shade of dense hemlock-western redcedar forests, so it is a climax species in old-growth forests where it is often dominant. It also occurs in disturbed sites, usually reaching peak abundance from 4 to 10 years after fire or clearcutting.

Its foliage is browsed by black-tailed deer and Roosevelt elk in some areas, but is ignored in others. Various small mammals feed on the foliage extensively, and it is extremely important food source for the white-footed vole in the Coast Range of Oregon. The fruits are eaten by small birds and mammals, and by black-tailed deer in some areas. The nectar of the genus Berberis is favored by the Anna's hummingbird.

== Uses ==
The Yana people dried and ground the fruits to make a mush. The fruits may also be dried and eaten similarly to raisins or used in preserves such as jelly.

Ethnobotanical records indicate that some Plateau Indigenous peoples prepared an infusion of the root for conditions translated as rheumatism. Such descriptions reflect English-language interpretations of Indigenous diagnostic categories and may refer more broadly to inflammatory or musculoskeletal conditions.

The plant contains the alkaloid berberine, which has been studied for antimicrobial and metabolic effects in laboratory and clinical research; however, these findings relate primarily to isolated compounds rather than documented traditional uses of the whole plant.

The inner bark, which is colored yellow by berberine, was used as a dye by Indigenous groups.

== In culture ==
The plant was collected by Lewis and Clark during their famous expedition to the West (before the species' scientific description).
