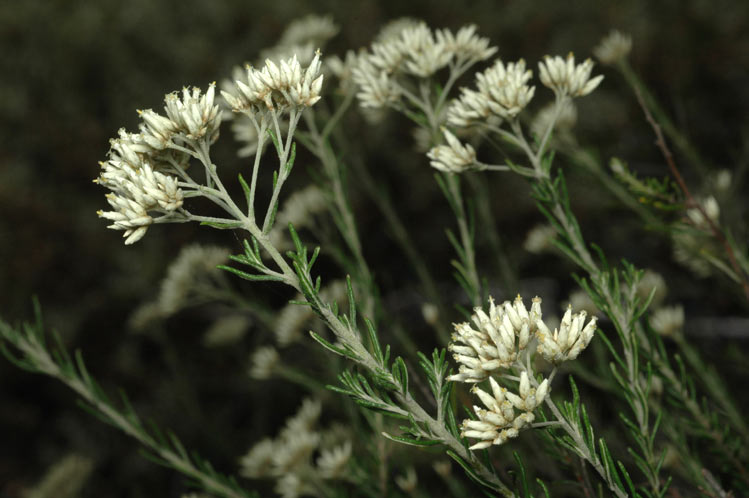

Scientific classification
- Kingdom: Plantae
- Clade: Tracheophytes
- Clade: Angiosperms
- Clade: Eudicots
- Clade: Asterids
- Order: Asterales
- Family: Asteraceae
- Genus: Cassinia
- Species: C. lepschii

Binomial name
- Cassinia lepschii Orchard

= Cassinia lepschii =

Species of flowering plant

Cassinia lepschii is a species of flowering plant in the family Asteraceae and is endemic to eastern Australia. It is an erect or spreading shrub with densely hairy young stems, needle-shaped leaves and flower heads arranged in flat or rounded corymbs.

== Description ==
Cassinia lepschii is an erect or spreading shrub that typically grows to a height of 0.7–2.0 m (2 ft 4 in – 6 ft 7 in), its young stems densely covered with cottony hairs. The leaves are cylindrical, 7–18 mm (0.28–0.71 in) long and about 1.0 mm (0.039 in) wide. The edges of the leaves are rolled under and the lower surface of the leaves is densely covered with cottony hairs. The flower heads are arranged in flat or rounded corymbs of 25 to 400 heads, each head with four or five cream-coloured florets surrounded by overlapping involucral bracts. Flowering occurs from March to June and the achenes are brown with a bristly pappus of 18 to 21 bristles.

== Taxonomy and naming ==
Cassinia lepschii was first formally described in 2005 by Anthony Edward Orchard in Australian Systematic Botany from specimens collected in Single National Park in 2003.

== Distribution and habitat ==
This species of Cassinia grows in forest, shrubland and woodland on the Northern Tablelands of New South Wales and in south-east Queensland.
