= Cassinia heleniae =

Scientific classification
- Kingdom: Plantae
- Clade: Tracheophytes
- Clade: Angiosperms
- Clade: Eudicots
- Clade: Asterids
- Order: Asterales
- Family: Asteraceae
- Genus: Cassinia
- Species: C. heleniae

Binomial name
- Cassinia heleniae Orchard

Species of flowering plant

Cassinia heleniae is a species of flowering plant in the family Asteraceae and is endemic to a small area in northern New South Wales. It is a shrub with a few sticky stems, sticky needle-shaped leaves and flower heads arranged in a rounded to flat-topped cyme.

== Description ==
Cassinia heleniae is a shrub that typically grows to a height of 1.0–1.5 m (3 ft 3 in – 4 ft 11 in) with its few stems sticky from its glandular hairs. The leaves are also sticky, cylindrical, 9–25 mm (0.35–0.98 in) long and 0.6–0.9 mm (0.024–0.035 in) wide. The lower surface of the leaves is densely covered with cottony hairs. The flower heads are arranged in round to flat-topped cymes, each head with five to seven white florets surrounded by papery involucral bracts. The achenes are olive brown with a bristly pappus of 19 to 25 bristles.

== Taxonomy and naming ==
Cassinia heleniae was first formally described in 2005 by Anthony Edward Orchard in Australian Systematic Botany from specimens he collected in Torrington State Park in 2004. The specific epithet (heleniae) honours Helen Thompson of the Australian Biological Resources Study.

== Distribution and habitat ==
This species of Cassinia is only known from the area around Torrington where it grows in forest in soils derived from granite.
