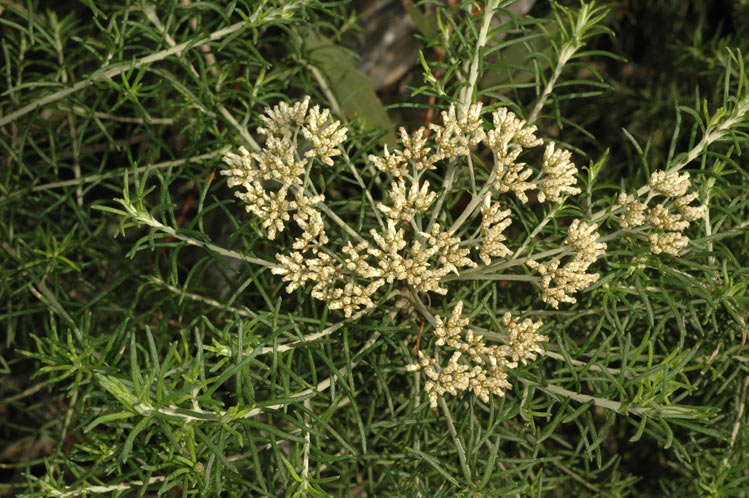

Scientific classification
- Kingdom: Plantae
- Clade: Tracheophytes
- Clade: Angiosperms
- Clade: Eudicots
- Clade: Asterids
- Order: Asterales
- Family: Asteraceae
- Genus: Cassinia
- Species: C. thinicola

Binomial name
- Cassinia thinicola Orchard

= Cassinia thinicola =

Sand everlasting

Species of flowering plant

Cassinia thinicola commonly known as sand everlasting, is a species of flowering plant in the family Asteraceae and is endemic to coastal New South Wales. It is a compact shrub with hairy young stems, needle-shaped to slightly flattened leaves, and corymbs of up to 150 flower heads.

== Description ==
Cassinia thinicola is an erect, many-branched shrub that typically grows to a height of 0.5–1.5 m (1 ft 8 in – 4 ft 11 in) with its young stems covered with cottony and glandular hairs. The leaves are needle-shaped to slightly flattened, 15–30 mm (0.59–1.18 in) long and about 1 mm (0.039 in) wide. The upper surface of the leaves is more or less glabrous, the edges are rolled under and the lower surface is densely woolly-hairy. The flower heads are about 4 mm (0.16 in) long with five to seven cream-coloured florets surrounded by papery involucral bracts in four or five whorls. Between 100 and 150 heads are arranged in rounded corymbs. Flowering occurs in March and the achenes are about 0.7 mm (0.028 in) long with a pappus of about 23 bristles about 2 mm (0.079 in) long.

== Taxonomy and naming ==
Cassinia thinicola was first formally described in 2004 by Anthony Edward Orchard in Australian Systematic Botany from specimens collected at Caves Beach in 2004. The specific epithet (thinicola) means "dune-inhabiting".

== Distribution ==
Cassinia thinicola grows on old sand dunes and cliffs near the coast between Berowra and Forster in New South Wales.
