= Cassinia ochracea =

Scientific classification
- Kingdom: Plantae
- Clade: Tracheophytes
- Clade: Angiosperms
- Clade: Eudicots
- Clade: Asterids
- Order: Asterales
- Family: Asteraceae
- Genus: Cassinia
- Species: C. ochracea

Binomial name
- Cassinia ochracea Orchard

Species of flowering plant

Cassinia ochracea is a species of flowering plant in the family Asteraceae and is endemic to south-eastern New South Wales. It is an erect or spreading shrub with hairy stems, needle-shaped leaves and flat or rounded corymbs of up to four hundred flower heads.

== Description ==
Cassinia ochracea is an erect or spreading shrub that typically grows to a height of 0.7–2 m (2 ft 4 in – 6 ft 7 in) with its stems densely covered with cottony white hairs. The leaves are needle-shaped, 7–18 mm (0.28–0.71 in) long and about 1.0 mm (0.039 in) wide. The edges of the leaves are rolled under and the lower surface is densely covered with white, woolly hairs. The flower heads are 4.5–5.0 mm (0.18–0.20 in) long, each with four or five florets surrounded by overlapping involucral bracts. Between 25 and 400 heads are arranged in flat or rounded corymbs. Flowering occurs from March to June and the achenes are deep reddish-brown, 1–1.3 mm (0.039–0.051 in) long with a pappus of 18 to 21 bristles 3.3–3.5 mm (0.13–0.14 in) long.

== Taxonomy and naming ==
Cassinia ochracea was first formally described in 2005 by Anthony Edward Orchard in Australian Systematic Botany from specimens collected south-west of Cooma in 2004. The specific epithet (ochracea) means "ochre-yellow".

== Distribution ==
This species of Cassinia occurs on the Southern Highlands of New South Wales, mainly in Kosciuszko National Park.
