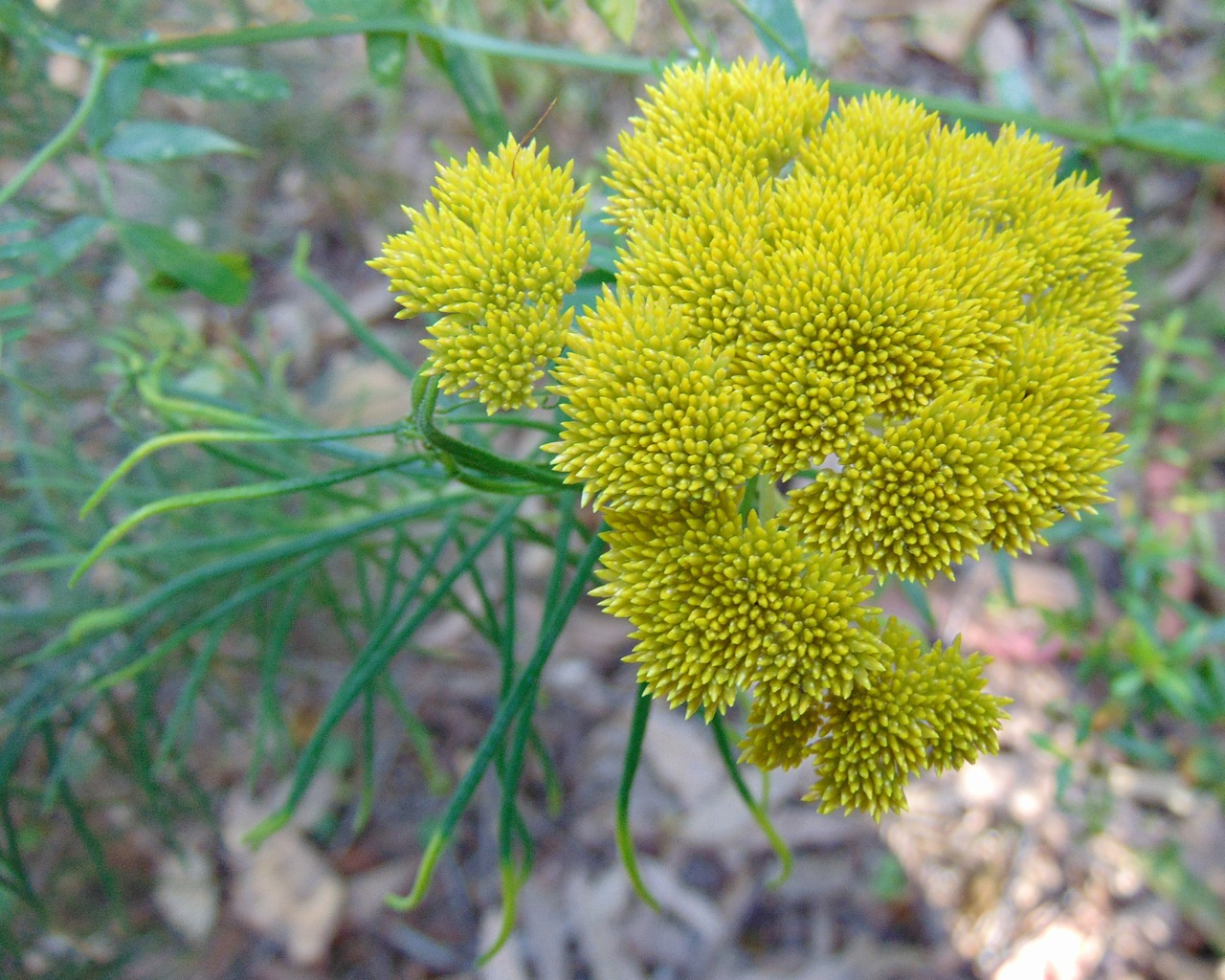

Scientific classification
- Kingdom: Plantae
- Clade: Tracheophytes
- Clade: Angiosperms
- Clade: Eudicots
- Clade: Asterids
- Order: Asterales
- Family: Asteraceae
- Genus: Cassinia
- Species: C. leptocephala

Binomial name
- Cassinia leptocephala F.Muell.

= Cassinia leptocephala =

Species of flowering plant

Cassinia leptocephala is a species of flowering plant in the family Asteraceae and is endemic to New South Wales. It is a large, woody shrub with hairy, reddish stems, stiff linear leaves, and heads of pale yellow flowers arranged in a dense corymb.

== Description ==
Cassinia leptocephala is a robust, woody shrub that typically grows to a height of up to 3 m (9.8 ft) and has reddish stems densely covered with yellowish glandular hairs. The leaves are stiff, linear, 50–80 mm (2.0–3.1 in) long and 1.0–2.5 mm (0.039–0.098 in) wide with the edges rolled under. The base of the leaves is stem-clasping and the lower surface is scaly and covered with glandular hairs. The flower heads are 2–5 mm (0.079–0.197 in) long and about 1 mm (0.039 in) wide, each with two or three pale yellow florets surrounded by three or four overlapping rows of involucral bracts. The heads are arranged in a dense corymb up to 120 mm (4.7 in) in diameter. The achenes are about 0.6 mm (0.024 in) long with a pappus about 2.5 mm (0.098 in) long.

== Taxonomy and naming ==
Cassinia leptocephala was first formally described in 1863 by Ferdinand von Mueller in Fragmenta phytographiae Australiae.

In 2004, Anthony Edward Orchard described two subspecies in Australian Systematic Botany, and the names are accepted by the Australian Plant Census:

- Cassinia leptocephala subsp. everettiae Orchard has woolly involucral bracts;
- Cassinia leptocephala Orchard subsp. leptocephala has more or less glabrous bracts.

== Distribution and habitat ==
This cassinia grows in forest, from the Sydney region to the New England National Park and west to the Warrumbungle Range in New South Wales. Subspecies everettiae is restricted to the Warrumbungle Range.
