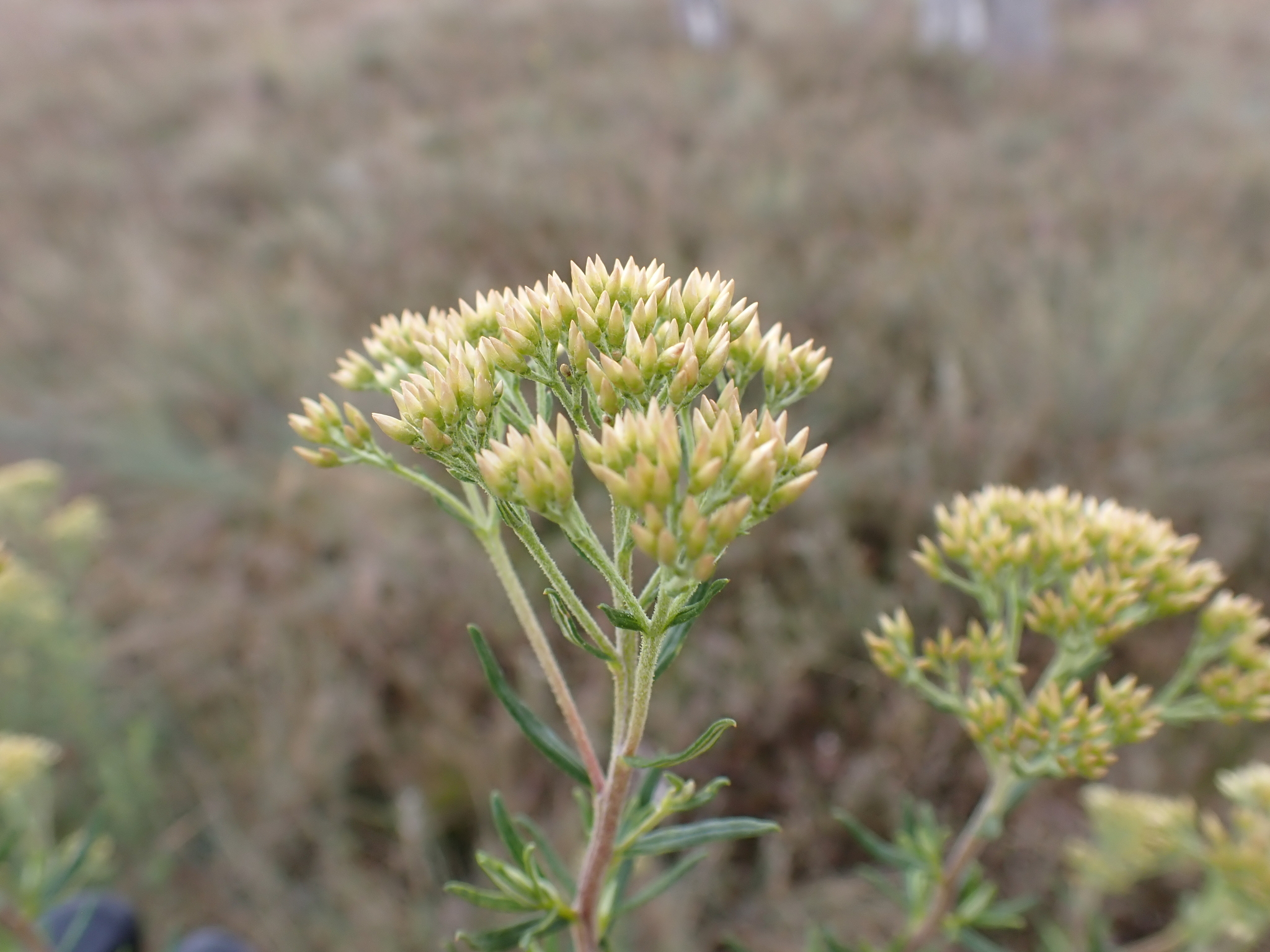

Scientific classification
- Kingdom: Plantae
- Clade: Tracheophytes
- Clade: Angiosperms
- Clade: Eudicots
- Clade: Asterids
- Order: Asterales
- Family: Asteraceae
- Genus: Cassinia
- Species: C. monticola

Binomial name
- Cassinia monticola Orchard

= Cassinia monticola =

Mountain cassinia

Species of flowering plant

Cassinia monticola commonly known as mountain cassinia, is a species of flowering plant in the family Asteraceae and is endemic to mountain areas of south-eastern Australia. It is a spreading shrub with sticky, narrow linear to narrow lance-shaped leaves, and bronze-coloured to greenish-cream heads of flowers arranged in a dense, round-topped corymb.

== Description ==
Cassinia maritima is a spreading shrub that typically grows to a height of 0.3–2.0 m (1 ft 0 in – 6 ft 7 in), its branches covered with cottony and glandular hairs. The leaves are narrow linear to narrow lance-shaped, 10–40 mm (0.39–1.57 in) long and 1–4 mm (0.039–0.157 in) wide, the upper surface of the leaves glossy green and sticky, the edges rolled under and the lower surface densely covered with white, woolly hairs. The flower heads are 4–6 mm (0.16–0.24 in) long and bronze-coloured, fading to straw-coloured or greenish-cream, each head with four to six creamy-white florets surrounded by sixteen to twenty overlapping involucral bracts in four whorls. The heads are arranged in groups of several hundred in a dense, round-topped corymb 10–85 mm (0.39–3.35 in) in diameter. Flowering occurs from February to March and the achenes are 1.2–1.5 mm (0.047–0.059 in) long with a pappus of 23 to 26 bristles.

== Taxonomy and naming ==
Cassinia maritima was first formally described in 2004 by Anthony Edward Orchard in Australian Systematic Botany from specimens collected near Thredbo in 2004. The specific epithet (monticola) means "dweller in mountains".

== Distribution and habitat ==
Mountain cassinia grows in herbfield, grassland and shrubland in alpine and subalpine areas above 1,200 m (3,900 ft) in the Snowy Mountains of southern New South Wales and mountain areas of north-eastern Victoria.
