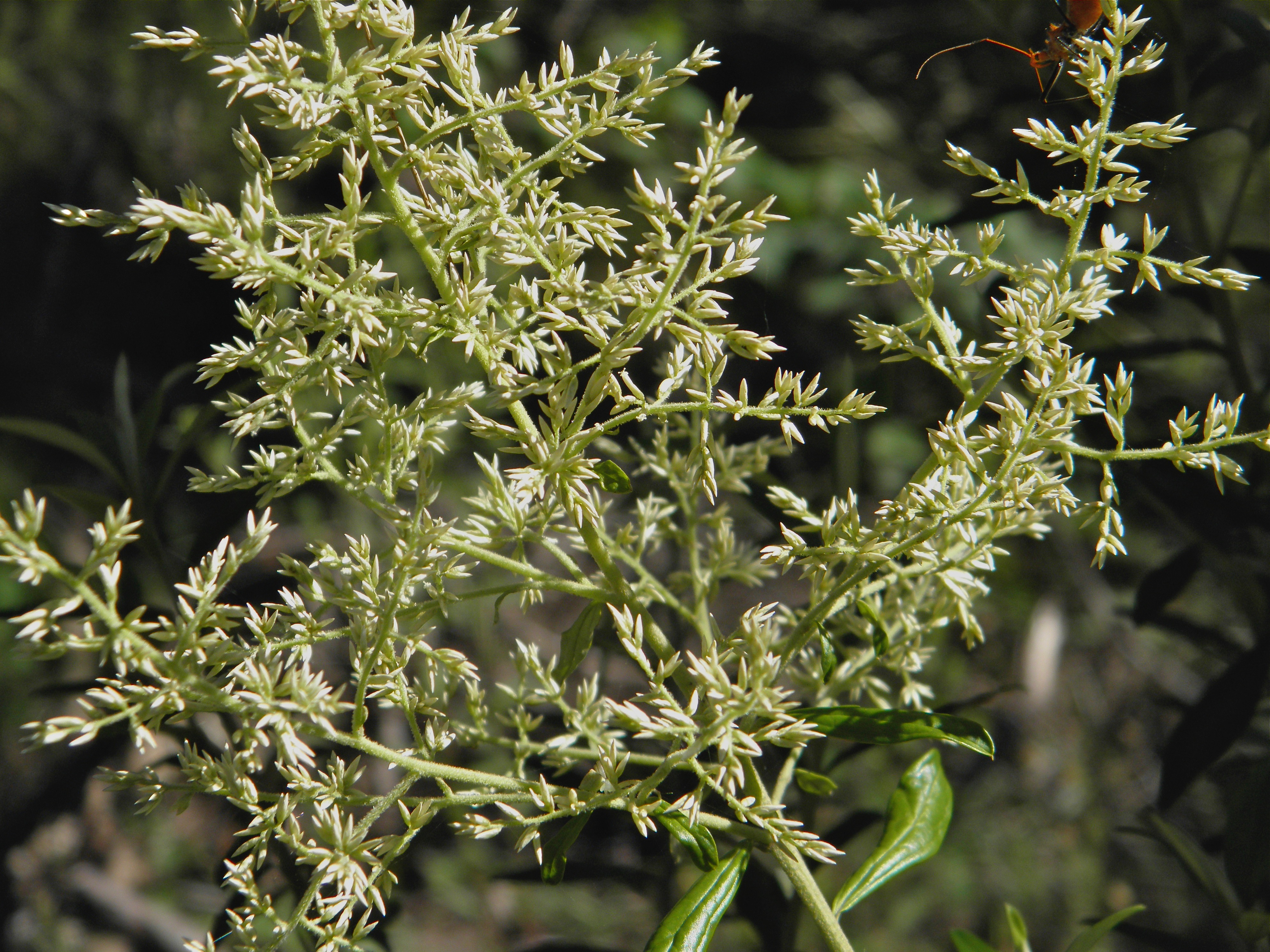
- Cassinia subtropica near Paluma

Scientific classification
- Kingdom: Plantae
- Clade: Tracheophytes
- Clade: Angiosperms
- Clade: Eudicots
- Clade: Asterids
- Order: Asterales
- Family: Asteraceae
- Genus: Cassinia
- Species: C. subtropica

Binomial name
- Cassinia subtropica F.Muell.

= Cassinia subtropica =

Bushy rosemary

Species of flowering plant

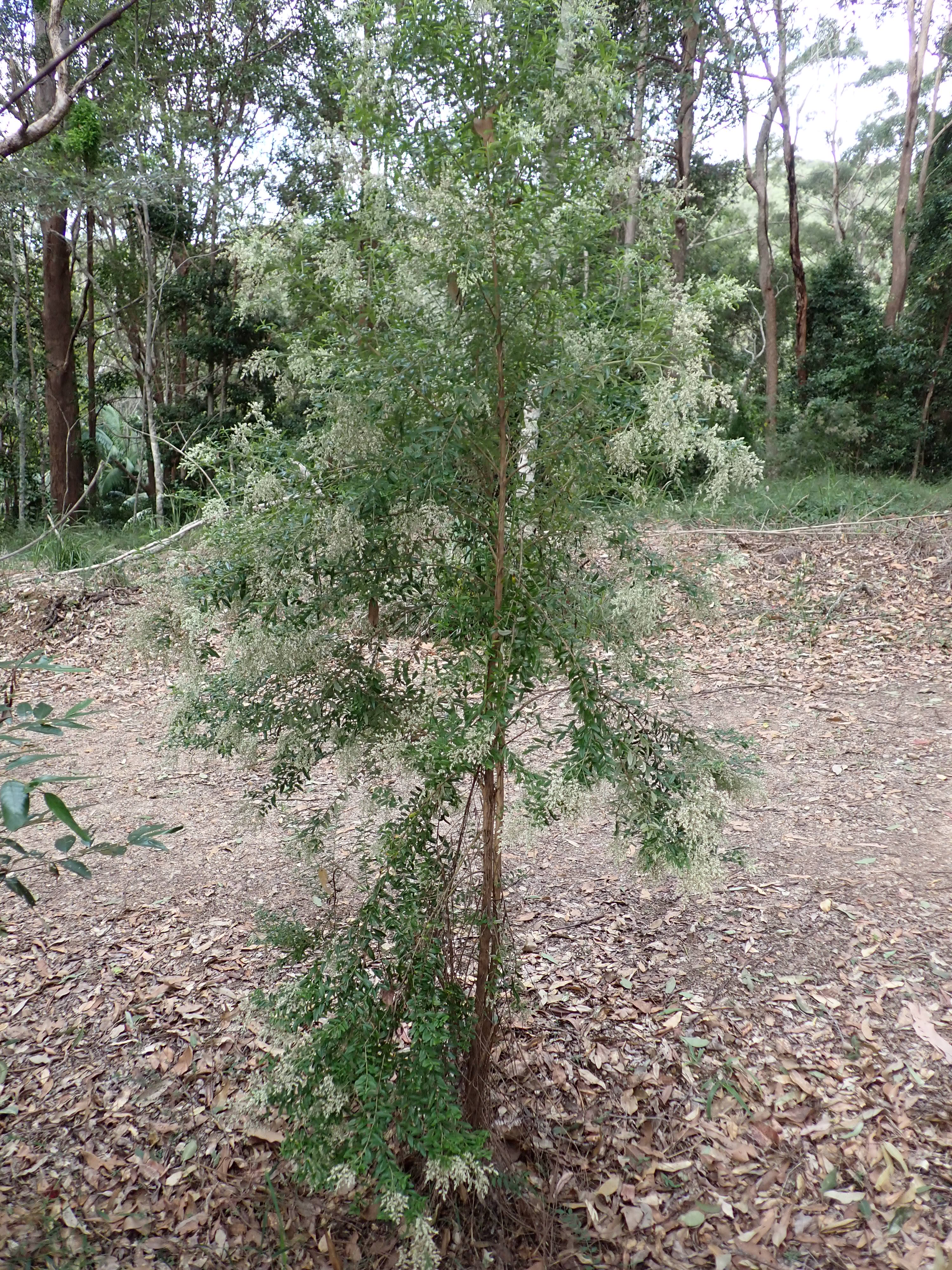
Habit in the Maroochy Regional Bushland Botanic Garden, Tanawha

Cassinia subtropica, commonly known as bushy rosemary, is a species of flowering plant in the family Asteraceae and is endemic to north-eastern Australia. It is shrub with woolly-hairy stems, lance-shaped to egg-shaped leaves and panicles of flower heads.

== Description ==
Cassinia subtropica is a shrub that typically grows to a height of up to 2 m (6 ft 7 in) and has grey or brown stems covered with fine, woolly hairs. The leaves are lance-shaped to egg-shaped, 10–30 mm (0.39–1.18 in) long and 3–7 mm (0.12–0.28 in) wide. The upper surface of the leaves is glabrous and the lower surface is covered with whitish to rust-coloured hairs. The flower heads are linear to narrow bell-shaped, 3–4 mm (0.12–0.16 in) long and about 1.0 mm (0.039 in) long, each head with one or two cream-coloured to pale brown florets surrounded by about loose, overlapping involucral bracts in three or four whorls. The heads are arranged in panicles up to 100 mm (3.9 in) long and 60 mm (2.4 in) wide. Flowering occurs in autumn and winter and the achenes are about 0.6 mm (0.024 in) long with a pappus of barbed hairs about 2 mm (0.079 in) long.

== Taxonomy and naming ==
Cassinia subtropica was first formally described in 1858 by Ferdinand von Mueller in Fragmenta phytographiae Australiae from specimens collected by Walter Hill.

== Distribution ==
This cassinia grows in forest and on the edges of rainforest from north-east and central-eastern Queensland to far north-eastern New South Wales.
