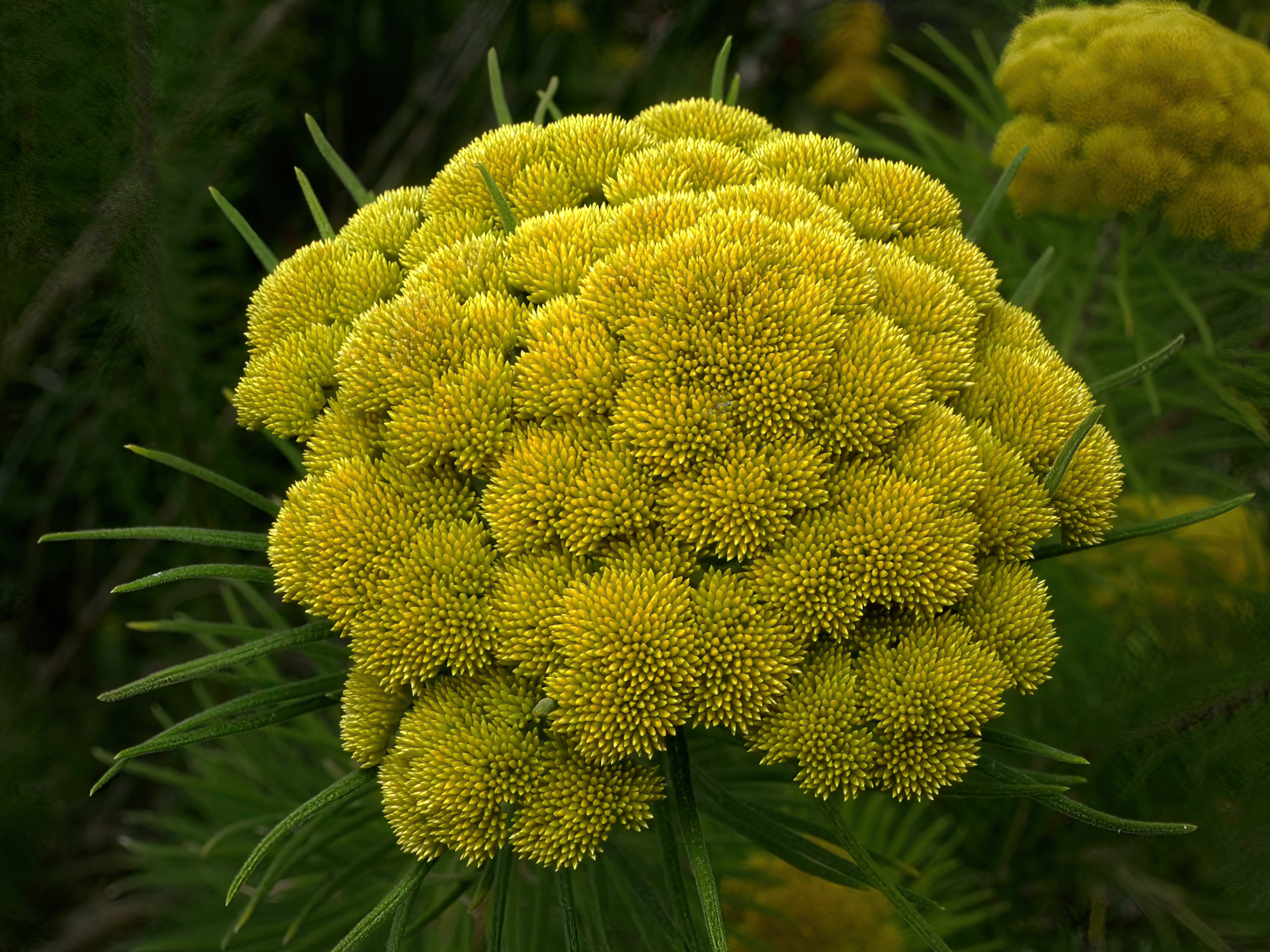

Scientific classification
- Kingdom: Plantae
- Clade: Tracheophytes
- Clade: Angiosperms
- Clade: Eudicots
- Clade: Asterids
- Order: Asterales
- Family: Asteraceae
- Genus: Cassinia
- Species: C. compacta

Binomial name
- Cassinia compacta F.Muell.

= Cassinia compacta =

Species of flowering plant

Cassinia compacta is a species of flowering plant in the family Asteraceae and is endemic to eastern Australia. It is a shrub with densely hairy stems, linear leaves and heads of yellow flowers arranged in dense corymbs.

== Description ==
Cassinia compacta is a woody shrub that typically grows to a height of 2–3 m (6 ft 7 in – 9 ft 10 in), its branches densely covered with erect glandular hairs. The leaves are linear, 20–70 mm (0.79–2.76 in) long and 1–3 mm (0.039–0.118 in) wide, dark green and sticky or scaly on the upper surface and hairy below. The flower heads are about 4 mm (0.16 in) long and 2 mm (0.079 in) in diameter, each with five or six yellow florets surrounded by four or five overlapping whorls of golden-brown involucral bracts that are wrinkled near the tip. The heads are arranged in a dense corymb up to 120 mm (4.7 in) in diameter. Flowering occurs in spring and summer and the achenes are about 0.5 mm (0.020 in) long with a pappus 2–2.5 mm (0.079–0.098 in) long.

== Taxonomy ==
Cassinia compacta was first formally described in 1858 by Ferdinand von Mueller in Fragmenta phytographiae Australiae from specimens collected by Walter Hill on Mount Lindesay at a height of "5,000 ft (1,500 m)".

== Distribution and habitat ==
This cassinia grows in woodland and forest in north from Fitzroy Falls in New South Wales and in south-east Queensland.
