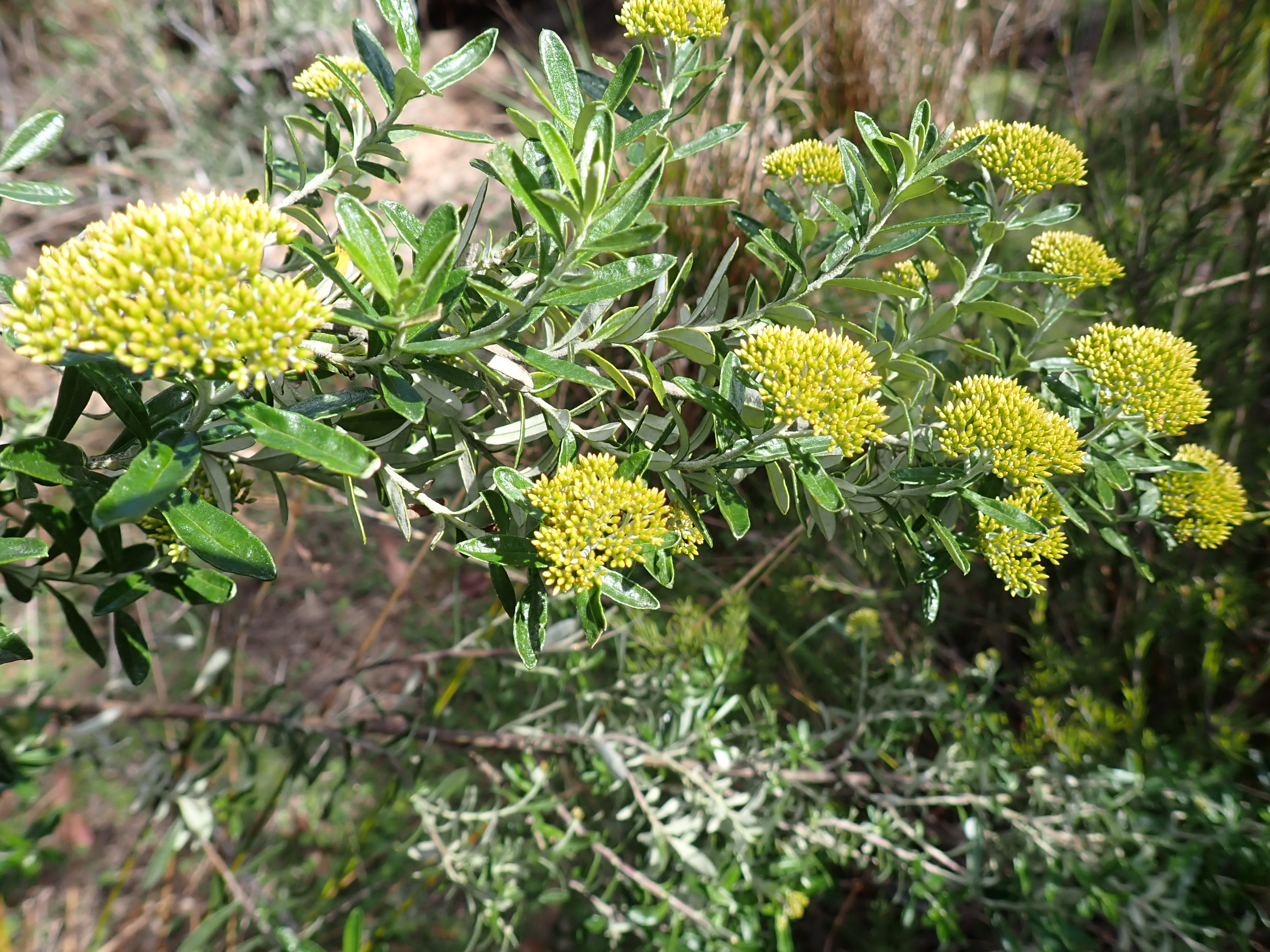
- In Cathedral Rock National Park

Scientific classification
- Kingdom: Plantae
- Clade: Tracheophytes
- Clade: Angiosperms
- Clade: Eudicots
- Clade: Asterids
- Order: Asterales
- Family: Asteraceae
- Genus: Cassinia
- Species: C. telfordii

Binomial name
- Cassinia telfordii Orchard

= Cassinia telfordii =

Species of flowering plant

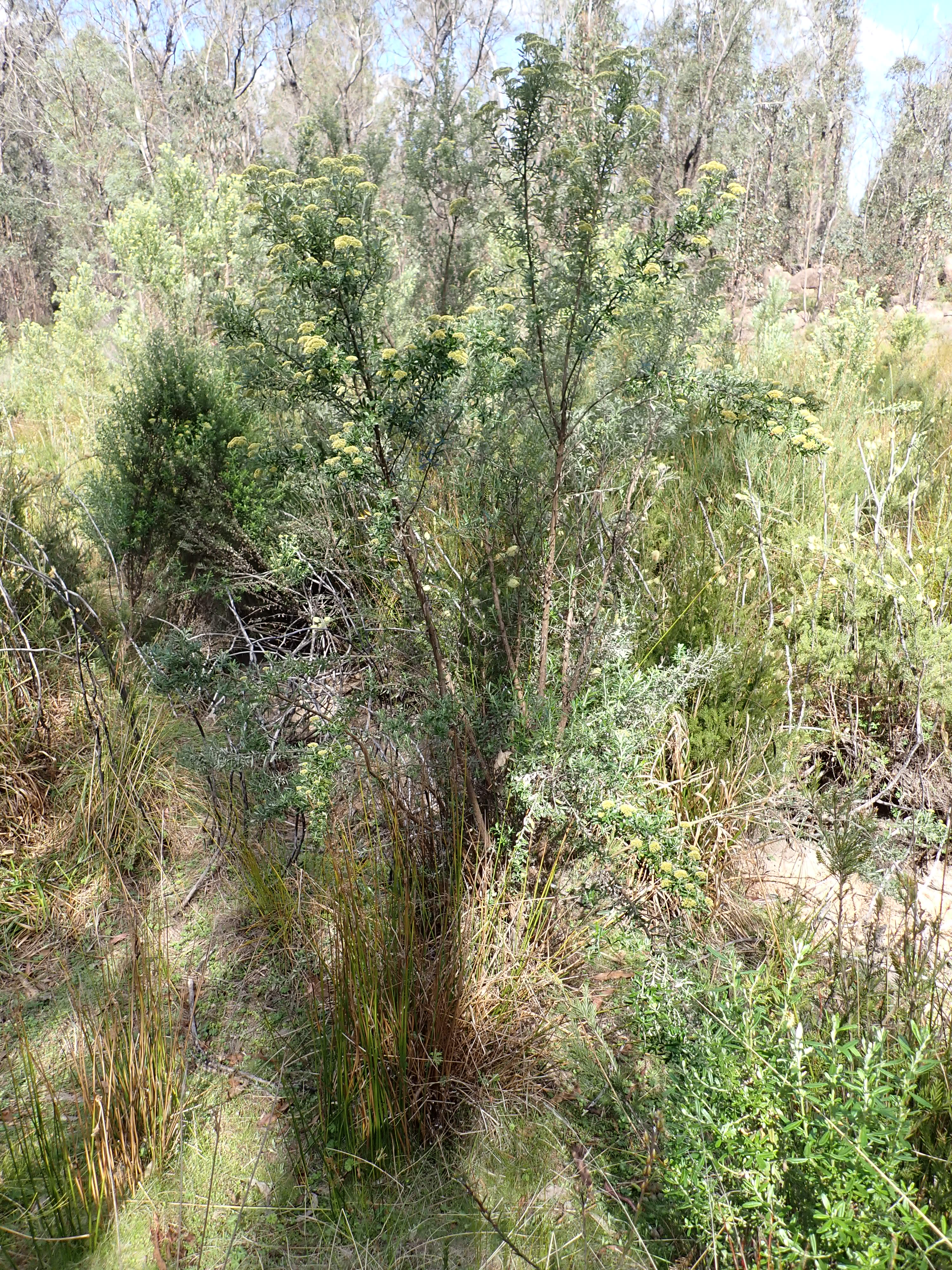
Habit

Cassinia telfordii is a species of flowering plant in the family Asteraceae and is endemic to eastern Australia. It is an erect shrub with hairy young stems, linear leaves and corymbs of up to several hundred yellow to cream-coloured flower heads.

== Description ==
Cassinia telfordii is an erect shrub that typically grows to a height of 1.5–5 m (4 ft 11 in – 16 ft 5 in) with its young stems covered with cottony hairs, ageing to reddish-brown and glabrous. The leaves are linear, 30–85 mm (1.2–3.3 in) long and 1.5–4 mm (0.059–0.157 in) wide. The upper surface of the leaves is dark, glossy green, the edges are rolled down and the lower surface is paler green. The flower heads are 3–4 mm (0.12–0.16 in) long, each head with five or six yellow to cream coloured florets surrounded by ten to twelve overlapping involucral bracts in two or three whorls. Up to several hundred heads are arranged in each round-topped corymb. Flowering occurs from November to May and the achenes are 0.8 mm (0.031 in) long with a pappus of 16–25 bristles.

== Taxonomy and naming ==
Cassinia telfordii was first formally described in 2004 by Anthony Edward Orchard in Australian Systematic Botany from specimens collected in the Mount Hyland Nature Reserve in 2004.

== Distribution ==
Cassinia telfordii grows in forest and on the edges of rainforest at altitudes above 600 m (2,000 ft) on the Northern Tablelands of New South Wales.
