= Cassinia accipitrum =

Scientific classification
- Kingdom: Plantae
- Clade: Tracheophytes
- Clade: Angiosperms
- Clade: Eudicots
- Clade: Asterids
- Order: Asterales
- Family: Asteraceae
- Genus: Cassinia
- Species: C. accipitrum

Binomial name
- Cassinia accipitrum Orchard

Species of flowering plant

Cassinia accipitrum is a species of flowering plant in the family Asteraceae and is endemic to eastern New South Wales. It is an erect shrub with spreading, dark green leaves that are covered with cottony hair on the underside, and heads of yellowish brown flowers arranged in rounded cymes.

== Description ==
Cassinia accipitrum is an erect shrub that typically grows to a height of 1–2 m (3 ft 3 in – 6 ft 7 in) with green to reddish young branches covered with cottony and glandular hairs. The leaves are 20–25 mm (0.79–0.98 in) long and 1–3 mm (0.039–0.118 in) wide, sometimes with the edges rolled under. The upper surface of the leaves is glossy dark green and the lower surface is covered with felt-like, cottony white hairs. The flower heads are arranged in a rounded, compound cyme of 50 to 300 yellowish-brown flowers, each head 3–5 mm (0.12–0.20 in) long with about twelve to sixteen, yellowish-brown involucral bracts in two or three whorls. Flowering occurs in October and November and the achene is 0.9–1.1 mm (0.035–0.043 in) long with a pappus of seventeen to twenty densely-barbed bristles.

== Taxonomy and naming ==
Cassinia accipitrum was first formally described in 2004 by Anthony Edward Orchard in Australian Systematic Botany from specimens collected by Obed David Evans near Colo Heights in 1960.

== Distribution and habitat ==
This species of Cassinia grows in forest in the valleys of the Hawkesbury and Colo Rivers.
