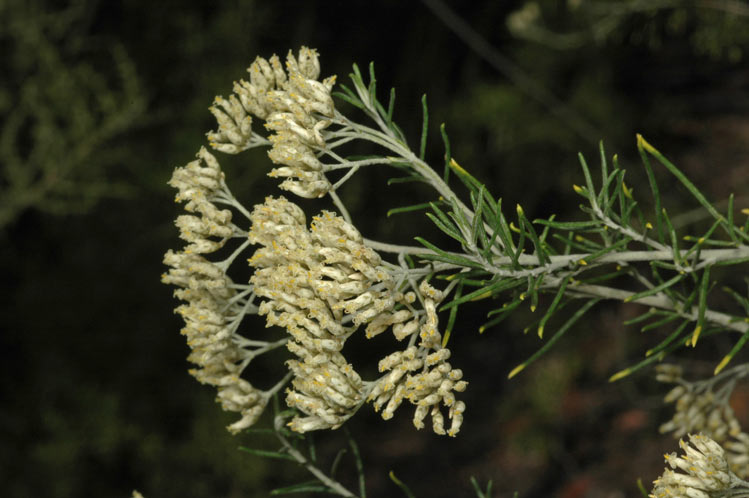

Scientific classification
- Kingdom: Plantae
- Clade: Tracheophytes
- Clade: Angiosperms
- Clade: Eudicots
- Clade: Asterids
- Order: Asterales
- Family: Asteraceae
- Genus: Cassinia
- Species: C. uncata

Binomial name
- Cassinia uncata A.Cunn. ex DC.

= Cassinia uncata =

Sticky cassinia

Species of flowering plant

Cassinia uncata, commonly known as sticky cassinia, is a species of flowering plant in the family Asteraceae and is native to inland New South Wales and the south-east of South Australia. It is an erect shrub with hairy young stems, narrow linear to needle-shaped leaves, and heads of off-white to cream-coloured flowers arranged in rounded, almost conical panicles.

== Description ==
Cassinia uncata is an erect shrub that typically grows to a height of 1–2 m (3 ft 3 in – 6 ft 7 in) with woolly-hairy, olive-brown young stems. The leaves are narrow linear to needle-shaped, 6–12 mm (0.24–0.47 in) long and 0.5–1 mm (0.020–0.039 in) wide. The leaf upper surface of the leaves is wrinkled and slightly sticky, the edges are rolled under, the lower surface is densely woolly-hairy and there is a hooked tip on the end. The flower heads are 3.0–3.5 mm (0.12–0.14 in) long, surrounded by eighteen to twenty papery involucral bracts in four to six whorls. Between 25 and 150 heads are arranged in more or less conical panicles along the branches. Flowering occurs from December to July and the achenes are 0.6–1.0 mm (0.024–0.039 in) long with a pappus of about eighteen bristles.

== Taxonomy and naming ==
Cassinia uncata was first formally described in 1838 by Augustin Pyramus de Candolle from an unpublished description by Allan Cunningham and the description was published in Prodromus Systematis Naturalis Regni Vegetabilis. The specific epithet (uncata) means "hooked" or "bent inwards".

== Distribution and habitat ==
This cassinia grows in woodland, mallee and scrub on the western slopes and plains of inland New South Wales and the south-east of South Australia.
