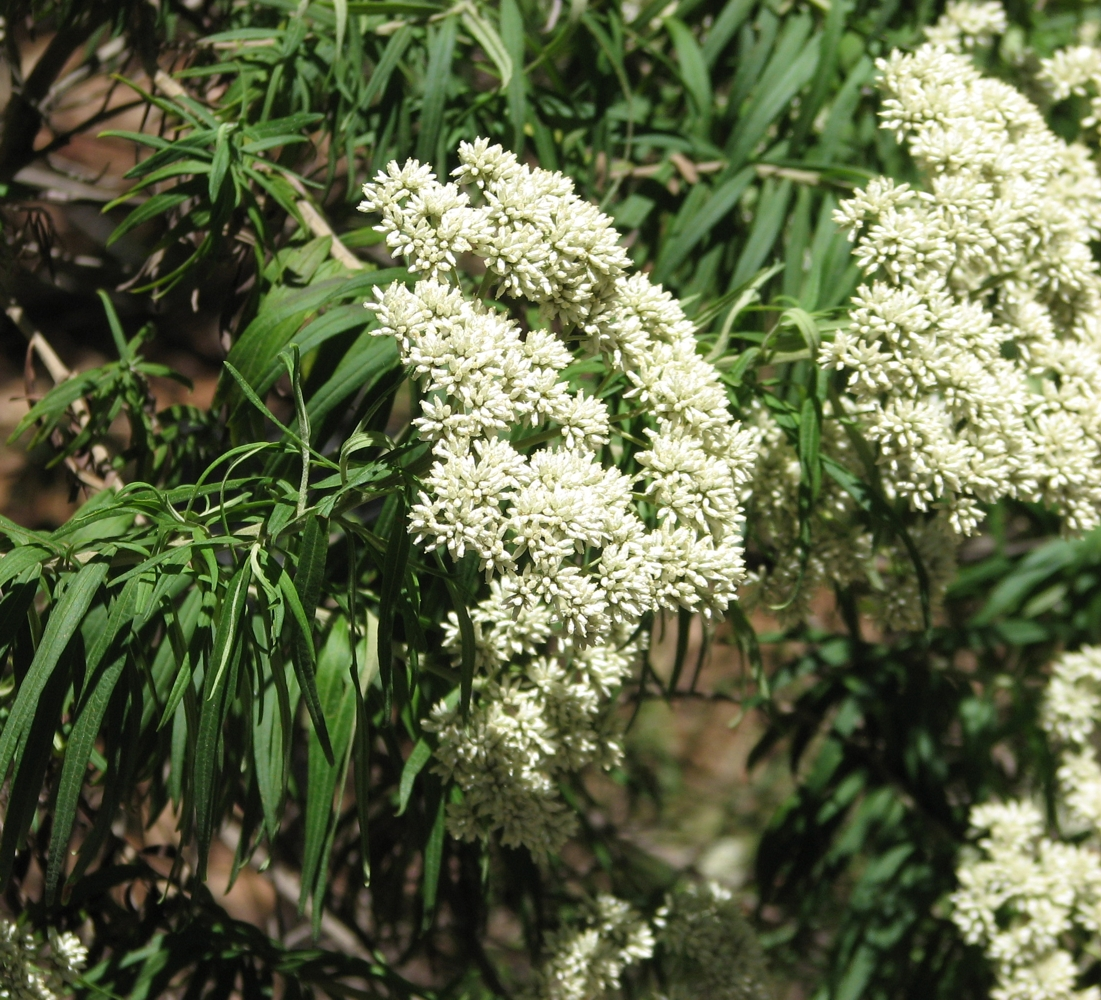

Scientific classification
- Kingdom: Plantae
- Clade: Tracheophytes
- Clade: Angiosperms
- Clade: Eudicots
- Clade: Asterids
- Order: Asterales
- Family: Asteraceae
- Genus: Cassinia
- Species: C. trinerva

Binomial name
- Cassinia trinerva N.A.Wakef.

= Cassinia trinerva =

Species of flowering plant

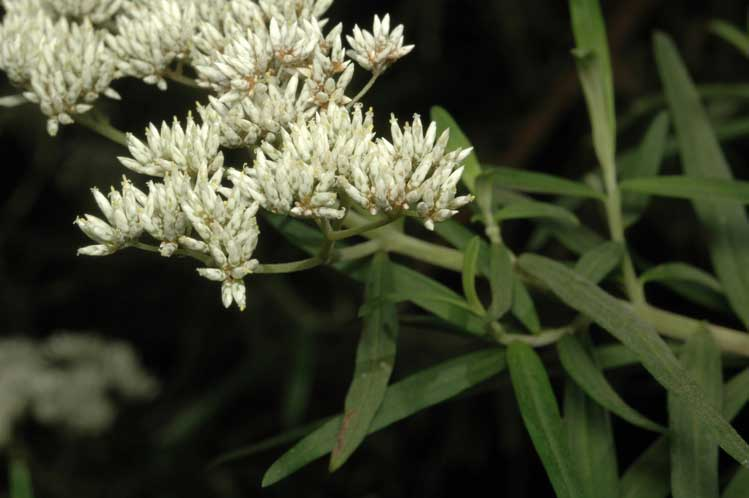
Detail of flower heads

Cassinia trinerva is a species of flowering plant in the family Asteraceae and is endemic to south-eastern Australia. It is an erect shrub or small tree with hairy stems, narrow lance-shaped leaves, and flower heads arranged in dense corymbs.

== Description ==
Cassinia trinerva is an erect shrub or tree that typically grows to a height of up to about 8 m (26 ft), its branchlets sticky and covered with glandular and cottony hairs. The leaves are narrow lance-shaped, 30–120 mm (1.2–4.7 in) long and 3.5–6 mm (0.14–0.24 in) wide on a petiole 1–4 mm (0.039–0.157 in) long with three longitudinal veins. The upper surface of the leaves is slightly sticky and the lower surface is cottony-hairy. The flower heads are 2.5–3.5 mm (0.098–0.138 in) long and 1–1.5 mm (0.039–0.059 in) wide with three or four white florets surrounded by fourteen to eighteen involucral bracts in three to five whorls. The heads are crowded in dense corymbs 60–120 mm (2.4–4.7 in) in diameter. Flowering occurs from December to March and the achenes are 0.5–1.0 mm (0.020–0.039 in) long with a pappus 2.0–2.5 mm (0.079–0.098 in) long.

== Taxonomy and naming ==
Cassinia trinerva was first formally described in 1951 by Norman Arthur Wakefield in The Victorian Naturalist.

== Distribution ==
This cassinia is an understorey shrub in tall forests, on the edge of rainforest and on dry rocky sites. It occurs in south-eastern Queensland, on the coast and tablelands of New South Wales south from Bolivia, in south-eastern Victoria and north-eastern Tasmania.
