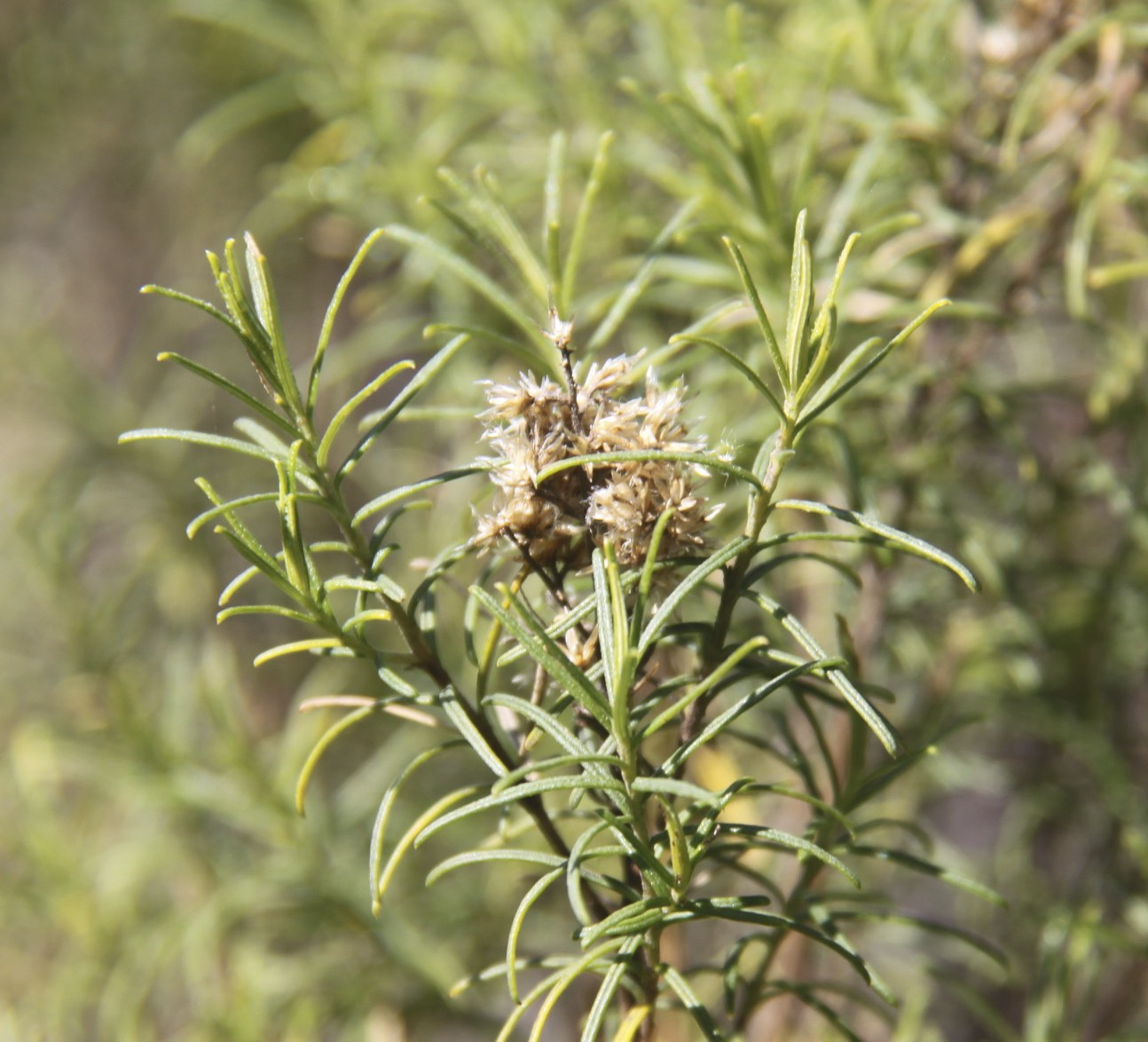
- Near Mount Kaputar

Scientific classification
- Kingdom: Plantae
- Clade: Tracheophytes
- Clade: Angiosperms
- Clade: Eudicots
- Clade: Asterids
- Order: Asterales
- Family: Asteraceae
- Genus: Cassinia
- Species: C. macrocephala

Binomial name
- Cassinia macrocephala Orchard

= Cassinia macrocephala =

Species of flowering plant

Cassinia macrocephala is a species of flowering plant in the family Asteraceae and is endemic to northern New South Wales. It is a shrub with narrow linear leaves and spherical, white to cream-coloured or yellowish-green heads.

== Description ==
Cassinia macrocephala is a shrub that typically grows to a height of 1–2 m (3 ft 3 in – 6 ft 7 in) with a few erect stems. The leaves are narrow linear, 20–70 mm (0.79–2.76 in) long and 0.7–2.0 mm (0.028–0.079 in) wide, depending on subspecies. The flowers heads are spherical, white to cream-soloured or yellowish-green and arranged on a peduncle, each head with five to seventeen white florets surrounded by involucral bracts. The achenes are purplish brown, about 1 mm (0.039 in) long with a pappus of 20 to 27 barbed bristles about 2 mm (0.079 in) long.

== Taxonomy and naming ==
Cassinia macrocephala was first formally described in 2004 by Anthony Edward Orchard in Australian Systematic Botany from specimens collected near Moonbi in 2004. The specific epithet (macrocephala) means "large-headed".

In the same journal, Orchard described two subspecies and in 2006 two further subspecies in a later edition of Australian Systematic Botany, and the names of the four subspecies are accepted by the Australian Plant Census:

- Cassinia macrocaphala Orchard subsp. macrocephala has leaves 30–70 mm (1.2–2.8 in) long, 1–2 mm (0.039–0.079 in) wide and usually 15 to 17 florets per head;
- Cassinia macrocaphala subsp. petrapendula Orchard has leaves 25–55 mm (0.98–2.17 in) long, 0.7–0.8 mm (0.028–0.031 in) wide and usually 5 to 7 florets per head;
- Cassinia macrocaphala subsp. storyi Orchard has leaves 60–70 mm (2.4–2.8 in) long, 1.3–1.5 mm (0.051–0.059 in) wide and usually 8 florets per head;
- Cassinia macrocaphala subsp. storyi Orchard has leaves 30–35 mm (1.2–1.4 in) long, 0.7–1.0 mm (0.028–0.039 in) wide and usually 9 or 10 florets per head;

== Distribution and habitat ==
This species of Cassinia grows on granite soils in forest in New South Wales. Subspecies macrocaphala occurs on the Northern Tablelands, subsp. petrapendula is only found in a restricted area near Nundle, and subsp. storyi is only known from the type location near Coolah Tops and subsp. tenuis near Inverell.
