= Cassinia theresae =

Scientific classification
- Kingdom: Plantae
- Clade: Tracheophytes
- Clade: Angiosperms
- Clade: Eudicots
- Clade: Asterids
- Order: Asterales
- Family: Asteraceae
- Genus: Cassinia
- Species: C. theresae

Binomial name
- Cassinia theresae Orchard

Species of flowering plant

Cassinia theresae is a species of flowering plant in the family Asteraceae and is endemic to central New South Wales. It is an erect shrub with hairy young stems, needle-shaped leaves with flared bases, and corymbs of up to fifty flower heads.

== Description ==
Cassinia theresae is an erect shrub that typically grows to a height of 0.6–1.3 m (2 ft 0 in – 4 ft 3 in) with its young stems greenish but covered with cottony and glandular hairs. The leaves are needle-shaped but with a flared base, 12–22 mm (0.47–0.87 in) long and 0.6–1.3 mm (0.024–0.051 in) wide. The upper surface of the leaves is densely scaly, the edges are rolled under and the lower surface is densely covered with white hairs. The flower heads are 4–6 mm (0.16–0.24 in) long, each head with eight to fifteen cream-coloured florets surrounded by papery involucral bracts in five whorls. Between ten and fifty heads are arranged in corymbs 20–25 mm (0.79–0.98 in) in diameter. Flowering occurs from January to July and the achenes are 0.5–0.8 mm (0.020–0.031 in) long with a pappus of thirteen to twenty-four bristles.

== Taxonomy and naming ==
Cassinia theresae was first formally described in 2004 by Anthony Edward Orchard in Australian Systematic Botany from specimens collected between Tottenham and Tullamore in 2004.

== Distribution ==
Cassinia theresae grows in woodland on plains in south-central New South Wales.
