= Cassinia diminuta =

Scientific classification
- Kingdom: Plantae
- Clade: Tracheophytes
- Clade: Angiosperms
- Clade: Eudicots
- Clade: Asterids
- Order: Asterales
- Family: Asteraceae
- Genus: Cassinia
- Species: C. diminuta

Binomial name
- Cassinia diminuta Orchard

Species of flowering plant

Cassinia diminuta, commonly known as dwarf cassinia, is a species of flowering plant in the family Asteraceae and is endemic to Victoria in Australia. It is a small, erect, aromatic shrub with spreading, needle-shaped leaves that are covered with cottony hair on the underside, and corymbs of up to two hundred heads of flowers arranged in corymbs.

== Description ==
Cassinia diminuta is an erect, aromatic shrub that typically grows to a height of 50–70 cm (20–28 in) with densely-hairy branchlets. The leaves are needle-shaped, 5–18 mm (0.20–0.71 in) long and 0.7–1 mm (0.028–0.039 in) wide with the edges rolled under. The lower surface of the leaves is densely covered with cottony white hairs. The flower heads are arranged in a corymb of 70 to 200, each head 1.5–3 mm (0.059–0.118 in) wide with five or six florets surrounded by overlapping white to greenish involucral bracts in five whorls. Flowering occurs from January to March and the achenes are about 0.9–1.1 mm (0.035–0.043 in) long with a bristly pappus 1.5–2 mm (0.059–0.079 in) long.

== Taxonomy and naming ==
Cassinia diminuta was first formally described in 2004 by Anthony Edward Orchard in Australian Systematic Botany from specimens collected in the same year.

== Distribution and habitat ==
This species of Cassinia grows in mallee and woodland in central Victoria.
