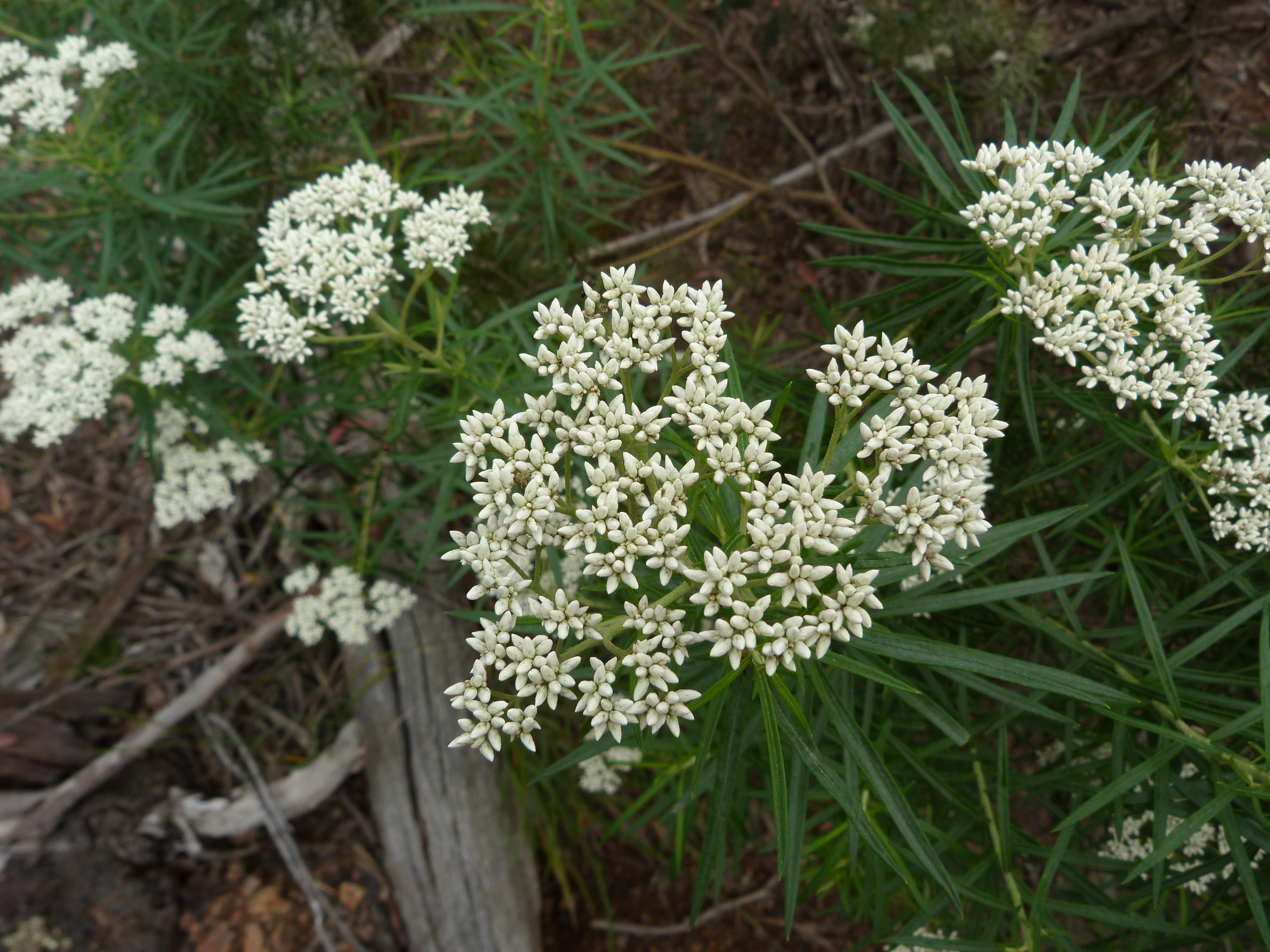
- Cassinia longifolia on Black Mountain

Scientific classification
- Kingdom: Plantae
- Clade: Tracheophytes
- Clade: Angiosperms
- Clade: Eudicots
- Clade: Asterids
- Order: Asterales
- Family: Asteraceae
- Genus: Cassinia
- Species: C. longifolia

Binomial name
- Cassinia longifolia R.Br.

= Cassinia longifolia =

Shiny cassinia

Species of flowering plant

Cassinia longifolia, commonly known as shiny cassinia, is a species of flowering plant in the family Asteraceae and is endemic to eastern Australia. It is an erect, aromatic shrub with sticky, hairy foliage, linear or oblong to narrow lance-shaped leaves, and heads of creamy-white flowers arranged in a dense corymb.

== Description ==
Cassinia longifolia is an erect, aromatic shrub that typically grows to a height of 1.2–2.5 m (3 ft 11 in – 8 ft 2 in), its foliage covered with short, glandular hairs and sticky. The leaves are linear or oblong to narrow lance-shaped, 15–95 mm (0.59–3.74 in) long and 2–6 mm (0.079–0.236 in) wide on a petiole 0.5–1 mm (0.020–0.039 in) long. The upper surface of the leaves is glabrous, the edges curve downwards and the lower surface is covered with fine hairs. The flower heads are 2–3 mm (0.079–0.118 in) long and 1.0–1.5 mm (0.039–0.059 in) wide, each with five or six creamy-white florets surrounded by three to five overlapping rows of egg-shaped involucral bracts. The heads are arranged in a dense corymb up to 200 mm (7.9 in) in diameter. Flowering occurs in summer and autumn and the achenes are about 0.8 mm (0.031 in) long with a pappus 2–3 mm (0.079–0.118 in) long.

== Taxonomy and naming ==
Cassinia longifolia was first formally described in 1818 by Robert Brown in the Transactions of the Linnean Society of London. The specific epithet (longifolia) means "long-leaved".

== Distribution and habitat ==
Shiny cassinia grows in forest and disturbed places, especially after fire, and often on ridges. It occurs in south-eastern New South Wales, the Australian Capital Territory and is widespread and common in eastern Victoria.
