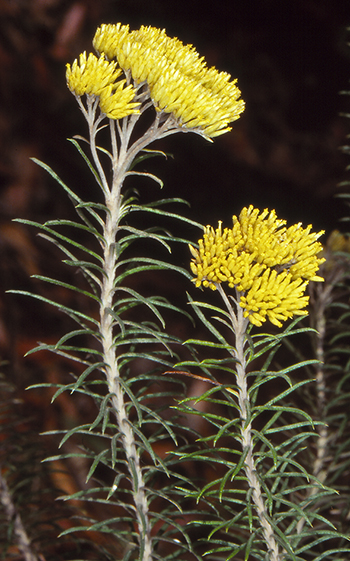

Scientific classification
- Kingdom: Plantae
- Clade: Tracheophytes
- Clade: Angiosperms
- Clade: Eudicots
- Clade: Asterids
- Order: Asterales
- Family: Asteraceae
- Genus: Cassinia
- Species: C. cunninghamii

Binomial name
- Cassinia cunninghamii DC.

Synonyms
- Cassinia patens DC. nom. inval., pro syn.; Helichrysum cunninghamii (DC.) Benth.

= Cassinia cunninghamii =

Species of flowering plant

Cassinia cunninghamii, commonly known as Cunninghams everlasting, is a plant native to central New South Wales in eastern Australia.

== Description ==
Cassinia cunninghamii is a small shrub 1–2 m (3 ft 3 in – 6 ft 7 in) high with woolly stems and whitish hairs. The leaves are crowded on the stems 20–35 mm (0.79–1.38 in) long and 1–1.5 mm (0.039–0.059 in) wide, the edges rolled under and ending in a sharp point at the tip. The leaf upper surface is dark green and rough with fine short hairs. The underside densely covered with long white matted hairs. The inflorescence is a thick corymb 2–8 cm (0.79–3.15 in) in diameter, each yellow flower about 3 mm (0.12 in) long and about 1 mm (0.039 in) in diameter. The overlapping bracts are in longitudinal rows of 3 or 4, broadly rounded and translucent brown. The dry, one seeded fruit are 0.5 mm (0.020 in) long and smooth.

== Taxonomy and naming ==
Cassinia cunninghamii was first formally described in 1838 by Augustin Pyramus de Candolle and the description was published in Prodromus Systematis Naturalis Regni Vegetabilis. The specific epithet cunninghamii honours the botanical collector Allan Cunningham.

== Distribution and habitat ==
Cunninghams everlasting grows on sandstone in dry sclerophyll forest mostly from the upper Hunter Region to Nowra and west to Newnes in New South Wales.
