= Cassinia furtiva =

Scientific classification
- Kingdom: Plantae
- Clade: Tracheophytes
- Clade: Angiosperms
- Clade: Eudicots
- Clade: Asterids
- Order: Asterales
- Family: Asteraceae
- Genus: Cassinia
- Species: C. furtiva

Binomial name
- Cassinia furtiva Orchard

Species of flowering plant

Cassinia furtiva is a species of flowering plant in the family Asteraceae and is endemic to a restricted area of New South Wales. It is a shrub with hairy, sticky stems, narrow linear leaves and 100 to 150 flower heads arranged in a rounded dichasium.

== Description ==
Cassinia furtiva is a shrub that typically grows to a height of 1.5 m (4 ft 11 in) with its branchlets covered with glandular hairs embedded in a sticky resin. The leaves are narrow linear, 10–25 mm (0.39–0.98 in) long and about 0.7 mm (0.028 in) wide with the edges rolled under. The upper surface of the leaves is glabrous and the lower surface of the leaves is densely covered with cottony white hairs. The flower heads are arranged in a dichasium of 100 to 150, each head with five florets surrounded by overlapping membranous involucral bracts in two or three whorls. The achenes are 0.8–0.9 mm (0.031–0.035 in) long with a bristly pappus of 18 to 21 bristles.

== Taxonomy and naming ==
Cassinia furtiva was first formally described in 2006 by Anthony Edward Orchard in Australian Systematic Botany from specimens collected 10 km (6.2 mi) north-west of Warialda in 1988. The specific epithet (furtiva) means "hidden" or "elusive", referring to the lack of success in rediscovering this species after its discovery.

== Distribution and habitat ==
This species of Cassinia is only known from the type specimen that was growing in shrubby woodland in hilly country.
