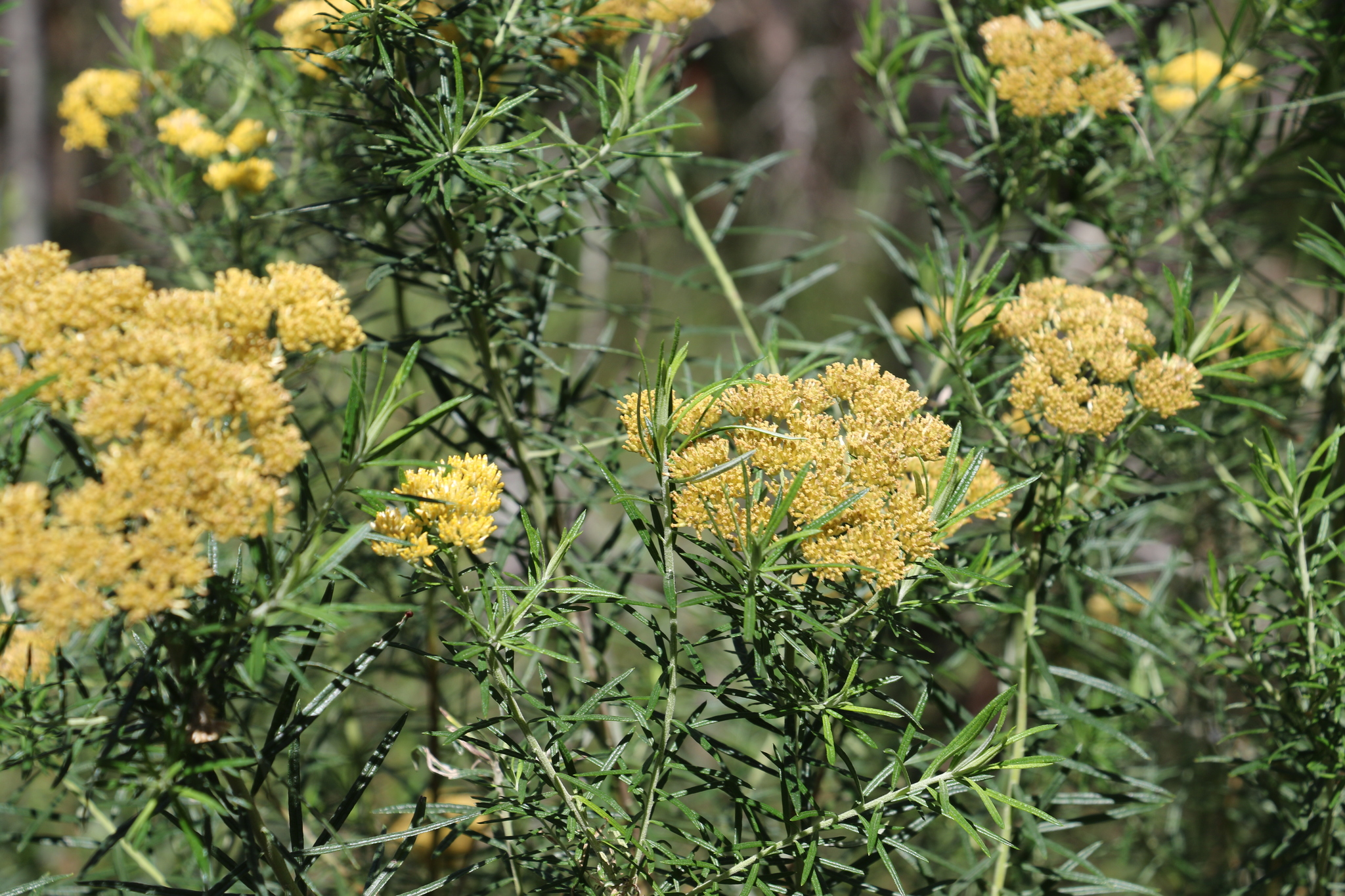

Scientific classification
- Kingdom: Plantae
- Clade: Tracheophytes
- Clade: Angiosperms
- Clade: Eudicots
- Clade: Asterids
- Order: Asterales
- Family: Asteraceae
- Genus: Cassinia
- Species: C. straminea

Binomial name
- Cassinia straminea (Benth.) Orchard

= Cassinia straminea =

Species of flowering plant

Cassinia straminea is a species of flowering plant in the family Asteraceae and is endemic to eastern Australia. It is an erect shrub with hairy young stems, linear leaves and corymbs of up to several hundred flower heads.

== Description ==
Cassinia straminea is an erect shrub that typically grows to a height of 1.8–2 m (5 ft 11 in – 6 ft 7 in) with its young stems straw-coloured to reddish-brown and densely covered with cottony hairs. The leaves are linear, 20–65 mm (0.79–2.56 in) long and 1–4 mm (0.039–0.157 in) wide. The upper surface of the leaves is glabrous, the edges are rolled under and the lower surface is densely covered with cottony hairs. The flower heads are 2.5–3.5 mm (0.098–0.138 in) long on a pedicel 1.0–1.5 mm (0.039–0.059 in) long, each head with four to six yellow florets surrounded by about 12 overlapping involucral bracts. Up to several hundred heads are arranged in each corymb. Flowering occurs from October to February and the achenes are about 0.7 mm (0.028 in) long with a pappus of 18 to 21 bristles.

== Taxonomy and naming ==
This species was first formally described in 1867 by George Bentham who gave it the name Cassinia longifolia var. straminea in Flora Australiensis. In 2004, Anthony Edward Orchard raised the variety to species status as Cassinia straminea in Australian Systematic Botany.

== Distribution ==
Cassinia straminea grows in forest and on the edges of rainforest on the Northern Tablelands of New South Wales and in south-east Queensland.
