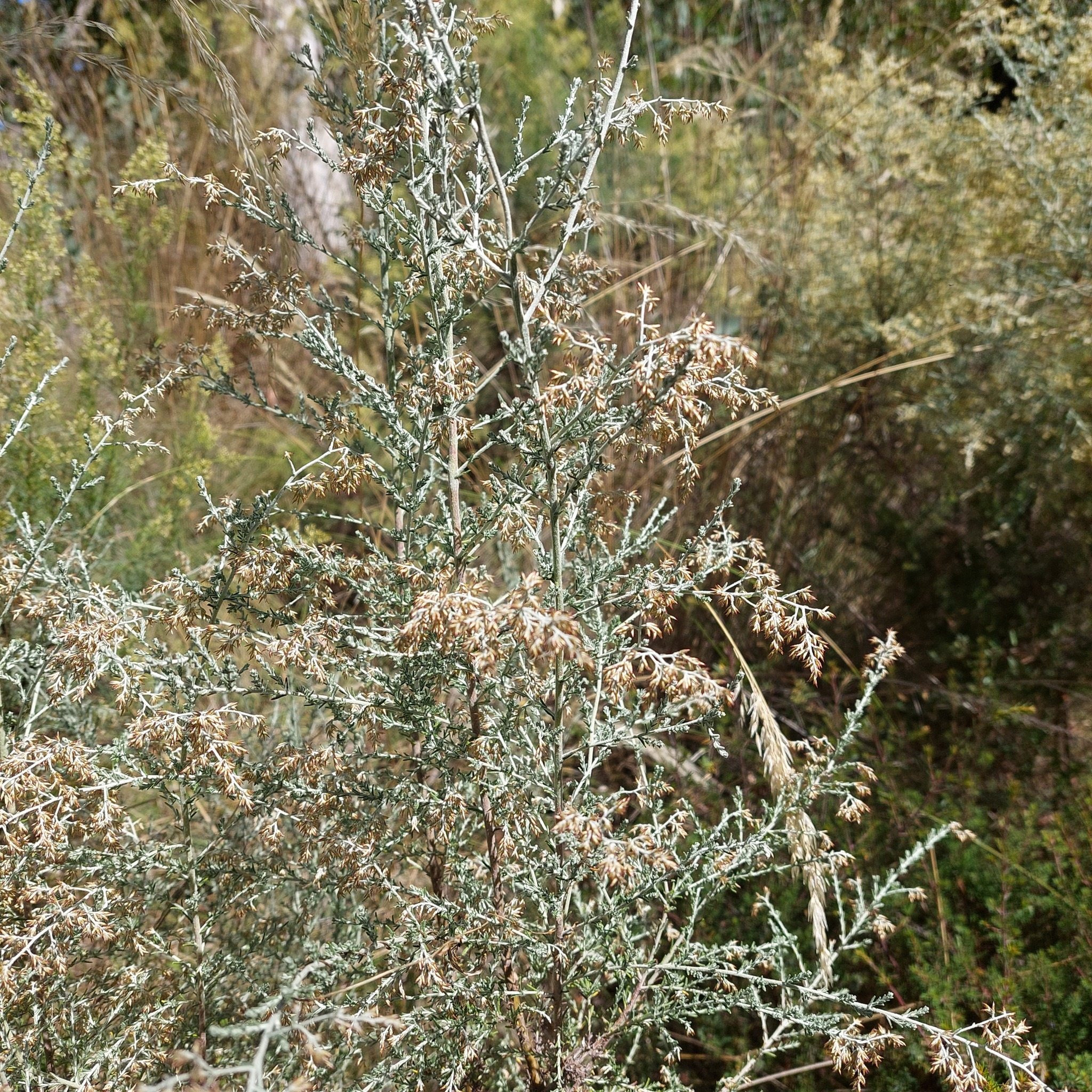

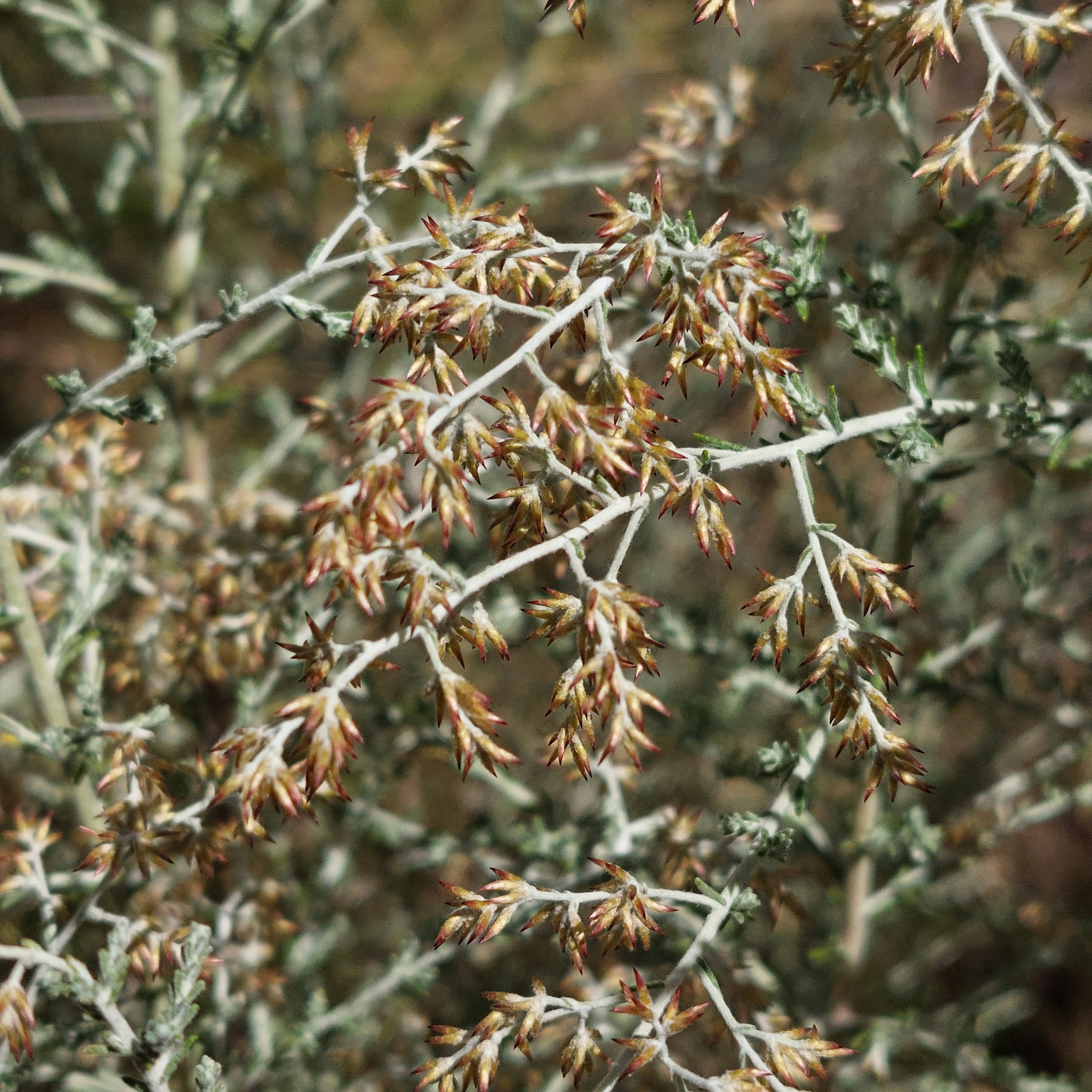
- Mount Kaputar, NSW, May 17, 2023

Scientific classification
- Kingdom: Plantae
- Clade: Tracheophytes
- Clade: Angiosperms
- Clade: Eudicots
- Clade: Asterids
- Order: Asterales
- Family: Asteraceae
- Genus: Cassinia
- Species: C. theodori

Binomial name
- Cassinia theodori F.Muell.{

= Cassinia theodori =

Species of flowering plant

Cassinia theodori is a species of flowering plant in the family Asteraceae, and was first described in 1866 by Ferdinand von Mueller, from a specimen collected by Ludwig Leichhardt.

It flowers in summer.

== Distribution & habitat ==
Cassinia theodori is found in sclerophyll forests on volcanic soils, and is restricted to the higher altitudes of the Nandewar Range.
