= Cassinia nivalis =

Ochre cassinia

Scientific classification
- Kingdom: Plantae
- Clade: Tracheophytes
- Clade: Angiosperms
- Clade: Eudicots
- Clade: Asterids
- Order: Asterales
- Family: Asteraceae
- Genus: Cassinia
- Species: C. nivalis

Binomial name
- Cassinia nivalis Orchard

Species of flowering plant

Cassinia nivalis commonly known as ochre cassinia, is a species of flowering plant in the family Asteraceae and is endemic to eastern Victoria, Australia. It is an erect shrub with hairy, deep reddish-purple branches, hairy, needle-shaped leaves, and cream-coloured to ochre heads of flowers arranged in a hemispherical corymb.

== Description ==
Cassinia nivalis is an erect shrub that typically grows to a height of 1–2 m (3 ft 3 in – 6 ft 7 in), its branches deep reddish-purple and hairy. The leaves are needle-shaped, 15–25 mm (0.59–0.98 in) long and 0.5–0.7 mm (0.020–0.028 in) wide, the upper surface of the leaves glossy green, the edges rolled under and the lower surface densely covered with white, cottony hairs. The flower heads are cream to ochre-coloured, 3.5–5 mm (0.14–0.20 in) long, each head usually with five florets surrounded by fourteen to eighteen overlapping involucral bracts. The corymbs are hemispherical 10–100 mm (0.39–3.94 in) in diameter with between eighty and one hundred heads. Flowering occurs from January to April and the achenes are ribbed, reddish-brown, 0.8–1.0 mm (0.031–0.039 in) long with a pappus 2–3 mm (0.079–0.118 in) long.

== Taxonomy and naming ==
Cassinia nivalis was first formally described in 2005 by Anthony Edward Orchard in Australian Systematic Botany from specimens collected by Cliff Beauglehole in the Barkly-Goulburn State Forest in 1985. The specific epithet (nivalis) means "snowy".

== Distribution and habitat ==
Ochre cassinia grows in mountain forest and coastal woodland in eastern Victoria.
