= Cassinia copensis =

Scientific classification
- Kingdom: Plantae
- Clade: Tracheophytes
- Clade: Angiosperms
- Clade: Eudicots
- Clade: Asterids
- Order: Asterales
- Family: Asteraceae
- Genus: Cassinia
- Species: C. copensis

Binomial name
- Cassinia copensis Orchard

Species of flowering plant

Cassinia copensis is a species of flowering plant in the family Asteraceae and is endemic to eastern Australia. It is an erect, multi-stemmed shrub with aromatic, cylindrical leaves, and heads of creamy-white flowers arranged in a flattened corymb.

== Description ==
Cassinia copensis is an erect, multi-stemmed shrub that typically grows to a height of 1–2.5 m (3 ft 3 in – 8 ft 2 in) and is strongly aromatic. The leaves are cylindrical 30–40 mm (1.2–1.6 in) long and about 1 mm (0.039 in) wide with the edges rolled under. The upper surface of the leaves is sticky with a sunken midrib and the lower surface is densely covered woolly white hairs. The flower heads are about 3.5–5 mm (0.14–0.20 in) long, each with five or six creamy-white florets surrounded by overlapping, opaque involucral bracts. The heads are arranged in a flattened corymb of one hundred to two hundred florets. Flowering occurs in December and the achenes are about 1.9 mm (0.075 in) long with a pappus of about twenty bristles 2.2–2.5 mm (0.087–0.098 in) long.

== Taxonomy and naming ==
Cassinia copensis was first formally described in 2004 by Anthony Edward Orchard in Australian Systematic Botany from specimens he collected near Copes Creek on the road between Bundarra and Inverell in 2004.

== Distribution and habitat ==
This species of Cassinia grows in forest and woodland in the watershed of Copes Creek in New South Wales and near Wallangarra in Queensland, near the border with New South Wales.
