= Cassinia ozothamnoides =

Scientific classification
- Kingdom: Plantae
- Clade: Tracheophytes
- Clade: Angiosperms
- Clade: Eudicots
- Clade: Asterids
- Order: Asterales
- Family: Asteraceae
- Genus: Cassinia
- Species: C. ozothamnoides

Binomial name
- Cassinia ozothamnoides Orchard

Species of flowering plant

Cassinia ozothamnoides, commonly known as cottony haeckeria, is a species of flowering plant in the family Asteraceae and is endemic to Victoria, Australia. It is an erect shrub with hairy branchlets, linear leaves and corymbs of up to two hundred flower heads.

== Description ==
Cassinia ozothamnoides is an erect shrub that typically grows to a height of up to 2 m (6 ft 7 in) with its branchlets densely covered with woolly white hairs. The leaves are linear, 20–30 mm (0.79–1.18 in) long and about 1.0 mm (0.039 in) wide. The upper surface of the leaves is dark green, the edges rolled under, the lower surface is densely covered with white, woolly hairs and there is a small point on the end. The flower heads are 4–5 mm (0.16–0.20 in) long, each with five or six florets surrounded by 12 to 18 overlapping involucral bracts. Between 50 and 200 heads are arranged in corymbs 50–90 mm (2.0–3.5 in) in diameter. Flowering occurs from October to March and the achenes are 1.0–1.2 mm (0.039–0.047 in) long with a pappus of up to sixteen bristles 1.5–1.8 mm (0.059–0.071 in) long.

== Taxonomy and naming ==
This species was first formally described in 1855 by Ferdinand von Mueller who gave it the name Haeckeria ozothamnoides in his Definitions of rare or hitherto undescribed Australian plants. In 2004, Anthony Edward Orchard changed the name to Cassinia ozothamnoides in Australian Systematic Botany. The specific epithet (ozothamnoides) means "Ozothamnus-like".

== Distribution ==
Cassinia ozothamnoides grows in open forest at altitudes from 170 to 300 m (560 to 980 ft) in central Victoria, often in disturbed sites.
