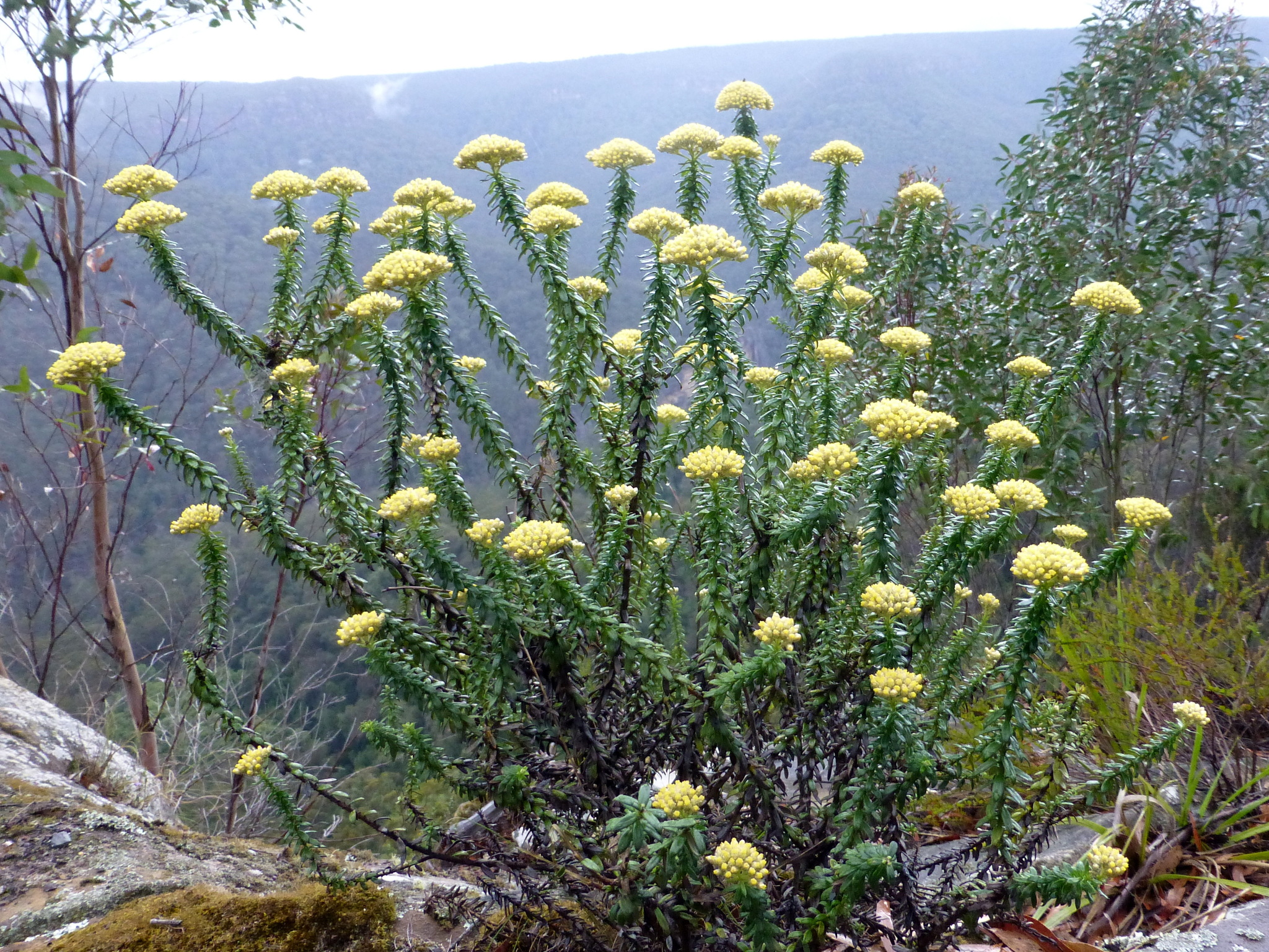
- Cassinia denticulata at Bundanoon

Scientific classification
- Kingdom: Plantae
- Clade: Tracheophytes
- Clade: Angiosperms
- Clade: Eudicots
- Clade: Asterids
- Order: Asterales
- Family: Asteraceae
- Genus: Cassinia
- Species: C. denticulata

Binomial name
- Cassinia denticulata R.Br.

Synonyms
- Cassinia berberifolia A.Cunn. ex DC. nom. inval., pro syn.

= Cassinia denticulata =

Stiff cassinia

Species of flowering plant

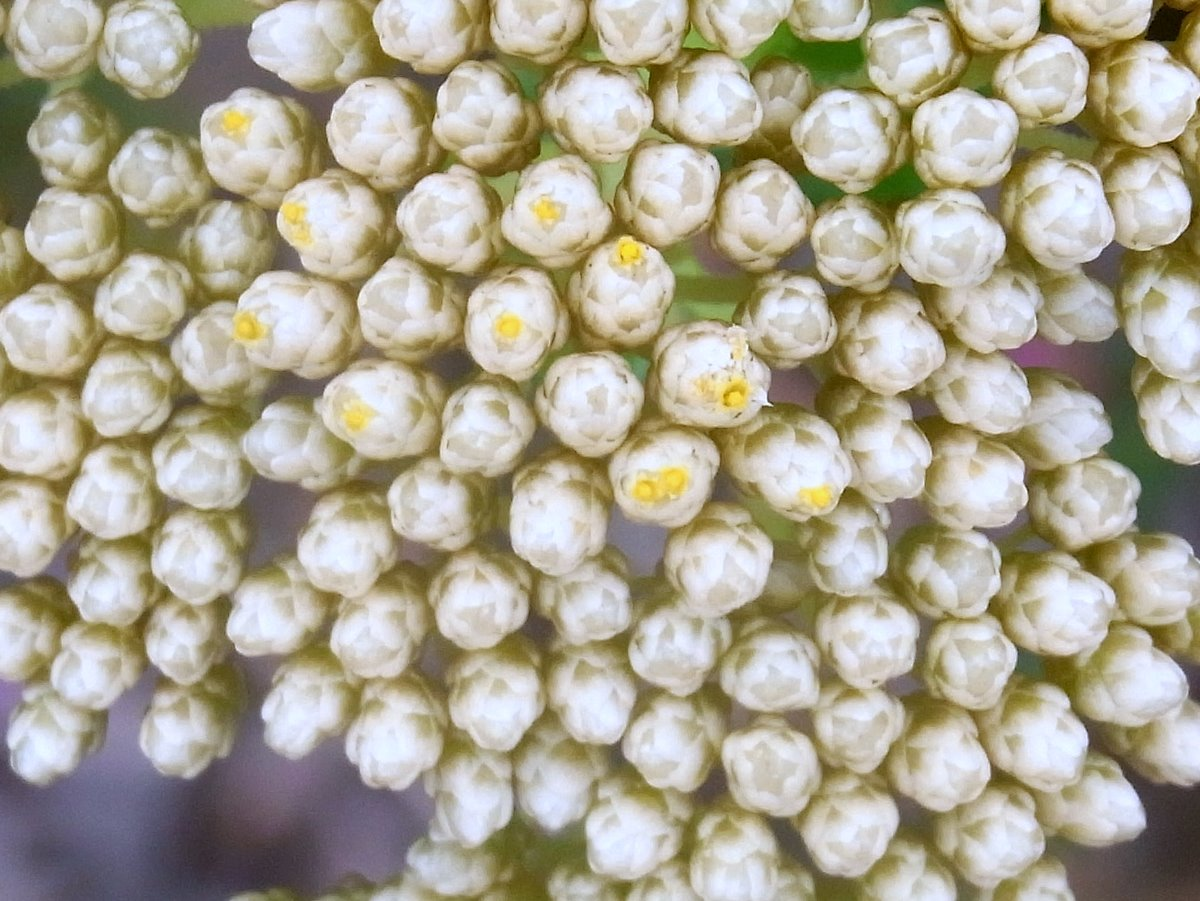
Close-up of the flowers at Ku-ring-gai Chase National Park

Cassinia denticulata, commonly known as stiff cassinia, is a species of flowering plant in the family Asteraceae and is endemic to eastern New South Wales. It is a shrub with yellowish stems, finely-toothed, egg-shaped to elliptic leaves, and heads of pale yellow flowers arranged in a dense corymb.

== Description ==
Cassinia denticulata is a shrub that typically grows to a height of 0.7–2 m (2 ft 4 in – 6 ft 7 in) and has yellowish stems loosely covered with glandular hairs. The leaves are egg-shaped to elliptic, 8–25 mm (0.31–0.98 in) long and 3–6 mm (0.12–0.24 in) wide with finely-toothed edges. The upper surface of the leaves is glossy dark green and sticky, the lower surface paler and covered with sticky hairs. The flower heads are 2–4 mm (0.079–0.157 in) long and wide, each with twelve to fourteen pale yellow florets surrounded by four or five rows of involucral bracts. The heads are arranged in a dense corymb of florets. Flowering occurs from spring to early summer and the achenes are about 0.6 mm (0.024 in) long with a pappus 2–2.5 mm (0.079–0.098 in) long.

== Taxonomy and naming ==
Cassinia denticulata was first formally described in 1818 by Robert Brown in Transactions of the Linnean Society of London. The specific epithet means "finely toothed".

== Distribution and habitat ==
Stiff cassinia grows in heath and woodland on sandstone and sandy soils, mainly from the Hawkesbury River to Fitzroy Falls including the Sydney area and the Blue Mountains.
