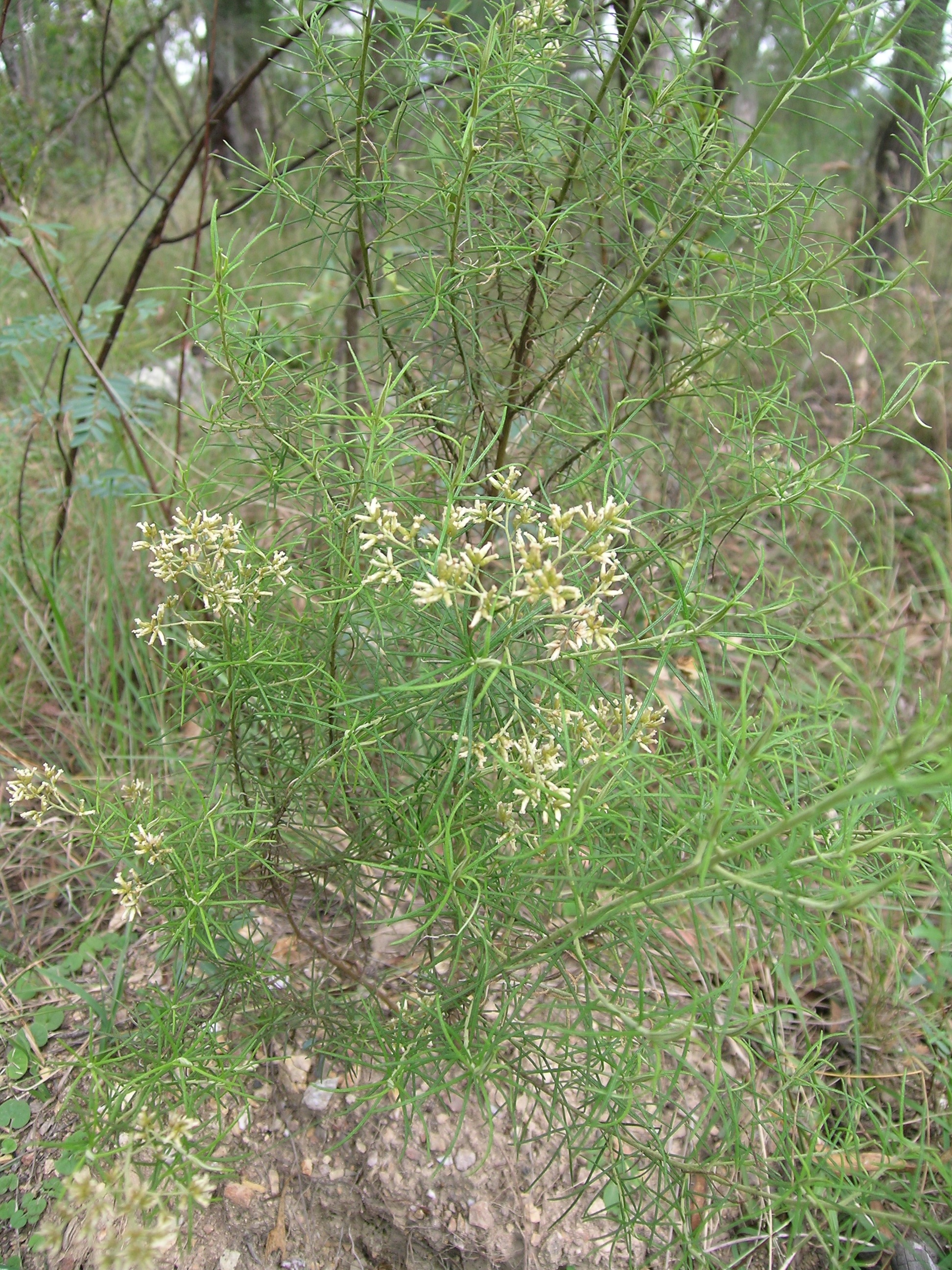

Scientific classification
- Kingdom: Plantae
- Clade: Tracheophytes
- Clade: Angiosperms
- Clade: Eudicots
- Clade: Asterids
- Order: Asterales
- Family: Asteraceae
- Genus: Cassinia
- Species: C. laevis

Binomial name
- Cassinia laevis R.Br.

Synonyms
- Calea aculeata var laevis(R.Br.) J.M.Black; Cassinia rosmarinifolia A.Cunn. ex DC.

= Cassinia laevis =

Species of flowering plant

Cassinia laevis, commonly known as cough bush, dead finish, curry bush or rosemary bush, is a species of flowering plant in the family Asteraceae and is endemic to south-eastern continental Australia. It is a shrub with a curry-like odour, crowded linear leaves, and heads of creamy-white flowers arranged in panicles.

== Description ==
Cassinia laevis is a shrub that typically grows to a height of 1.5–3 m (4 ft 11 in – 9 ft 10 in), has erect, densely branched stems and a curry-like odour. The leaves are crowded, linear, 10–50 mm (0.39–1.97 in) long and about 1.0 mm (0.039 in) wide. The upper surface of the leaves is shiny but the lower surface has fine hairs although obscured by the rolled edges of the leaf. The flower heads are 3–4 mm (0.12–0.16 in) long and 1–2 mm (0.039–0.079 in) wide, arranged in pyramid-shaped panicles 50–100 mm (2.0–3.9 in) in diameter, each head with two to four creamy-white florets surrounded by involucral bracts in four or five whorls. Flowering occurs spring and autumn and the achenes are about 0.8 mm (0.031 in) long with a pappus about 2.5 mm (0.098 in) long.

== Taxonomy ==
Cassinia laevis was first formally described in 1818 by Robert Brown in the Transactions of the Linnean Society of London. The specific epithet (aculeata) means "smooth".

== Distribution and habitat ==
Cassinia laevis is widespread in Queensland, New South Wales and eastern South Australia. There are also records from the Northern Territory. It grows in a wide variety of habitats, often on stony ridges and often in mallee.
