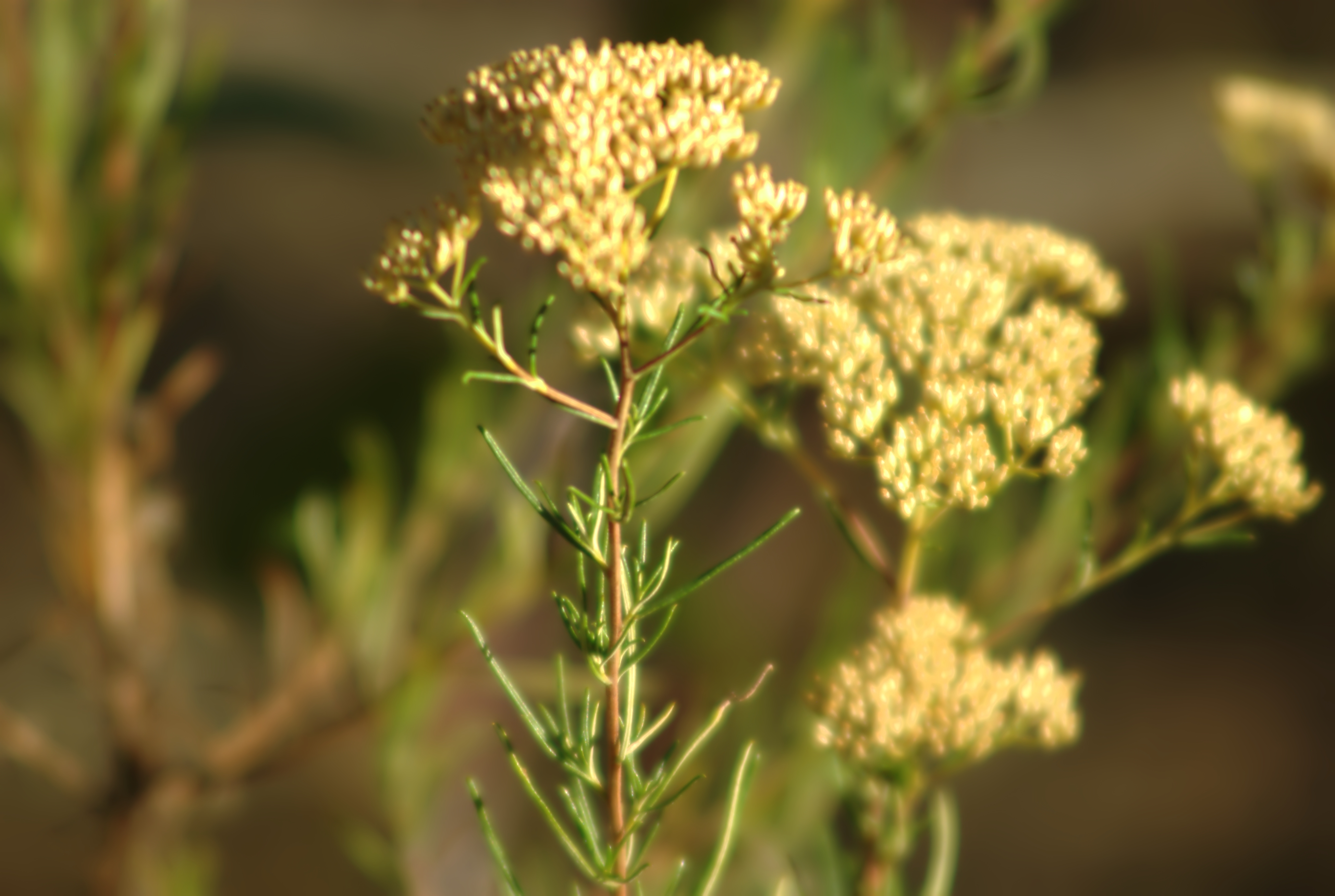

Scientific classification
- Kingdom: Plantae
- Clade: Tracheophytes
- Clade: Angiosperms
- Clade: Eudicots
- Clade: Asterids
- Order: Asterales
- Family: Asteraceae
- Genus: Cassinia
- Species: C. scabrida

Binomial name
- Cassinia scabrida Orchard

= Cassinia scabrida =

Rough cassinia

Species of flowering plant

Cassinia scabrida commonly known as rough cassinia, is a species of flowering plant in the family Asteraceae, and is endemic north-eastern Victoria, where it grows in forests with rocky granite outcrops. It is an erect shrub with hairy foliage, linear leaves, and many greenish-white heads of flowers arranged in dense corymbs.

== Description ==
Cassinia scabrida is an erect shrub that typically grows to a height of up to 2 m (6 ft 7 in), its branches covered with cottony and glandular hairs. The leaves are linear, 55–65 mm (2.2–2.6 in) long and 4–5 mm (0.16–0.20 in) wide, the edges rolled under. The flower heads are 4.2–4.5 mm (0.17–0.18 in) long, pale greenish white, each head with four or five creamy-white florets surrounded by ten to fifteen overlapping involucral bracts. The heads are arranged in groups of hundred to thousands in corymbs 95–115 mm (3.7–4.5 in) in diameter. Flowering occurs from November to February and the achenes are 1.0–1.2 mm (0.039–0.047 in) long, usually lacking a pappus.

== Taxonomy and naming ==
Cassinia scabrida was first formally described in 2004 by Anthony Edward Orchard in Australian Systematic Botany from specimens collected near Corryong in 2004. The specific epithet (scabrida) means "somewhat rough".

== Distribution and habitat ==
Rough cassinia grows in the shrubby understorey of forests, near granite outcrops in mountain areas of north-eastern Victoria.
