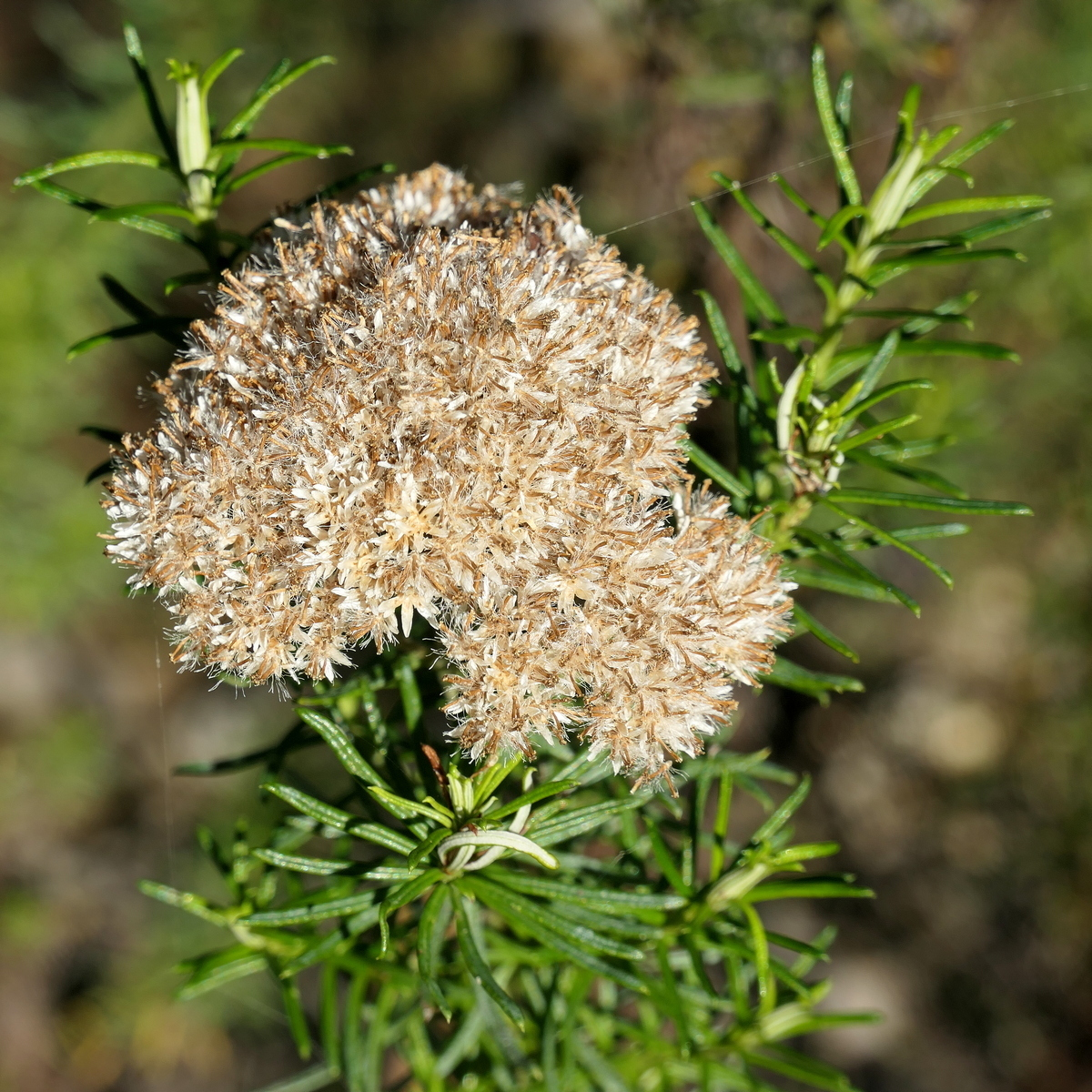

Scientific classification
- Kingdom: Plantae
- Clade: Tracheophytes
- Clade: Angiosperms
- Clade: Eudicots
- Clade: Asterids
- Order: Asterales
- Family: Asteraceae
- Genus: Cassinia
- Species: C. maritima

Binomial name
- Cassinia maritima Orchard

= Cassinia maritima =

Coast cassinia

Species of flowering plant

Cassinia maritima commonly known as coast cassinia, is a species of flowering plant in the family Asteraceae and is endemic to coastal areas of south-eastern Australia. It is an erect shrub with glandular hairs embedded in a sticky layer on its branches and leaves, needle-shaped leaves, and white to yellowish heads of flowers arranged in a flat-topped corymb.

== Description ==
Cassinia maritima is an erect shrub that typically grows to a height of 0.3–3.0 m (1 ft 0 in – 9 ft 10 in), its foliage covered with glandular hairs embedded in a sticky layer. The leaves are needle-shaped, 25–45 mm (0.98–1.77 in) long and 0.8–0.9 mm (0.031–0.035 in) wide with a curved tip. The upper surface of the leaves is sticky, the edges rolled under and the lower surface densely hairy. The flower heads are 4.5–5 mm (0.18–0.20 in) long and 2–3 mm (0.079–0.118 in) wide and white to yellowish, the florets surrounded by five overlapping rows of involucral bracts. The heads are arranged in groups of several hundred in a flat-topped corymb 50–120 mm (2.0–4.7 in) in diameter. Flowering occurs from January to March and the achenes are 1.0–1.2 mm (0.039–0.047 in) long with a pappus of twelve to sixteen bristles.

== Taxonomy and naming ==
Cassinia maritima was first formally described in 2004 by Anthony Edward Orchard in Australian Systematic Botany from specimens collected by near the Cann River in 2004. The specific epithet (maritima) means "growing by the sea".

== Distribution and habitat ==
Coast cassinia grows in the shrub layer of scrub and forest in near-coastal areas from Eden in south-eastern New South Wales to far far north-eastern Victoria.
