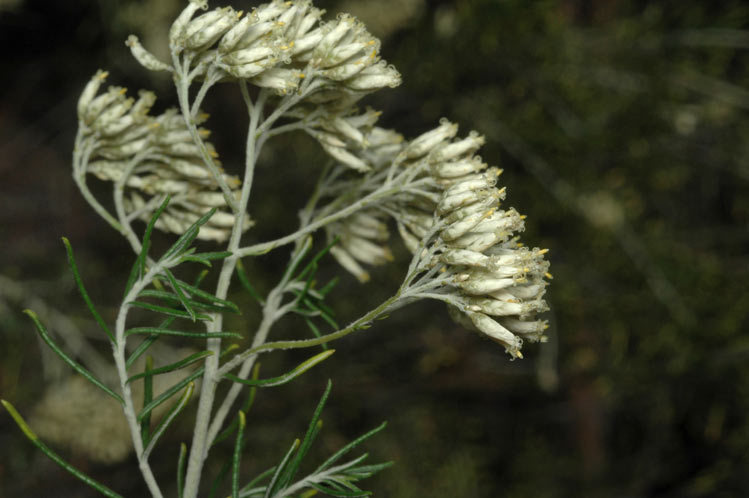
- In the Australian National Botanic Gardens

Scientific classification
- Kingdom: Plantae
- Clade: Tracheophytes
- Clade: Angiosperms
- Clade: Eudicots
- Clade: Asterids
- Order: Asterales
- Family: Asteraceae
- Genus: Cassinia
- Species: C. wilsoniae

Binomial name
- Cassinia wilsoniae Orchard

= Cassinia wilsoniae =

Species of flowering plant

Cassinia wilsoniae is a species of flowering plant in the family Asteraceae and is endemic to a small area near the border between South Australia and Victoria. It is an erect shrub with densely hairy branchlets, needle-shaped leaves, and corymbs of twenty to fifty ochre-coloured flower heads.

== Description ==
Cassinia wilsoniae is an erect shrub that typically grows to a height of 0.75–1.8 m (2 ft 6 in – 5 ft 11 in) with its branchlets densely covered with woolly or cottony hairs. The leaves are needle-shaped, 10–20 mm (0.39–0.79 in) long and 0.7 mm (0.028 in) wide. The upper surface of the leaves is yellowish-green and more or lass glabrous and the lower surface is densely covered with cottony hairs. The flower heads are ochre-coloured, 3–4 mm (0.12–0.16 in) long and 2–3 mm (0.079–0.118 in) wide, each head with up to six florets surrounded by fifteen to eighteen involucral bracts 2–3 mm (0.079–0.118 in) long. Mostly between twenty and fifty heads are arranged in corymbs 20–70 mm (0.79–2.76 in) in diameter. Flowering occurs from February to April and the achenes are about 0.5 mm (0.020 in) long and with a pappus about 0.5 mm (0.020 in) long.

== Taxonomy and naming ==
Cassinia wilsoniae was first formally described in 2009 by Anthony Edward Orchard in Australian Systematic Botany from specimens collected in Wyperfeld National Park in 2004.

== Distribution ==
Cassinia wilsoniae is only known from Wyperfeld National Park, Lake Albacutya and a single collection in South Australia.
