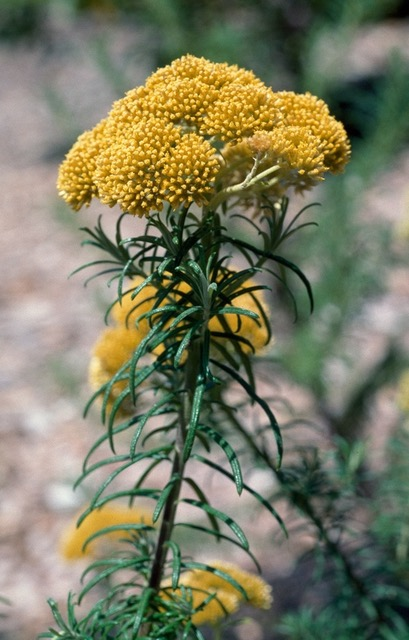

Scientific classification
- Kingdom: Plantae
- Clade: Tracheophytes
- Clade: Angiosperms
- Clade: Eudicots
- Clade: Asterids
- Order: Asterales
- Family: Asteraceae
- Genus: Cassinia
- Species: C. decipiens

Binomial name
- Cassinia decipiens Orchard

= Cassinia decipiens =

Goulburn River everlasting

Species of flowering plant

Cassinia decipiens commonly known as Goulburn River everlasting is a species of flowering plant in the family Asteraceae and grows in New South Wales. It is a shrub with woolly-hairy young twigs, spreading, cylindrical leaves, and heads of creamy-brown to yellowish flowers arranged in a rounded cyme.

== Description ==
Cassinia decipiens is a shrub that typically grows to a height of 1.5–1.9 m (4 ft 11 in – 6 ft 3 in) and has woolly-hairy young twigs and flaky, reddish-brown bark on older branches. The leaves spread at 90° to the stem and are cylindrical 10–20 mm (0.39–0.79 in) long and about 1 mm (0.039 in) wide with the edges rolled under. The upper surface of the leaves is glossy dark green and the lower surface is hidden by the rolled edges. The flower heads are about 3.0–3.5 mm (0.12–0.14 in) long, each with creamy-brown to yellowish florets surrounded by overlapping, papery involucral bracts. The heads are arranged in a rounded cyme of several hundred florets. The achenes are pale brown, about 0.8 mm (0.031 in) long with a pappus of eighteen to twenty-three barbed bristles.

== Taxonomy and naming ==
Cassinia decipiens was first formally described in 2004 by Anthony Edward Orchard in Australian Systematic Botany from specimens he collected near Rylstone in 2004. The specific epithet (decipiens) means deceiving.

== Distribution and habitat ==
This species of Cassinia grows on sandy soils in forest and woodland in a small area between Goulburn River and Rylstone on the Central Western Slopes of New South Wales.
