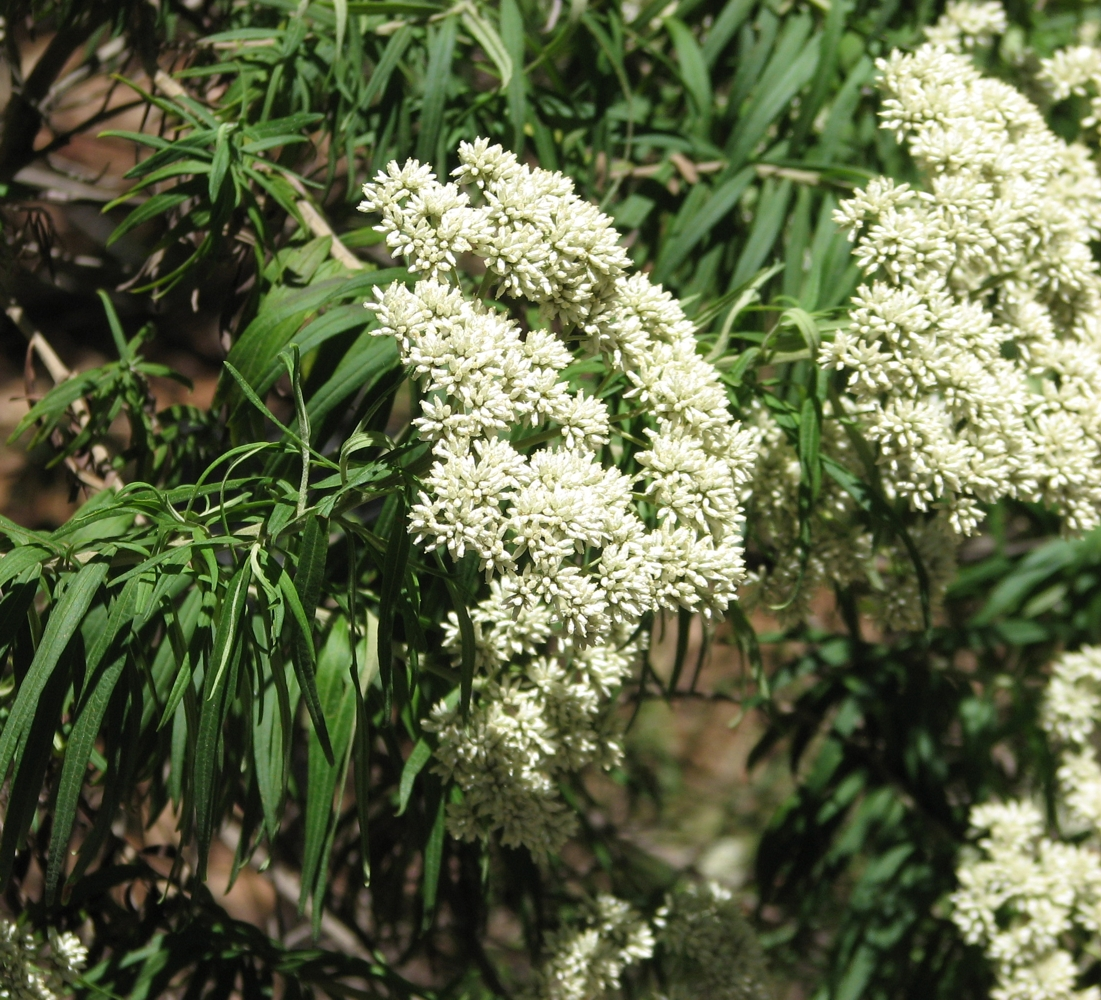
- Cassinia trinerva

Scientific classification
- Kingdom: Plantae
- Clade: Tracheophytes
- Clade: Angiosperms
- Clade: Eudicots
- Clade: Asterids
- Order: Asterales
- Family: Asteraceae
- Subfamily: Asteroideae
- Tribe: Gnaphalieae
- Genus: Cassinia; R.Br. nom. cons.

Synonyms
- Achromolaena Cass. nom. alt.; Chromochiton Cass.; Helichrysum sect. Cassinia (R.Br.) Baill.

= Cassinia =

Genus of flowering plants

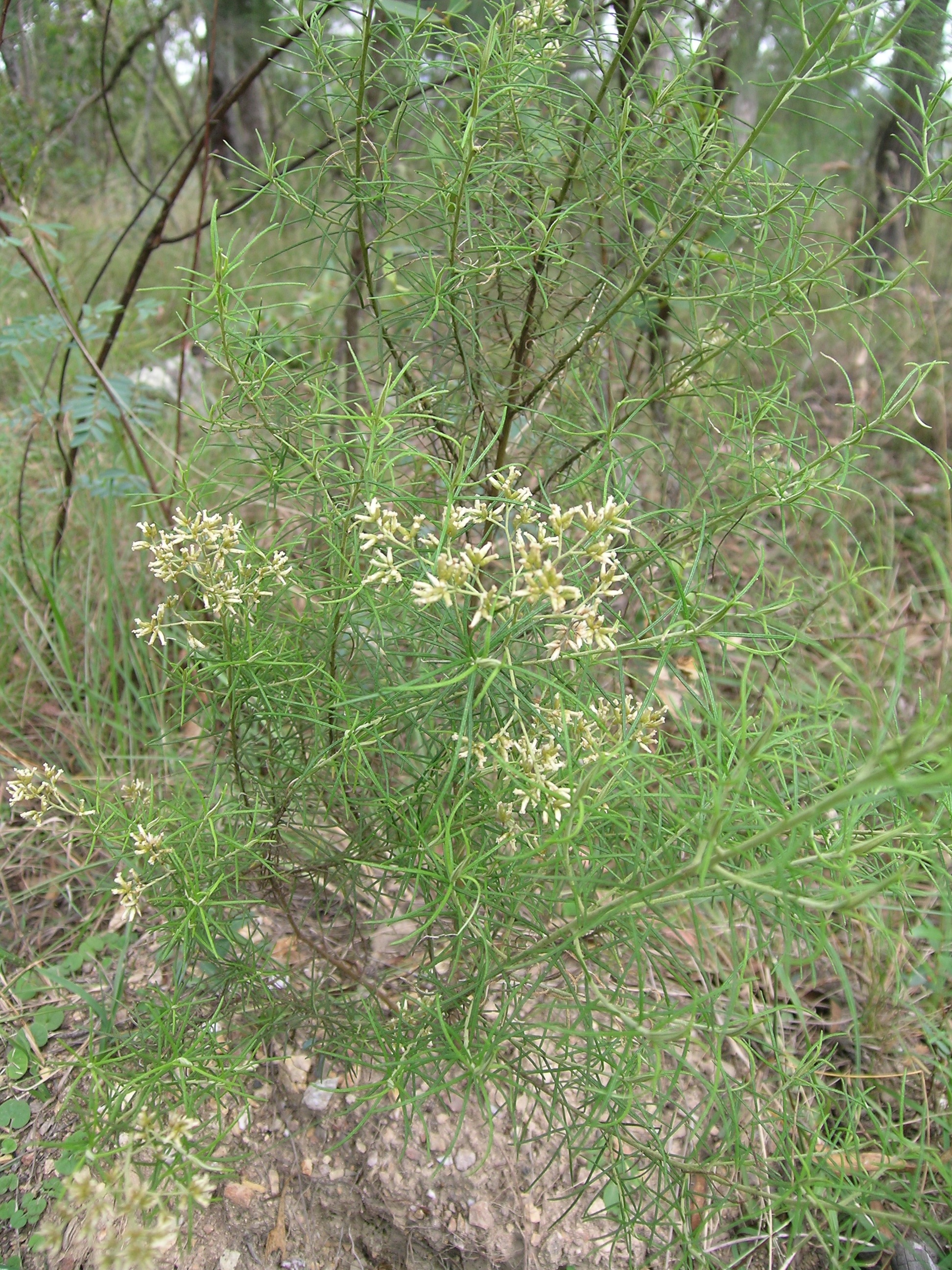
Cough bush (Cassinia laevis), Northern Tablelands, NSW

Cassinia is a genus of about fifty-two species of flowering plants in the family Asteraceae that are native to Australia and New Zealand. Plants in the genus Cassinia are shrubs, sometimes small trees with leaves arranged alternately, and heads of white, cream-coloured, yellow or pinkish flowers surrounded by several rows of bracts.

== Description ==
Plants in the genus Cassinia are shrubs or small trees, sometimes with sticky foliage. The leaves are arranged alternately, the edges flat to strongly rolled under, and the flowers white to cream-coloured, yellow or pinkish, arranged in heads, the heads in cylindrical, top-shaped or bell-shaped corymbs. The heads are surrounded by several rows of usually erect, boat-shaped bracts. The florets are bisexual and cylindrical with five lobes and the cypselas are small and usually have a pappus of bristles.

== Taxonomy ==
The genus Cassinia was first formally described in 1817 by Robert Brown in his book Observations on the Natural Family of Plants called Compositae. Brown had previously used the name Cassinia in the second edition of the Hortus Kewensis but the name was not validly published because no species was described.

The genus was named for French botanist Alexandre de Cassini.

=== Species list ===
The following is a list of species accepted by Plants of the World Online as of May 2021:

- Cassinia accipitrum Orchard (N.S.W.)
- Cassinia aculeata (Labill.) R.Br. – dogwood, common cassinia, dolly bush (N.S.W., S.A., Tas., Vic.)
- Cassinia × adunca F.Muell. (S.A.)
- Cassinia amoena Cheeseman (N.Z.)
- Cassinia × amoenatorta Carse (N.Z.)
- Cassinia arcuata R.Br. – Chinese scrub, drooping cassinia, sifton bush (N.S.W., S.A., W.A., Vic.)
- Cassinia aureonitens N.A.Wakef. – yellow cassinia (N.S.W.)
- Cassinia cinerea Orchard (Qld.)
- Cassinia collina C.T.White (Qld.)
- Cassinia compacta F.Muell. (N.S.W., Qld.)
- Cassinia complanata J.M.Black – smooth cassinia (Vic., S.A.)
- Cassinia copensis Orchard (N.S.W., Qld.)
- Cassinia cunninghamii DC. – Cunninghams everlasting (N.S.W.)
- Cassinia decipiens Orchard (N.S.W.)
- Cassinia denticulata R.Br. – stiff cassinia (N.S.W.)
- Cassinia diminuta Orchard - dwarf cassinia (Vic.)
- Cassinia fulvida Hook.f. (N.Z.)
- Cassinia furtiva Orchard (N.S.W.)
- Cassinia heleniae Orchard (N.S.W.)
- Cassinia hewsoniae Orchard (N.S.W., A.C.T.)
- Cassinia laevis R.Br. – cough bush, dead finish (Qld., N.S.W., A.C.T., Vic.)
- Cassinia lepschii Orchard (N.S.W., Qld.)
- Cassinia leptocephala F.Muell. (N.S.W.)
- Cassinia longifolia R.Br. – shiny cassinia (N.S.W., A.C.T., Vic.)
- Cassinia macrocephala Orchard (N.S.W.)
- Cassinia maritima Orchard (N.S.W., Vic.)
- Cassinia monticola Orchard (N.S.W., Vic.)
- Cassinia nivalis Orchard – ochre cassinia (Vic.)
- Cassinia ochracea Orchard (N.S.W.)
- Cassinia ozothamnoides (F.Muell.) Orchard (Vic.)
- Cassinia petrapendula (Orchard) Orchard (N.S.W.)
- Cassinia quinquefaria R.Br. (N.S.W., Qld., A.C.T.)
- Cassinia retorta A.Cunn. ex DC. (N.Z.)
- Cassinia rugata N.G.Walsh (Vic., S.A., Tas.)
- Cassinia scabrida Orchard – rough cassinia (Vic.)
- Cassinia sifton Orchard (W.A., S.A., N.S.W., A.C.T. (naturalised), Vic. (uncertain origin)
- Cassinia storyi (Orchard) Orchard (N.S.W.)
- Cassinia straminea (Benth.) Orchard (N.S.W)
- Cassinia subtropica F.Muell. – bushy rosemary (Qld., N.S.W.)
- Cassinia tegulata Orchard – Avenue cassinia (S.A.)
- Cassinia telfordii Orchard (N.S.W.)
- Cassinia tenuifolia Benth. – bully bush, killmoke (N.S.W.)
- Cassinia tenuis (Orchard) Orchard (N.S.W)
- Cassinia theodori F.Muell. (N.S.W.)
- Cassinia theresae Orchard (N.S.W.)
- Cassinia thinicola Orchard (N.S.W.)
- Cassinia trinerva N.A.Wakef. (N.S.W., Qld., Vic., Tas.)
- Cassinia uncata A.Cunn. – sticky cassinia (N.S.W., S.A.)
- Cassinia vauvilliersii Hook.f. (N.Z.)
- Cassinia venusta Orchard (N.S.W., Vic.)
- Cassinia wilsoniae Orchard (Vic., S.A.)
- Cassinia wyberbensis Orchard (Qld.)
