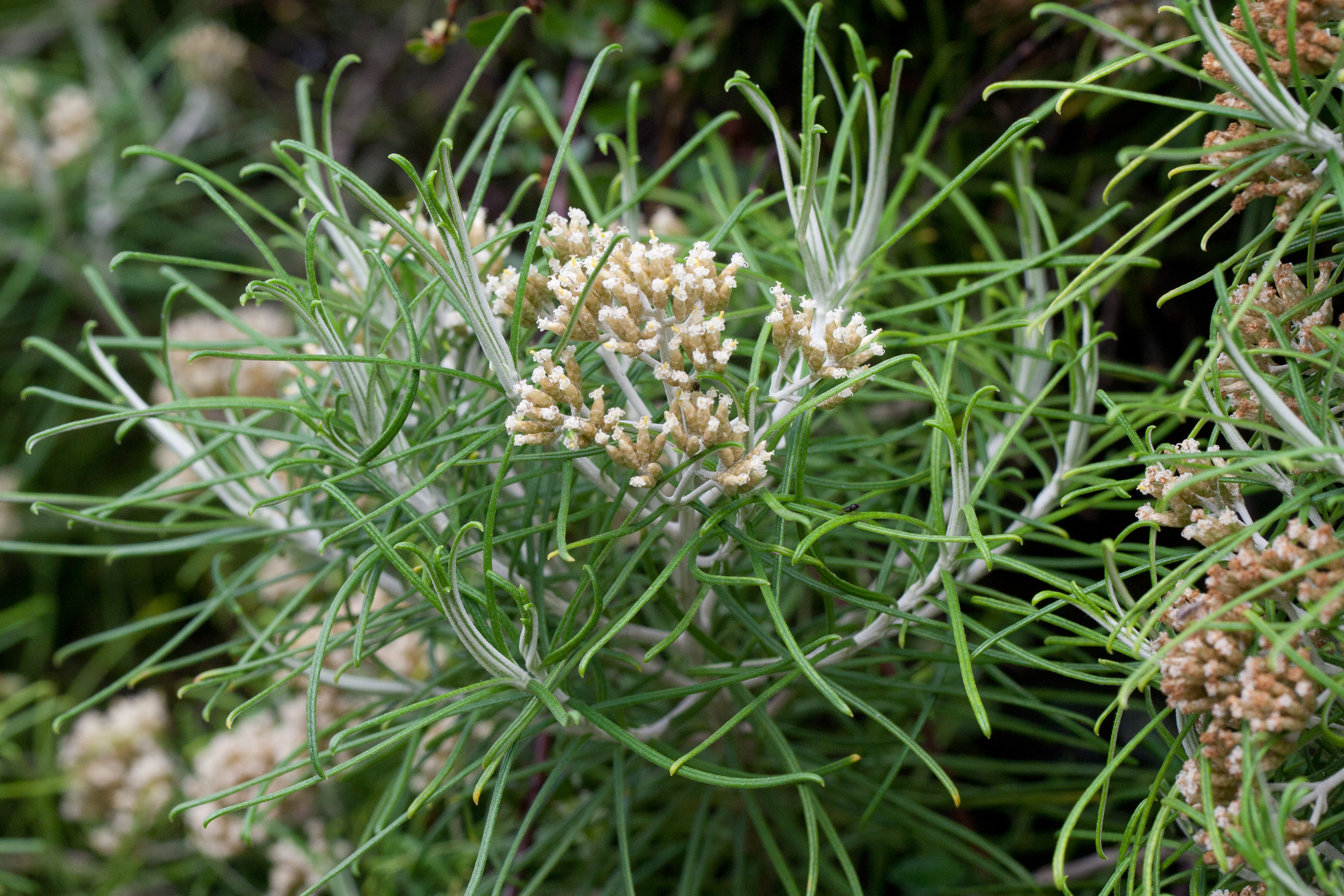
- Cassinia tenuifolia

Scientific classification
- Kingdom: Plantae
- Clade: Tracheophytes
- Clade: Angiosperms
- Clade: Eudicots
- Clade: Asterids
- Order: Asterales
- Family: Asteraceae
- Genus: Cassinia
- Species: C. tenuifolia

Binomial name
- Cassinia tenuifolia Benth.

= Cassinia tenuifolia =

Bully bush

Species of flowering plant

Cassinia tenuifolia, commonly known as bully bush or killmoke, is a species of flowering plant in the family Asteraceae and is endemic to Lord Howe Island. It is a dense, bushy shrub with hairy young stems, crowded linear leaves and sweetly scented flower heads arranged in corymbs.

== Description ==
Cassinia tenuifolia is a dense, bushy shrub that typically grows to a height of up to 2 m (6 ft 7 in) with its young stems densely covered with felt-like hairs. The leaves are more or less crowded, linear, 20–40 mm (0.79–1.57 in) long and 1.5–3 mm (0.059–0.118 in) wide on a petiole 1–2 mm (0.039–0.079 in) long. The upper surface of the leaves is glabrous, the edges are rolled downwards and the lower surface is densely cottony-hairy. The flower heads are 1.5–2 mm (0.059–0.079 in) wide with cream-coloured florets surrounded by four whorls of involucral bracts. The heads are crowded in corymbs on the ends of branchlets. Flowering occurs from mid-January to April and the achenes are about 0.7 mm (0.028 in) long with a white pappus about 2 mm (0.079 in) long.

== Taxonomy and naming ==
Cassinia tenuifolia was first formally described in 1867 by George Bentham in Flora Australiensis.

== Distribution ==
Cassinia tenuifolia is endemic to Lord Howe Island where it is widespread and common, especially near the coast and is sometimes considered a weed in pasture.
