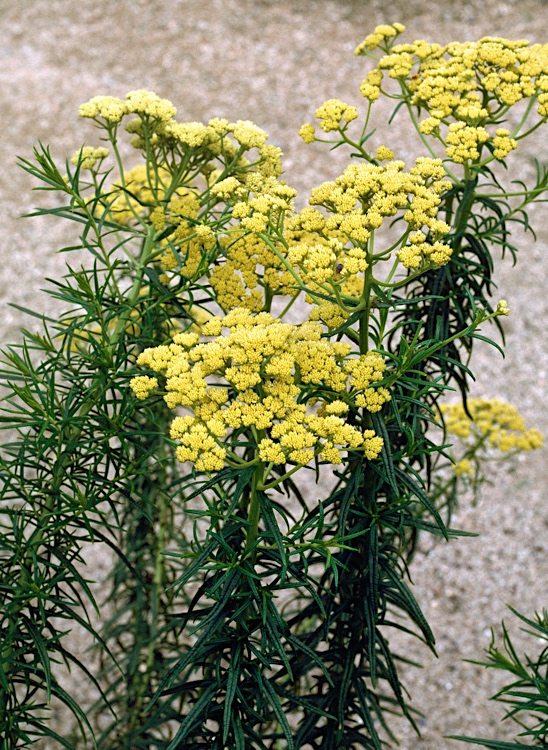
- In the Australian National Botanic Gardens

Scientific classification
- Kingdom: Plantae
- Clade: Tracheophytes
- Clade: Angiosperms
- Clade: Eudicots
- Clade: Asterids
- Order: Asterales
- Family: Asteraceae
- Genus: Cassinia
- Species: C. venusta

Binomial name
- Cassinia venusta Orchard

= Cassinia venusta =

Species of flowering plant

Cassinia venusta is a species of flowering plant in the family Asteraceae and is endemic to a small area near the border between New South Wales and Victoria. It is an erect shrub with glandular-hairy branchlets, glossy green, needle-shaped leaves, and corymbs of hundreds to thousands of yellowish flower heads.

== Description ==
Cassinia venusta is an erect shrub that typically grows to a height of 1–2 m (3 ft 3 in – 6 ft 7 in) with its branchlets densely covered with glandular hairs. The leaves are needle-shaped, 50–70 mm (2.0–2.8 in) long and 1–3 mm (0.039–0.118 in) wide. The upper surface of the leaves is glossy green and slightly sticky, the edges are rolled under and the lower surface is covered with woolly hairs. The flower heads are pale yellowish to green, 4–4.5 mm (0.16–0.18 in) long, 1–2 mm (0.039–0.079 in) wide, each head with four to seven dark yellow florets surrounded by ten to fourteen papery involucral bracts 2–3 mm (0.079–0.118 in) long. Between hundreds and thousands of heads are arranged in corymbs 65–85 mm (2.6–3.3 in) in diameter. Flowering occurs from November to February and the achenes are about 1 mm (0.039 in) long and lack a pappus.

== Taxonomy and naming ==
Cassinia venusta was first formally described in 2004 by Anthony Edward Orchard in Australian Systematic Botany from specimens collected on the slopes of Pine Mountain in 2004. The specific epithet (venusta) means "charming" or "beautiful".

== Distribution ==
Cassinia venusta is restricted to a small area near the New South Wales - Victoria border where it grows in forest among granite boulders at altitudes between 240 and 940 m (790 and 3,080 ft).
