= Cassinia × adunca =

Scientific classification
- Kingdom: Plantae
- Clade: Tracheophytes
- Clade: Angiosperms
- Clade: Eudicots
- Clade: Asterids
- Order: Asterales
- Family: Asteraceae
- Genus: Cassinia
- Species: C. × adunca

Binomial name
- Cassinia × adunca F.Muell. ex Sond.

Species of flowering plant

Cassinia × adunca is a species of flowering plant in the family Asteraceae and is endemic to South Australia. It was first formally described in 1853 by Otto Wilhelm Sonder in the journal Linnaea: ein Journal für die Botanik in ihrem ganzen Umfange, oder Beiträge zur Pflanzenkunde from an unpublished description by Ferdinand von Mueller. It is considered to be a hybrid, possibly between Cassinia complanata and C. tegulata.
