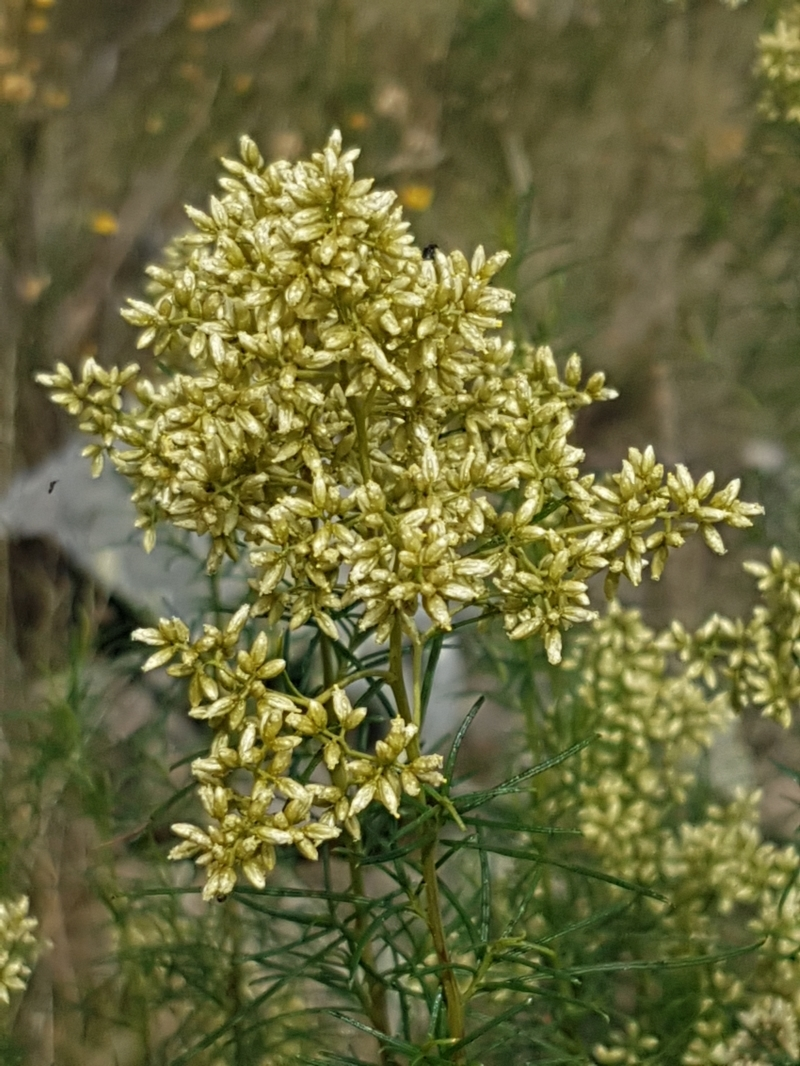

Scientific classification
- Kingdom: Plantae
- Clade: Tracheophytes
- Clade: Angiosperms
- Clade: Eudicots
- Clade: Asterids
- Order: Asterales
- Family: Asteraceae
- Genus: Cassinia
- Species: C. quinquefaria

Binomial name
- Cassinia quinquefaria R.Br.

= Cassinia quinquefaria =

Species of flowering plant

Cassinia quinquefaria is a species of flowering plant in the family Asteraceae and is endemic to eastern Australia. It is a shrub with sticky, hairy foliage, linear leaves, and heads of creamy-white flowers arranged in a dense panicle.

== Description ==
Cassinia quinquefaria is a shrub that typically grows to a height of 1–3 m (3 ft 3 in – 9 ft 10 in), its foliage covered with spreading glandular hairs and usually sticky. The leaves are linear, 20–40 mm (0.79–1.57 in) long and 1–1.5 mm (0.039–0.059 in) wide. The upper surface of the leaves is sticky, the edges are rolled under and the lower surface is covered with fine hairs. The flower heads are oblong to bell-shaped, 2.5–3 mm (0.098–0.118 in) long and 1.0–3.0 mm (0.039–0.118 in) wide, each with five or six creamy-white florets surrounded by four or five overlapping rows of involucral bracts. The heads are arranged in a dense, pyramid-shaped panicle 50–100 mm (2.0–3.9 in) long and 40–60 mm (1.6–2.4 in) wide. Flowering mainly occurs in summer and autumn and the achenes are about 0.8 mm (0.031 in) long with a pappus 2–2.5 mm (0.079–0.098 in) long.

== Taxonomy and naming ==
Cassinia quinquefaria was first formally described in 1818 by Robert Brown in the Transactions of the Linnean Society of London.

== Distribution and habitat ==
This cassinia grows in woodland and forest and is widespread in eastern New South Wales, the Australian Capital Territory and south-eastern Queensland.
