= Lake Rescue (Vermont) =

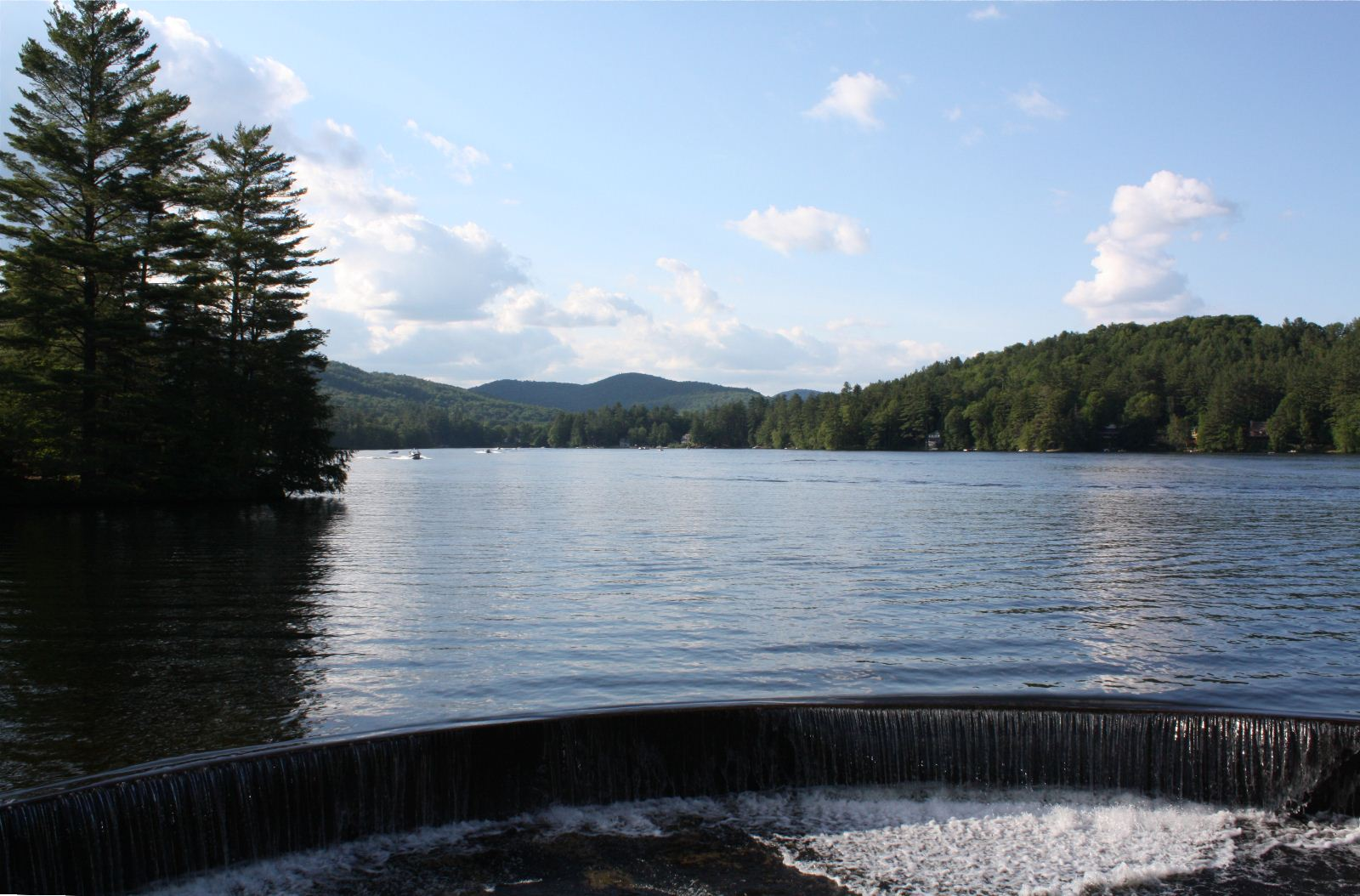
- Lake Rescue and the horseshoe dam, looking north from Red Bridge

- Location within Vermont Location within the United States

- Lake Rescue Depth Chart, prepared by Vermont ANR
- Location: Windsor county, Vermont, United States
- Coordinates: 43.4514601°N 72.7023191°W
- Type: Reservoir
- Primary inflows: Black River
- Primary outflows: Black River
- Basin countries: United States
- Max. length: 5,900 feet (1.8 km)
- Max. width: 2,200 feet (0.67 km) widest point
- Surface area: 184 acres (0.74 km^{2})
- Average depth: 24 feet (7.3 m)
- Max. depth: 95 feet (29 m)
- Water volume: 4,416 acre-feet (5,447,000 m^{3})
- Surface elevation: 1,043 feet (318 m)
- Settlements: Ludlow

Lake Rescue is located in Windsor County of south central Vermont, in the northeastern United States. Occupying 180 acres (73 ha) and reaching depths of 95 feet (29 m), it is the tenth-deepest and 23rd-largest lake in the state. Lake Rescue is located along VT Route 100 about three miles north of Ludlow and Okemo Mountain, and it is surrounded by the town of Ludlow. The lake is fed by the Black River and is the third of four lakes extending from Plymouth, Vermont through Ludlow, with Lake Amherst and Echo Lake to the north and Lake Pauline to the south. The northern section of the lake, connected to the main body via a shallow channel, is referred to as Round Pond.

== Recreation area ==
The lake is used year-round predominantly by the residents of the approximately 110 lakeside homes and camps who enjoy swimming, waterskiing, fishing, sailing in summer and ice-fishing, skating, and snowmobiling in winter. Although no public swimming beaches exist, the lake does have a state-maintained public fishing access point where boats can be launched. Parking on Red Bridge road is permitted between Lake Shore drive and East Lake Road. Fish include bass, perch, lake trout, brown trout, rainbow trout, pickerel, and sunfish. A "horseshoe" dam separates Lake Rescue from Lake Pauline, over which passes the Red Bridge. Lake Rescue is north of Red Bridge and power boats (but not jet skis) are permitted on the lake. Pauline Lake is to the south of Red Bridge and only non-motorized propelled craft are allowed.

== Lake characteristics ==
The Vermont Agency of Natural Resources posts a report on the water quality of Vermont lakes, with the 2015 report summarized as follows:

- The water quality classification is B.
- The lake type is NATURAL with ARTIFICIAL CONTROL.
- Physical information:
  - The lake area is 184 acres (74 ha).
  - The watershed area is 22,859 acres (9,251 ha).
  - The maximum depth is 95 feet (29 m).
  - The mean depth is 24 feet (7.3 m).
  - The volume is 4,416 acre-feet (5,447,000 m^{3}).
- Land use in the lake watershed: 98% undeveloped, 2% developed
- Lay Monitoring Program - Water chemistry monitoring data summary:
  - The average spring phosphorus concentration is 8.57 ug/L, based on 17 years of data.
  - The average Secchi disk measurement is 13 feet (3.9 m), based on 13 years of data.
  - The average summer phosphorus concentration is 12.40 ug/L, based on 10 years of data.
  - The average chlorophyll-a concentration is 4.22 ug/L, based on 10 years of data.
  - The trophic state is mesotrophic.

== Environmental issues ==
In 1998 the Department of Natural Resources, State of Vermont, found 70 plants of Eurasian milfoil growing in the Round Pond section of the lake. Since then, there has been an ongoing effort to prevent the spread of this invasive water plant in Lake Rescue. Since 1999 the Lake Rescue Association (LRA) has hired scuba divers to look for and remove milfoil plants from Lake Rescue, Round Pond and Lake Pauline. The LRA Board at that time acted quickly to employ divers to hand pull the discovered plants and each following year divers have been employed by the association to survey the lake. From 1999 to 2003 paid divers searched and removed about 100 milfoil plants. Lake Rescue was free of milfoil from 2004 until 2013. Tropical Storm Irene hit the region in 2011 and the massive inflow of sediment from that storm into the lake made it difficult to search for milfoil in 2012 and 2013 but the first, new milfoil plant was found in 2013. Since 2014, the LRA Board increased the number of days that divers were employed to survey and hand pull milfoil plants. In addition to thoroughly searching the entire lake for milfoil twice a week over the summer in 2016, the LRA board was reviewing other measures and was conducting a program of lake-user education/outreach, and public access education/inspection.

== History of the lake and its name ==
In 1835 a dam was built at the southern end of the lake to generate water power, which increased the size of the existing lake. The lake became an active summer resort by the early 1900s.

From an unreferenced, yellowed newspaper clipping found in the archives at the Black River Academy Museum, titled “Lakes and Legends of Plymouth,” likely from the early 1900s:

“Lake Rescue was one of the last ones [note: the others being Lake Amherst and Echo Lake] to receive a name, being formerly called Plymouth Pond or the Reservoir. As long ago as the eighties people were suggesting euphonious titles for this body of water, which is much larger than the others in the valley.

There are two traditions concerning this lake, either or both substantiating that Lake Rescue is appropriately named. In the western part of Cavendish in the Revolutionary days there existed a famous tavern, known as Captain Coffin’s Tavern. This was located on the old Crown Point road and was a great resort.

One March day Capt. Coffin was returning from the settlements on Otter Creek by means of snowshoes. To shorten the distance he crossed Plymouth Pond. He accidentally stopped into an air hole that was covered in snow and plunged into the icy water. Although he was possessed of great strength he found it impossible to get out, encumbered as he was by his snowshoes, heavy coat and pack, without assistance which was furnished by his dog. The dog showed almost human intelligence in aiding him. Capt. Coffin frequently told the story of how his dog saved his life.

The other tradition and probably the one in mind when the lake was christened was of a child that strayed away from one of the Cavendish settlers' homes and became lost in the woods. Searching parties later found the child on the eastern shores of the lake on a rock and unalarmed by her experience of several days and nights in the forests. The child told of spending one night with a big black sheep and two lambs who kept her warm. The black sheep and lambs were thought to have been a friendly black bear and her cubs. The particulars are lacking as to the christening of the lake except that about 150 people met on the shore of the lake in August, 1881 and rechristened Plymouth Lake, Lake Rescue.”

== Lake Rescue Association ==
The Lake Rescue Association, a 501(c)(3) organization, was formed in 1933 and is open to all property owners in the two lake region of Lake Rescue and Pauline. The association exists to promote water safety, environmental education, improved water quality, and resolution of pertinent matters among association members.
