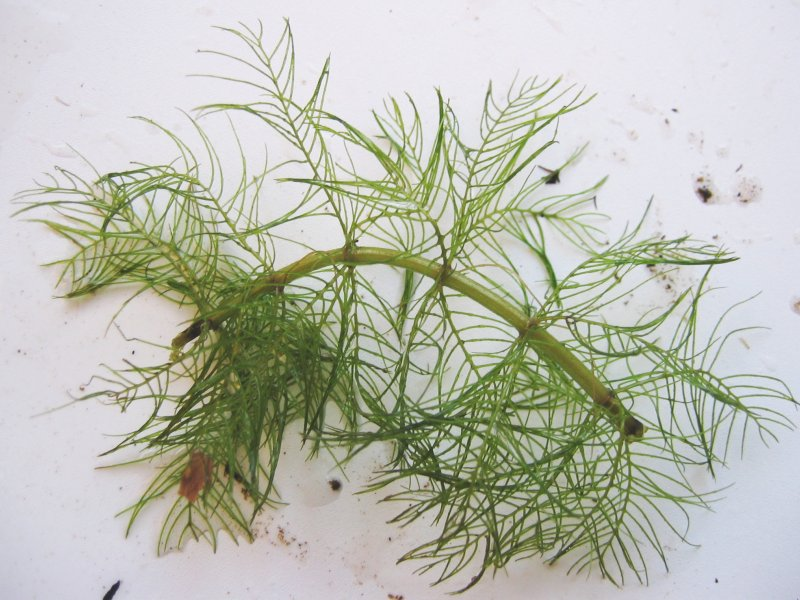

Conservation status
- Least Concern (IUCN 3.1)

- Secure (NatureServe)

Scientific classification
- Kingdom: Plantae
- Clade: Embryophytes
- Clade: Tracheophytes
- Clade: Spermatophytes
- Clade: Angiosperms
- Clade: Eudicots
- Order: Saxifragales
- Family: Haloragaceae
- Genus: Myriophyllum
- Species: M. verticillatum

Binomial name
- Myriophyllum verticillatum L., 1753

Synonyms
- Myriophyllum limosum Hectot ex DC. (1815); Myriophyllum pectinatum DC. (1815); Myriophyllum siculum Guss. (1844); Myriophyllum verticillatum var. pinnatum Wallr. (1822); Potamogeton verticillatus (L.) Walter (1788)

= Myriophyllum verticillatum =

Flowering plant species in the watermilfoil family

Myriophyllum verticillatum, the whorl-leaf watermilfoil or whorled water-milfoil, is a species of flowering plant native to much of North America, North Africa, and Eurasia. It closely resembles another native milfoil, called northern water milfoil (M. sibiricum). Whorled water milfoil is also easily confused with four types of invasive milfoils: Eurasian water milfoil (M. spicatum), Variable water-milfoil (M. heterophyllum), Parrot feather (M. aquaticum), and hybrid water milfoil (M. heterophyllum × M. laxum).

In many areas it is an invasive aquatic plant.

With the increase in water sports, the spread of many water milfoils (Haloragaceae) has increased over the years. The spread of a milfoil is not only within one area, sometimes it spreads from one area to another many miles away.

To the untrained eye, whorled water milfoil can look similar to other species.

== Description and identification ==
The best way to identify whorled water milfoil (M. verticillatum) is by looking at its two different types of leaves. The first type is the submerged leaf, which looks feathery and contains about 5 to 14 leaflet pairs per leaf. The whorls along the stem contain about 4 to 5 leaves, which are spaced about 1 cm apart. The other type is known as the emergent leaves. These leaves occur on the emergent spike and are pinnately lobed. From June till September, whorled water milfoil produces flowers and fruits above or at the water's surface on erect spikes along the emergent leaves. The emergent leaves are typically two or more times longer than the flowers and fruits.

Another way to distinguish whorled water milfoil is to look for turions, winter buds that appear toward the end of its growing season. This milfoil is one of a few that produce turions. This characteristic can also rule out other types of water milfoil that lack turions such as Eurasian water milfoil, parrot feather, hybrid water milfoil, and low water milfoil. The turions of this milfoil look like long yellowish-green club-shaped buds with small stiff leaves attached to the submerged stem. In the spring after dormancy the small, thick, dark green turions expand and grow from the stem. As the plant develops roots and continues to grow, the larger green summer leaves are produced at the tip of the plant. Turion leaves can be seen at the base of the plant sometimes into July. In fall, the turions, with some other plant material, often break away from the majority of the rooted plant and float to new areas. Those fragments can be found washing up along shorelines in late fall. The stems of the whorled water milfoil form into mats from branched and unbranched stems that grow to be 20 to 100 inches long.

== Habitat ==
Most whorled water milfoil occurs in semi-shallow ponds, lakes, marshes, ditches and slow running streams of lowland districts. Milfoil thrives in areas with a light sandy bottom and medium loamy soils. Overall, the plant grows best in still waters with alkaline soils. Whorled water milfoil is sometimes found with or near other aquatic plants, such as some types of pondweed (Potamogeton strictifolius) and (Potamogeton ogdenii), water star-grass (Heteranthera dubia) and water-marigold (Megalodonta beckii).

== Distribution ==
It is native in much of North America, the United Kingdom, Asia, and North Africa, and invasive to Ireland.

== Propagation and reproduction ==
Whorled water-milfoil reproduces by producing turions between September and November each year. These over-wintering turions sink to the bottom of the floor where they remain dormant until February [Caffrey, 2006]. These fragments will give rise to numerous small thin roots that bed into soil to start growing in spring. The plants are monoecious (individual flowers are either male or female, but both sexes can be found on the same plant) and are pollinated by wind.

== Control and uses ==
Whorled water milfoil is a good water oxygenator in small quantities such as fish and frog ponds. It is also ideal in providing protection and respiration for fish spawn. Management techniques of whorled water milfoil are not exactly known, but natural competition with other invasive aquatic plants has been the main control so far. There are a few management practices that some places are using, but they have not been approved for long-term usage.
