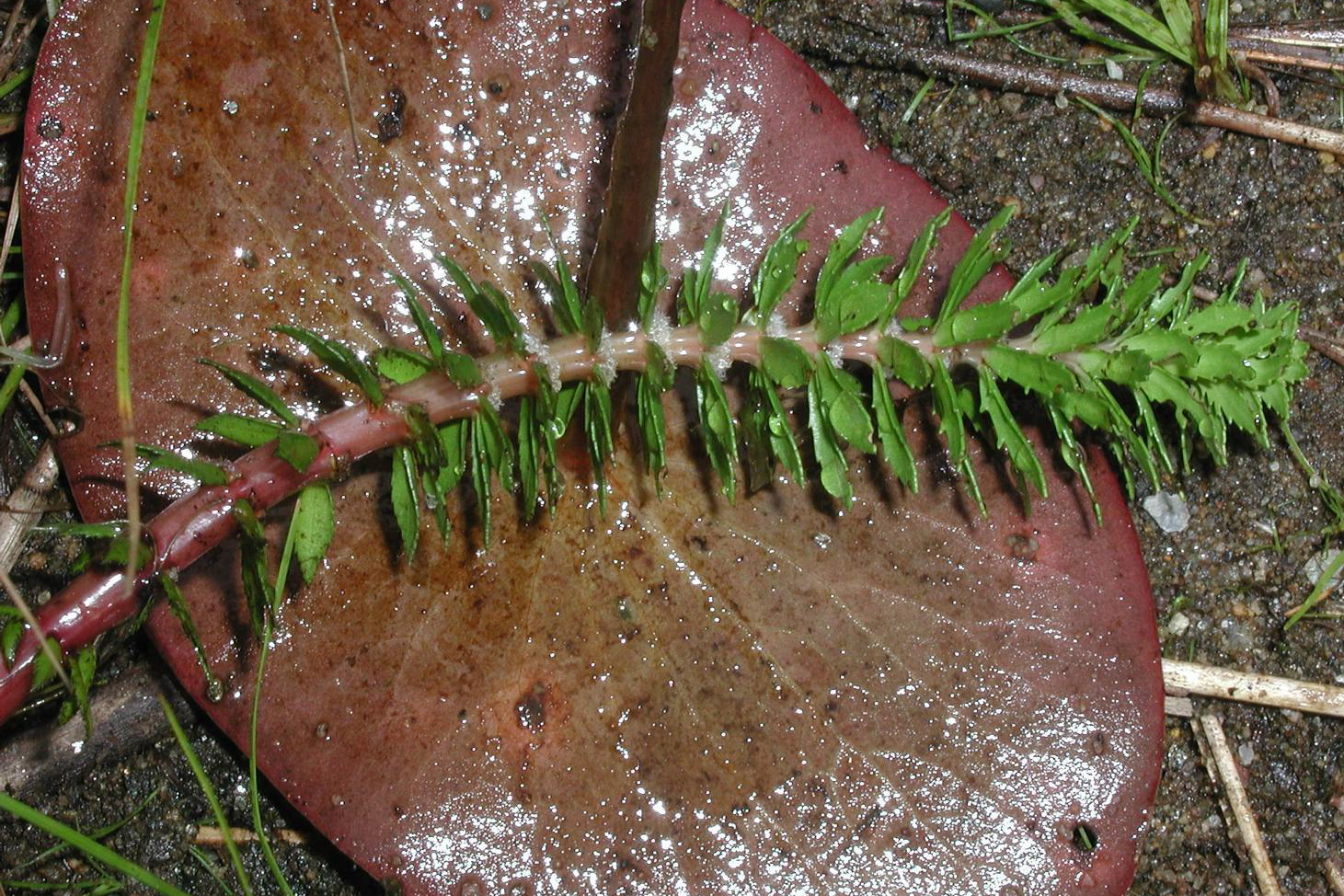

Conservation status
- Least Concern (IUCN 3.1)

- Secure (NatureServe)

Scientific classification
- Kingdom: Plantae
- Clade: Tracheophytes
- Clade: Angiosperms
- Clade: Eudicots
- Order: Saxifragales
- Family: Haloragaceae
- Genus: Myriophyllum
- Species: M. heterophyllum

Binomial name
- Myriophyllum heterophyllum Michx.

= Myriophyllum heterophyllum =

Species of flowering plant

Myriophyllum heterophyllum (English: twoleaf watermilfoil or broadleaf watermilfoil) is a species from the genus Myriophyllum native to North America. It was first described by André Michaux.

== Description ==
Myriophyllum heterophyllum is also known in English as either the twoleaf watermilfoil or broadleaf watermilfoil. It is a popular plant in aquariums or garden-ponds. The species is often misidentified or overlooked due to issues in predictions of infestations and dispersal. It is often mistaken as M. verticillatum in Europe or M. hippuroides, M. laxum or M. pinnatum in North America due to their similar vegetation.

== Range ==
Myriophyllum heterophyllum is endemic to the eastern part of the United States and Canada. In the European Union, the plant has also been found in Austria, Belgium, Germany, Spain, France, Hungary, Sweden and the Netherlands. Citizen science observations also suggests occurrences in the western-part of the United States and Central America.

=== Invasive species ===
In the European Union the species is naturalised in the wild and poses a threat to biodiversity. It grows rapidly and can form dense mats just underneath the water surface, causing reduced availability of oxygen and sunlight. The European Union considers the risk of the species spreading high within the EU. As a preventative measure, Myriophyllum heterophyllum is included since 2017 in the list of Invasive Alien Species of Union concern (the Union list). This implies a ban of the import, trade, sale and transport of the species within the EU.
