= Black River (Connecticut River tributary) =

River in the U.S. state of Vermont

Coordinates: 43°15′50″N 72°26′22″W

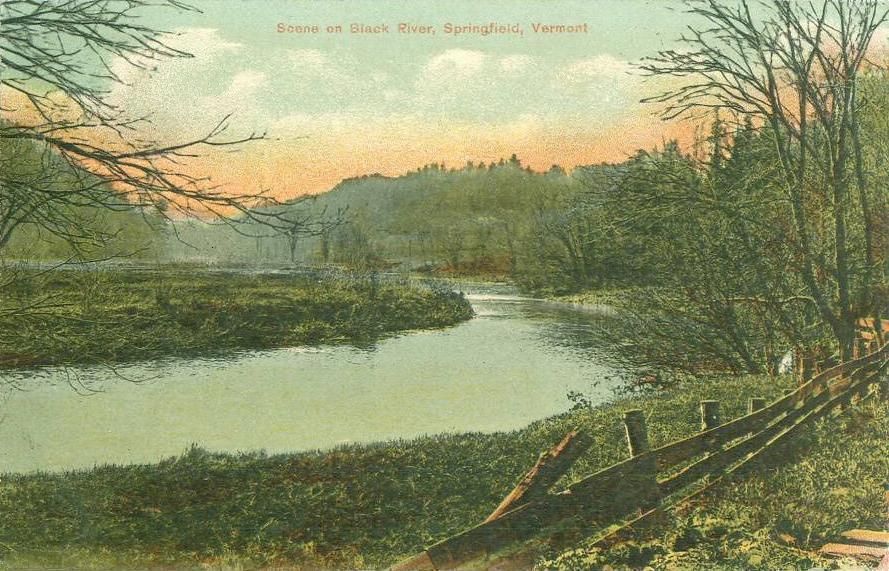
Black River at Springfield in 1907

The Black River is a 40.8-mile-long (65.7 km) river in the U.S. state of Vermont, and a tributary of the Connecticut River. The river's watershed consists of approximately 202 square miles (520 km^{2}) in southeastern Vermont, almost all of which lies in Windsor County.

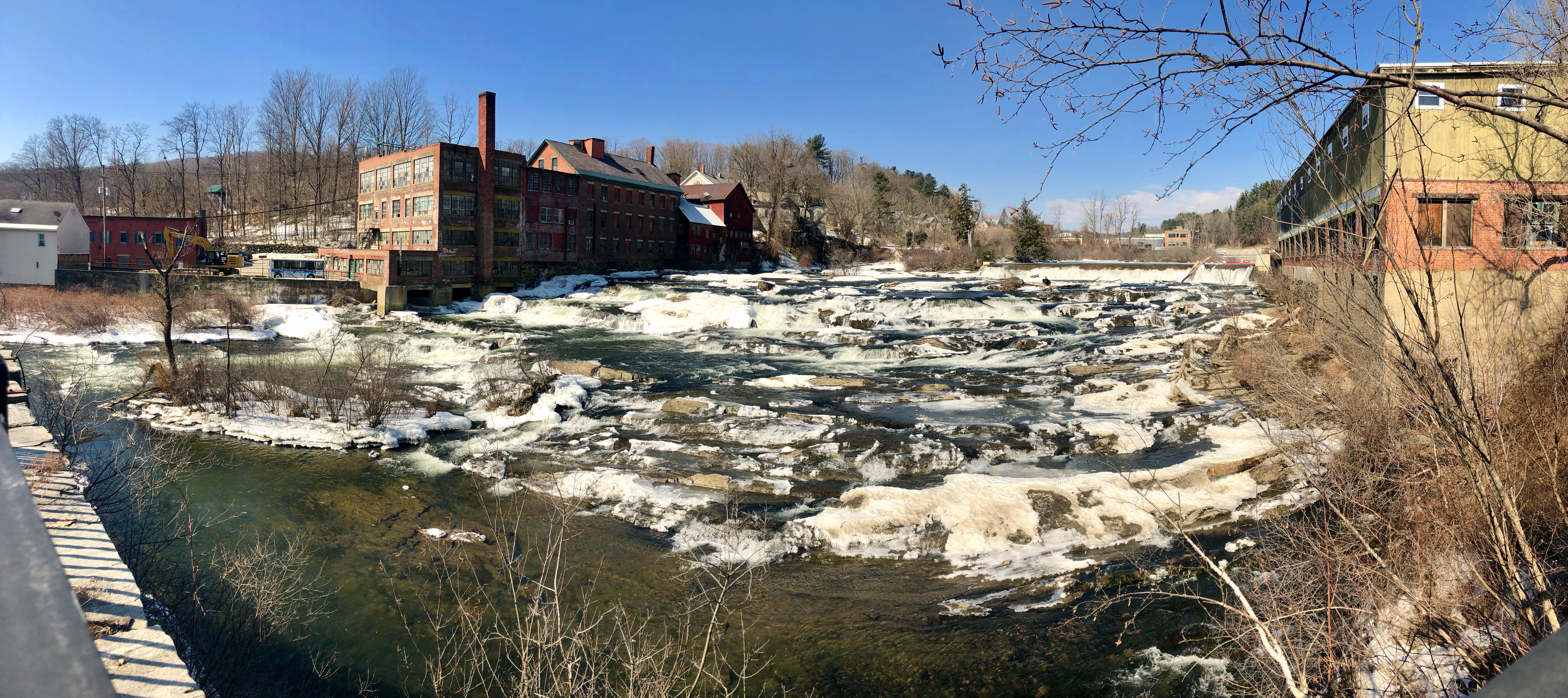
Black River (or Comtu) Falls in late winter, 2019

== Course ==
The Black River begins in a small body of water called Black Pond, in Plymouth, Vermont. Winding its way toward the town of Ludlow, its narrow flow picks up a variety of small brooks and streams and is cooled by overhanging branches. Passing through Amherst Lake, Echo Lake, Lake Rescue, and Lake Pauline, the Black River picks up more tributaries and winds through the town of Ludlow, the home of Okemo Mountain Ski Resort. Tumbling through impressive Cavendish Gorge, the river widens as it passes under the Downers Covered Bridge and enters Perkinsville.

The North Branch of the Black River, its headwaters in Reading, joins the main stem in Weathersfield at the flood control dam. Built by the Army Corps of Engineers between 1957 and 1960, the dam holds back waters to protect the downstream towns of North Springfield and Springfield from floods.

The Black River pushes on through these final two towns, past small dams and many industrial sites, until its final confluence with the Connecticut River at Hoyt's Landing, across from New Hampshire's Fort at Number 4 in Charlestown. Its watershed lies south of the Ottauquechee River and north of the Williams River.

== History ==
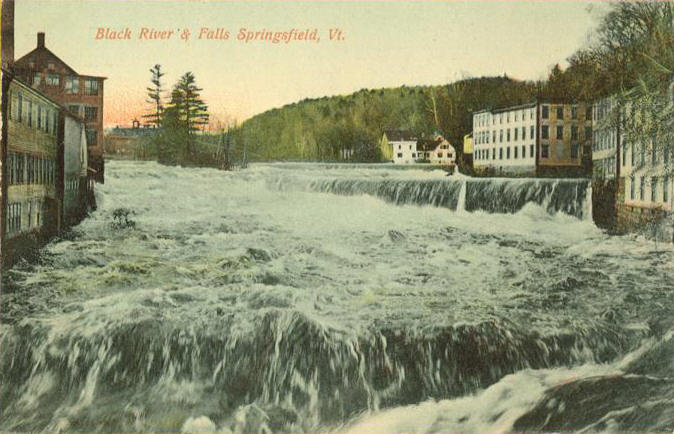
Black River and Falls in Springfield c. 1910

Since the settlement of Springfield in the mid-18th century, the river has been at its heart. A source of power for the many industrial factories built on her shores, many small hydro dams were built near the impressive Comtu Falls in the center of Springfield. The official name of those falls is Black River Falls.

Flooding was a common occurrence on the Black River. Particularly noteworthy was the flood of 1927. A late-season tropical storm brought torrential rains to the lower towns of the watershed in early November. The small tributary streams overflowed their banks, releasing thousands of gallons of cold water into the Black River. Homes were lost, hundreds of thousands of dollars of damage was done, and businesses were destroyed.

== See also ==
- List of rivers of Vermont
