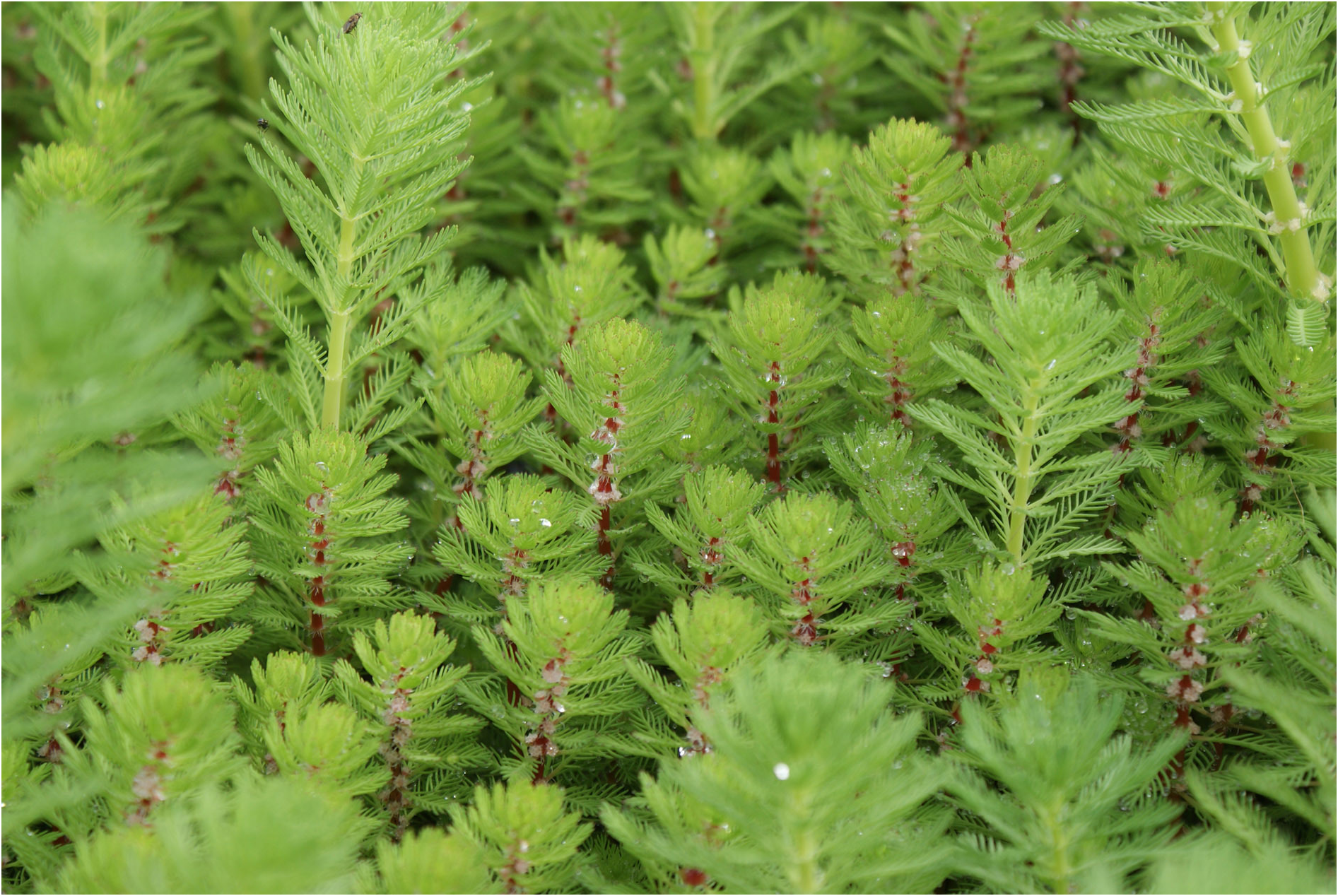
- Myriophyllum rubricaule (center) has red stems and is a bit slower growing than the green-stemmed M. aquaticum surrounding it.
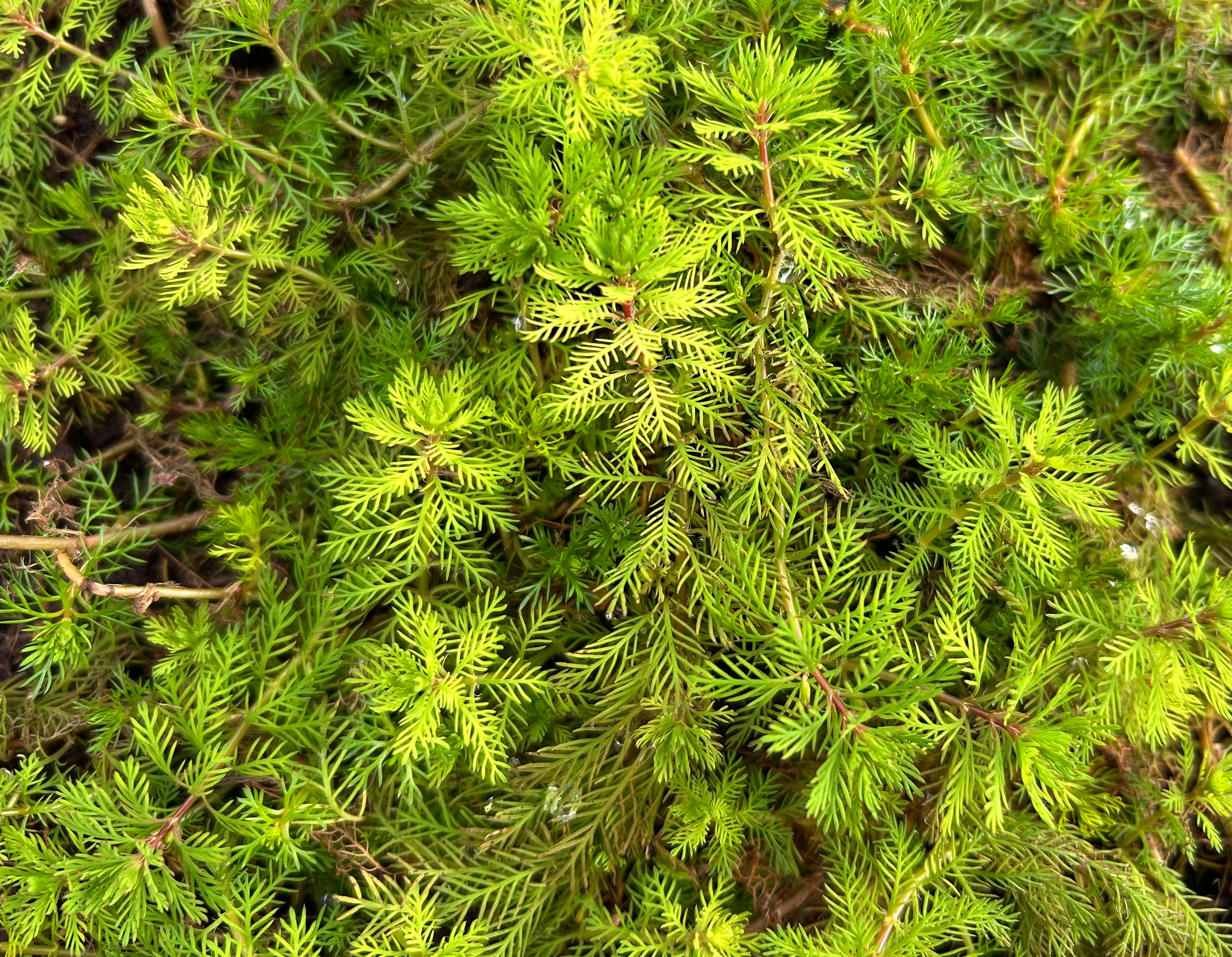
- In the Netherlands

Scientific classification
- Kingdom: Plantae
- Clade: Embryophytes
- Clade: Tracheophytes
- Clade: Spermatophytes
- Clade: Angiosperms
- Clade: Eudicots
- Order: Saxifragales
- Family: Haloragaceae
- Genus: Myriophyllum
- Species: M. rubricaule

Binomial name
- Myriophyllum rubricaule Valk. & Duist.

= Myriophyllum rubricaule =

Species of plant

Myriophyllum rubricaule, the red-stemmed parrot's feather, is a species of flowering plant in the watermilfoil family Haloragaceae. It is native to central and south-central Chile, and it has been introduced to a number of European countries. It is used as an aquarium plant, replacing the banned invasive Myriophyllum aquaticum in European trade.
