= John F. Murphy Sr. =

American politician

John Francis 'Murph' Murphy Sr. (February 22, 1923 – November 19, 2011) was an American politician.

Born in Ludlow, Vermont, he went to Black River Academy and then to Windsor Trade School. Murphy then worked as a machinist for General Electric for twenty-eight years. He was a member of the Vermont House of Representatives between 1969 and 1998 and was a Democrat. He then served as water commissioner in Ludlow. He died in Ludlow, Vermont. Murphy's funeral was held on November 23, 2011, and he was eulogized by Ralph G. Wright.
