= Ludlow Mountain =

Mountain in Vermont, United States

- Location within Vermont

Highest point
- Elevation: 3,344 ft (1,019 m)
- Coordinates: 43°24′05″N 72°43′00″W

Geography
- Location: Ludlow, Vermont, United States

Ludlow Mountain is a mountain located in Ludlow, Vermont. Okemo Mountain Resort is a ski resort located on Ludlow Mountain. Before becoming a popular ski resort destination, Ludlow was originally a mill town, and was the home of a General Electric plant until 1977.

== Climate ==
Climate data for Ludlow Mountain 43.4057 N, 72.7500 W, Elevation: 3,068 ft (935 m) (1991–2020 normals)
Month	Jan	Feb	Mar	Apr	May	Jun	Jul	Aug	Sep	Oct	Nov	Dec	Year
Mean daily maximum °F (°C)	24.3 (−4.3)	26.4 (−3.1)	34.2 (1.2)	47.7 (8.7)	60.0 (15.6)	68.2 (20.1)	72.8 (22.7)	71.5 (21.9)	65.5 (18.6)	52.8 (11.6)	39.9 (4.4)	29.3 (−1.5)	49.4 (9.7)
Daily mean °F (°C)	15.5 (−9.2)	16.7 (−8.5)	24.7 (−4.1)	37.1 (2.8)	48.7 (9.3)	57.2 (14.0)	61.8 (16.6)	60.5 (15.8)	54.4 (12.4)	42.6 (5.9)	31.6 (−0.2)	21.6 (−5.8)	39.4 (4.1)
Mean daily minimum °F (°C)	6.7 (−14.1)	7.0 (−13.9)	15.1 (−9.4)	26.5 (−3.1)	37.5 (3.1)	46.2 (7.9)	50.8 (10.4)	49.4 (9.7)	43.3 (6.3)	32.5 (0.3)	23.4 (−4.8)	13.9 (−10.1)	29.4 (−1.5)
Average precipitation inches (mm)	4.00 (102)	3.82 (97)	4.40 (112)	4.64 (118)	4.77 (121)	5.55 (141)	5.12 (130)	5.03 (128)	4.44 (113)	5.85 (149)	4.48 (114)	4.92 (125)	57.02 (1,450)
Source: PRISM Climate Group
