= Ludlow Graded School =

- U.S. National Register of Historic Places
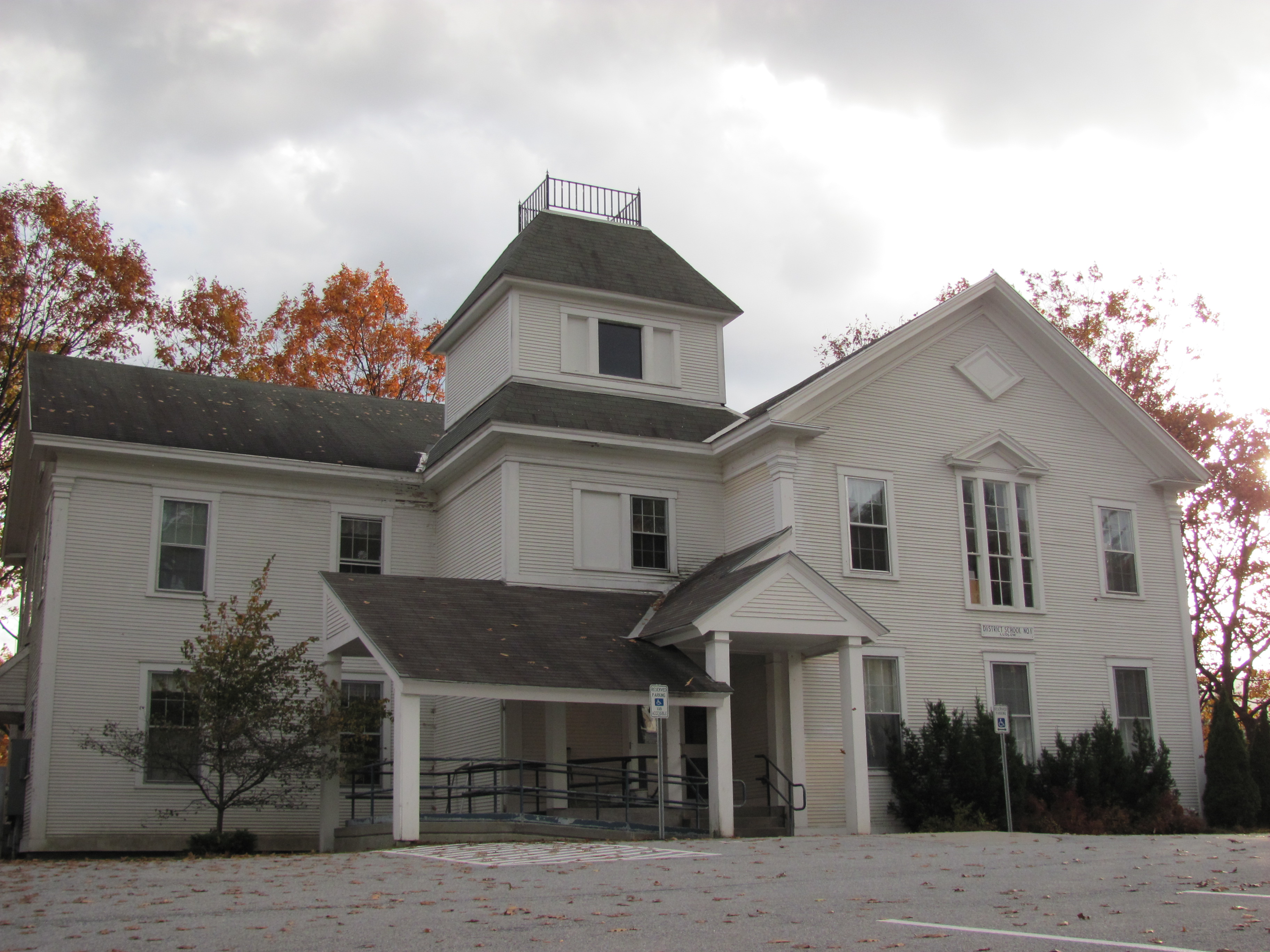

- Location within Vermont Location within the United States
- Location: 10 High St., Ludlow, Vermont
- Coordinates: 43°23′48″N 72°41′52″W
- Area: 1 acre (0.40 ha)
- Built: 1871
- NRHP reference No.: 79000276
- Added to NRHP: November 29, 1979

The Ludlow Graded School is a historic former school building at 10 High Street in the village of Ludlow, Vermont. Built in 1871–72, the school was for many years the primary school feeding the adjacent Black River Academy (on whose original site it stands). The building now serves as a local senior services center. It was listed on the National Register of Historic Places in 1979.

== Description and history ==
The former Ludlow Graded School building stands on the south side of High Street, a short way west of the Ludlow village green. It is set between the former Black River Academy building (now a local history museum), and the Ludlow Baptist Church, separated from the road by the parking lot it shares with the academy building. It is a roughly L-shaped 2 1/2-story wood-frame structure, with a gabled main section facing toward the street and a cross-gabled ell extending to the east. In the crook of the L is the building's most prominent feature, a three-story square tower topped by a truncated hip roof with railing above. The main entrance is in the front of this tower, sheltered by a porch with a complex combination of shed and gabled roofs and supported by square posts. The main facade has pilastered corners and a central three-part window topped by a gabled pediment; most of the other building windows are sash.

The school was built in 1871–72, originally with a 1 1/2-story ell. The ell was raised to its present size in 1903. The tower is a replacement of an original tower, which featured a Second Empire-style mansard roof with cresting. The school was built on the first site of the Black River Academy, which burned in 1844, and replaced a district school (located elsewhere) that was also destroyed by fire. This school served the local community until 1938, when a new school was opened on the village outskirts. In the late 1970s, the building was adapted for use as a social services center. It is owned by the Black River Historical Society, which also owns the academy building.

== See also ==
- National Register of Historic Places listings in Windsor County, Vermont
