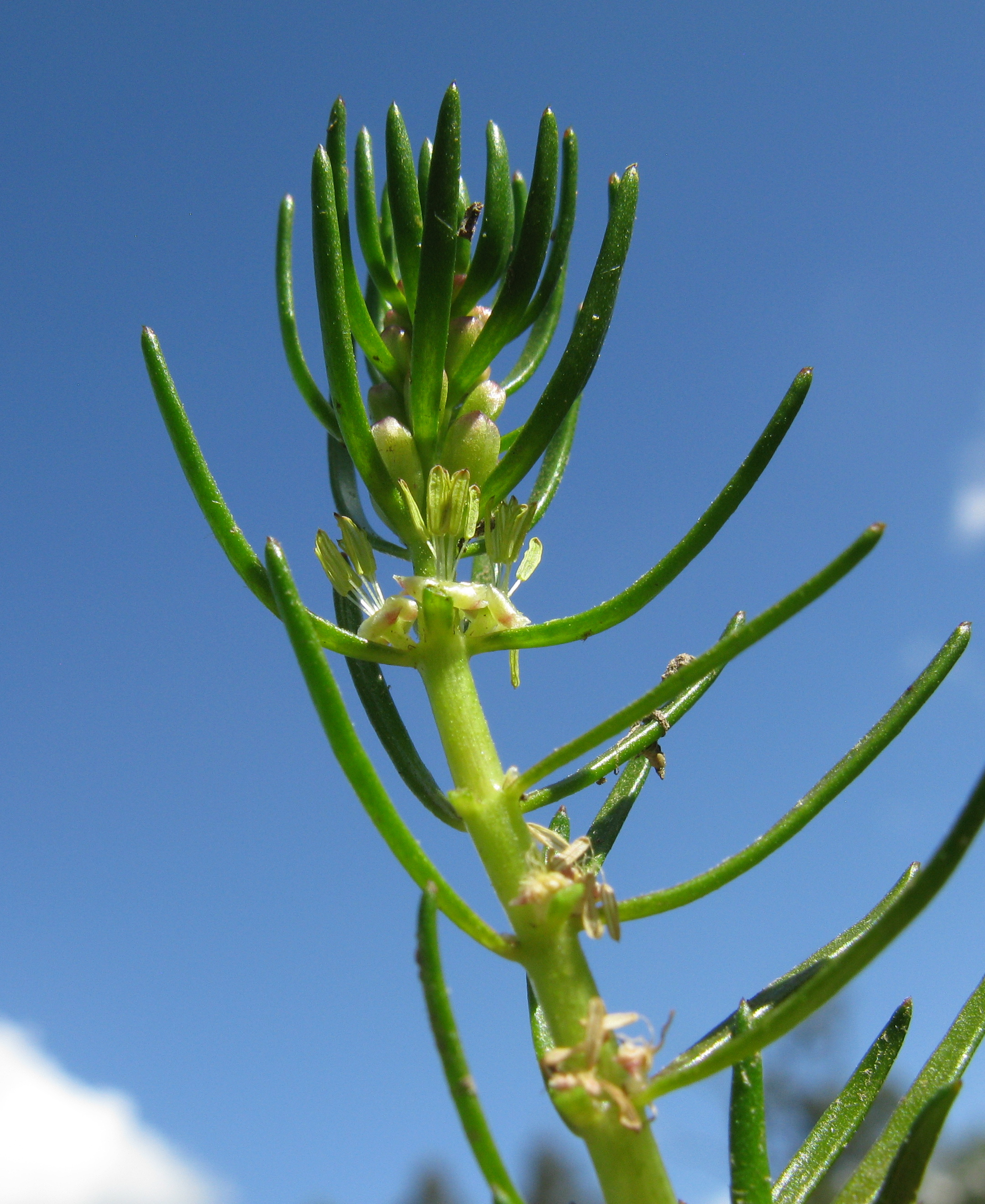

Scientific classification
- Kingdom: Plantae
- Clade: Tracheophytes
- Clade: Angiosperms
- Clade: Eudicots
- Order: Saxifragales
- Family: Haloragaceae
- Genus: Myriophyllum
- Species: M. variifolium

Binomial name
- Myriophyllum variifolium Hook.f.

= Myriophyllum variifolium =

Species of flowering plant native to Australia

Myriophyllum variifolium is a species of water milfoil native to eastern Australia where it grows in aquatic habitat such as ponds and streams.

Joseph Dalton Hooker described the species in 1840, from material collected in the Lachlan River, as well as Tasmania. The Tasmanian material resembled the description more closely, and the New South Wales material has been separated as a different species, hence the original Tasmanian material was made the neolectotype.

Myriophyllum variifolium is found from southeastern South Australia and western Victoria, and eastern Victoria through New South Wales into southeastern Queensland. It also occurs in central and eastern Tasmania. It grows in shallow still or slowly-moving water .30 to 2 m (0.98 to 6.56 ft) deep.

An aquatic herbaceous plant, M. variifolium grows to about 50 cm (20 in) in length, its smooth stems around 0.5 cm (0.20 in) in diameter.

Myriophyllum variifolium intergrades with the very similar M. simulans in western Victoria and South Australia. Molecular work indicated that M. variifolium and related species require further genetic investigation and that as yet undescribed cryptic species are likely; two lineages of M. variifolium were identified and both were paraphyletic to one lineage of M. simulans and an undescribed species.

Myriophyllum variifolium can be distinguished from M. simulans by its fruit—the former has yellowish brown cylindrical fruit around 1.5 mm long, while the latter has reddish purple oval fruit around 1 mm long. The leaves of M. variifolium are arranged in whorls of five, while those of M. simulans are arranged in whorls of three or four.

A desirable plant in pond or aquarium planting, M. variifolium provides shelter for eggs and juvenile fish (fry). It needs to be planted in at least 20 cm (7.9 in) of water.
