= Myriophyllum crispatum =

Scientific classification
- Kingdom: Plantae
- Clade: Tracheophytes
- Clade: Angiosperms
- Clade: Eudicots
- Order: Saxifragales
- Family: Haloragaceae
- Genus: Myriophyllum
- Species: M. crispatum

Binomial name
- Myriophyllum crispatum A.E.Orchard

Species of flowering plant

Myriophyllum crispatum is a species of water milfoil native to Australia.

== Description ==
Myriophyllum crispatum has 25–60 cm (9.8–23.6 in) tall stems. The leaves grow in whorls of 5–8. Submerged leaves are thread-like with 12–20 leaflets. Intermediate leaves are thicker with 6–8 short pinnae, transitioning into smooth linear terete forms.

Myriophyllum crispatum is monoecious. The male flower has 4 cream to dark brown or purple petals. The female flower lacks petals.

== Ecology ==
Myriophyllum crispatum occurs in Western Australia, south-eastern Australia, northern Tasmania, and south-eastern Queensland. It is most commonly found in shallow, stagnant water.
