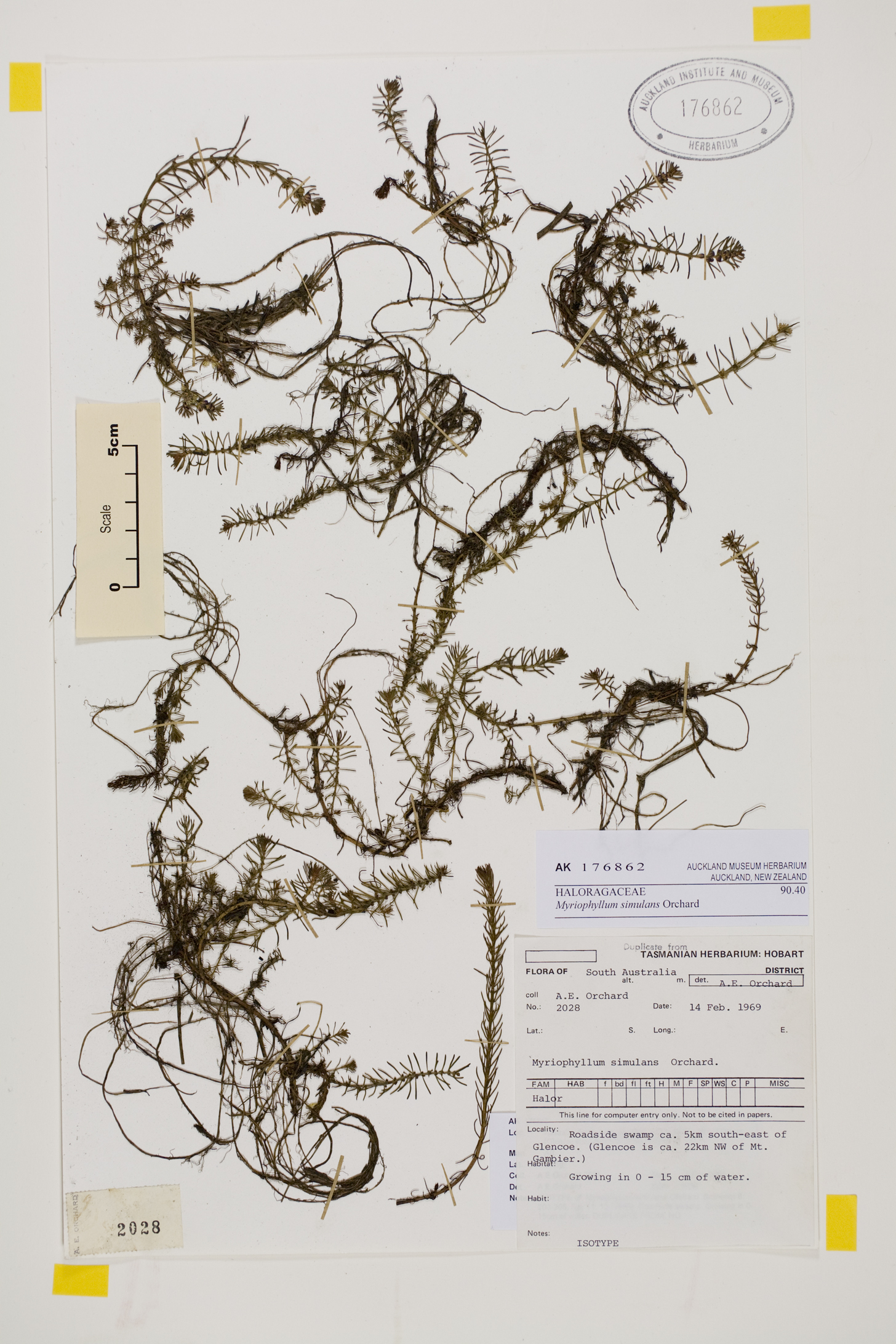

Scientific classification
- Kingdom: Plantae
- Clade: Tracheophytes
- Clade: Angiosperms
- Clade: Eudicots
- Order: Saxifragales
- Family: Haloragaceae
- Genus: Myriophyllum
- Species: M. simulans

Binomial name
- Myriophyllum simulans Orchard

= Myriophyllum simulans =

Species of flowering plant native to Australia

Myriophyllum simulans is a species of water milfoil native to southeastern Australia where it grows in aquatic habitat such as ponds and streams, as well as muddy or swampy soil. Highly variable, it closely resembles M. variifolium.
