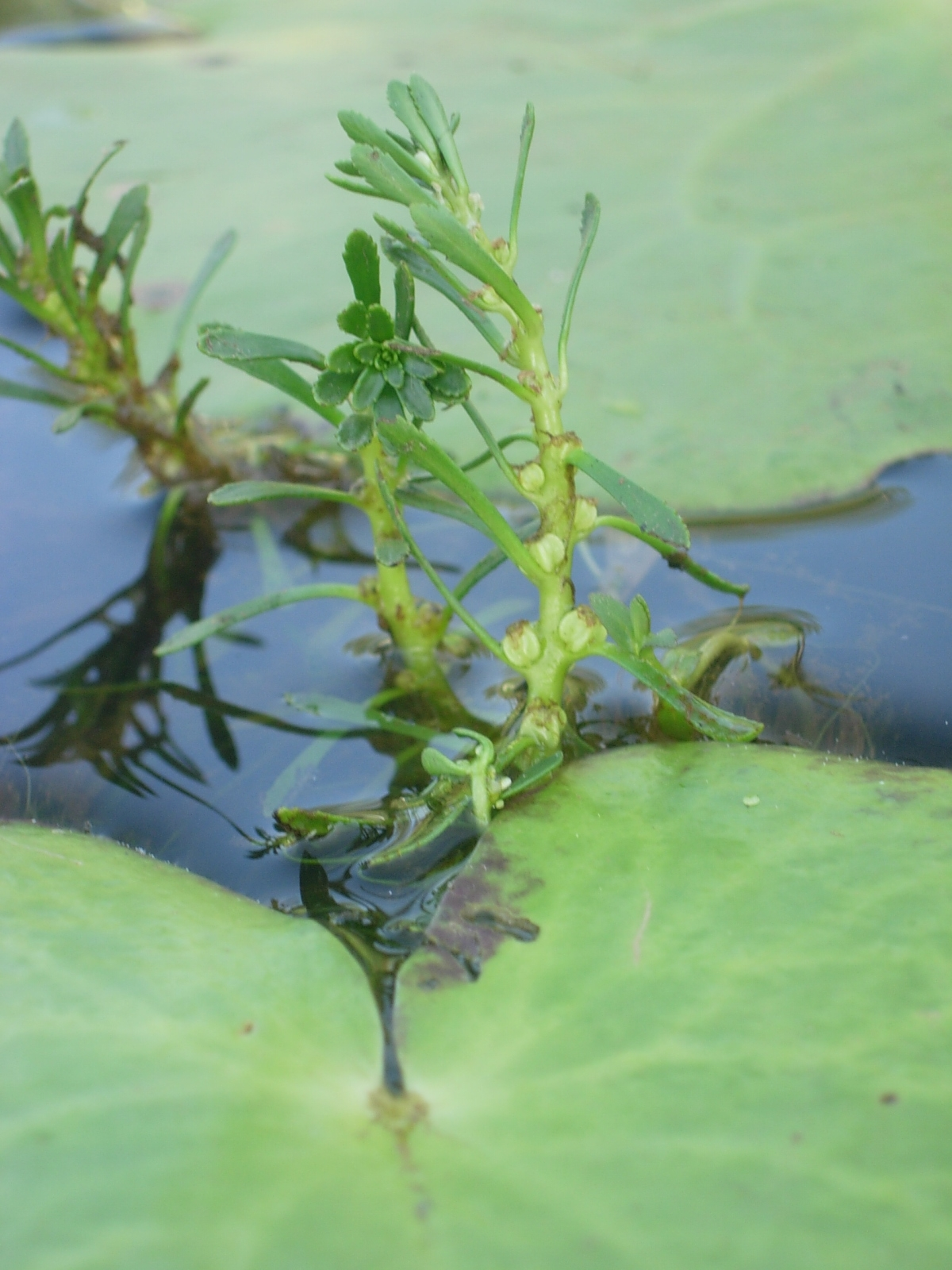

Conservation status
- Least Concern (IUCN 3.1)

Scientific classification
- Kingdom: Plantae
- Clade: Tracheophytes
- Clade: Angiosperms
- Clade: Eudicots
- Order: Saxifragales
- Family: Haloragaceae
- Genus: Myriophyllum
- Species: M. indicum

Binomial name
- Myriophyllum indicum Willd.

= Myriophyllum indicum =

Species of flowering plant native to India

Myriophyllum indicum is a species of water milfoil. It is native to India, where it grows in aquatic habitat such as ponds and streams. It generally grows over a meter long, with its stem lined with whorls of fleshy green leaves divided into many narrow lobes.
