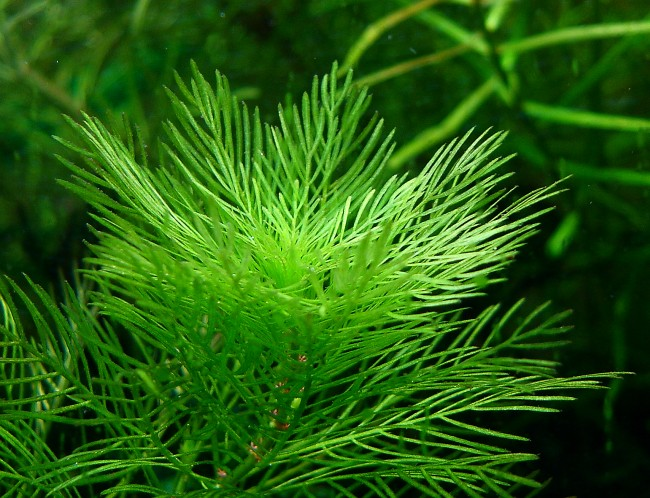

Scientific classification
- Kingdom: Plantae
- Clade: Tracheophytes
- Clade: Angiosperms
- Clade: Eudicots
- Order: Saxifragales
- Family: Haloragaceae
- Genus: Myriophyllum
- Species: M. mattogrossense

Binomial name
- Myriophyllum mattogrossense Hoehne

= Myriophyllum mattogrossense =

Species of flowering plant

Myriophyllum mattogrossense is a species of flowering plant native to the wetlands of South America. It is commonly used as an aquarium plant, but is in fact a mostly aquatic herb that can grow to 60 cm (24 in) in length. In nature, it is found almost exclusively in marshes, ephemeral ponds, streams, or on banks of mud.
