= Abby Maria Hemenway =

American teacher, author and historian

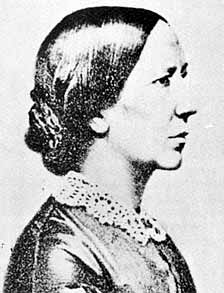
- Photo circa 1880
- Born: October 7, 1828; Ludlow, Vermont, US
- Died: February 24, 1890 (aged 61); Chicago, Illinois, US
- Resting place: Pleasant View Cemetery, Ludlow, Vermont, US
- Education: Black River Academy
- Occupations: Author and historian
- Years active: 1858–1890
- Notable work: Vermont Historical Gazetteer

Abby Maria Hemenway (October 7, 1828 – February 24, 1890) was an American teacher, writer and historian born in the state of Vermont.

== Early life ==
Abby Hemenway was born in Ludlow, Vermont on October 7, 1828. She attended Black River Academy, afterwards beginning a career as a teacher in Michigan.

Hemenway returned to Ludlow, became interested in publishing literature specific to Vermont, and attempted to attract supporters for her project. Refused backing from established printers and publishers, in 1858 she published on her own Poets and Poetry of Vermont, an anthology of verse by Green Mountain State writers.

== Historian, editor and publisher ==
The success of her volume of poetry encouraged her to continue in publishing, and she began the Vermont Historical Gazetteer. She planned to produce histories of every city and town in Vermont. Prior to Hemenway, publishing history usually meant biographies of famous military and political men and stories about the major events in which they took part. Hemenway advanced the concept of history as a social science by encouraging local authors to compile information on their areas and submit it to her for editing and publication, which placed the focus of Hemenway's Gazetteer on chronicling the day-to-day activities of Vermont's cities and towns, rather than focusing only on prominent individuals and events.

Many individuals prepared histories of their towns and cities and submitted them to Hemenway. For towns where she could not obtain the cooperation of a local author, Hemenway wrote the histories herself. In preparing for her first volume, Hemenway had to overcome the objections of several Middlebury College professors, some of whom had been working on town histories for Addison County. (Middlebury College is in Addison County.) These professors, all members of the Middlebury Historical Society, signed a letter to Hemenway insisting that her project was not feasible, asking how she expected to succeed when 40 men of the historical society working for 16 years had not. They described the project as "not a suitable work for a woman," and predicted that she would quit before she finished visiting half of the county. Undaunted, she set out to visit every town in person to recruit local authors.

Hemenway succeeded, and in 1861 she published the first volume of the Vermont Quarterly Gazetteer, which focused on the towns of Addison County.

Hemenway converted from the Baptist church to the Catholic Church in 1864, which attracted attention in an era when few New Englanders were Catholic. She never married, and had no children, attracting additional attention at a time when women were generally expected to marry young, remain at home, and raise families. In 1865 she published under a pen name a book of her own poetry, a life of the Virgin Mary called The Mystical Rose.

From 1867 to 1882 Hemenway published four more volumes of the renamed Vermont Historical Gazetteer. She had collected material for sixth and seventh volumes, but financial setbacks caused her to delay publication. She subsequently moved to Chicago, Illinois, where she continued to edit materials for the Gazetteer and even set type in her apartment in an effort to continue publication. When a fire destroyed materials for the sixth and seventh volumes, she collected them again and continued her work.

== Death and burial ==
In 1886 Hemenway was run over by a sleigh and suffered a broken collarbone. She continued working on the planned sixth volume until she died in Chicago after suffering a stroke on February 24, 1890. She is buried at Pleasant View Cemetery in Ludlow.

== Continued publication ==
Hemenway's sister published the sixth volume of the Gazetteer in 1891. The materials for the planned seventh volume passed through several hands until they were destroyed in a fire in North Carolina in 1911, so that volume was never published.

== Legacy ==
The six published volumes of the Vermont Historical Gazetteer (five plus the one Quarterly Gazetteer), which include local histories on 13 of Vermont's 14 counties (Windsor County is the exception), are still used as the primary historical reference on Vermont in the 18th and 19th Century. They contain invaluable information, including the names and terms of service for local office holders, names and terms of service for clergy members, and genealogical information on the early white residents of Vermont.

Hemenway's pioneering legacy as a publisher in an era when few women worked in the field, and her efforts to change the concept of history as a social science were rediscovered in recent years after publication of a 2001 biography, Deborah Pickman Clifford's The Passion of Abby Maria Hemenway.
