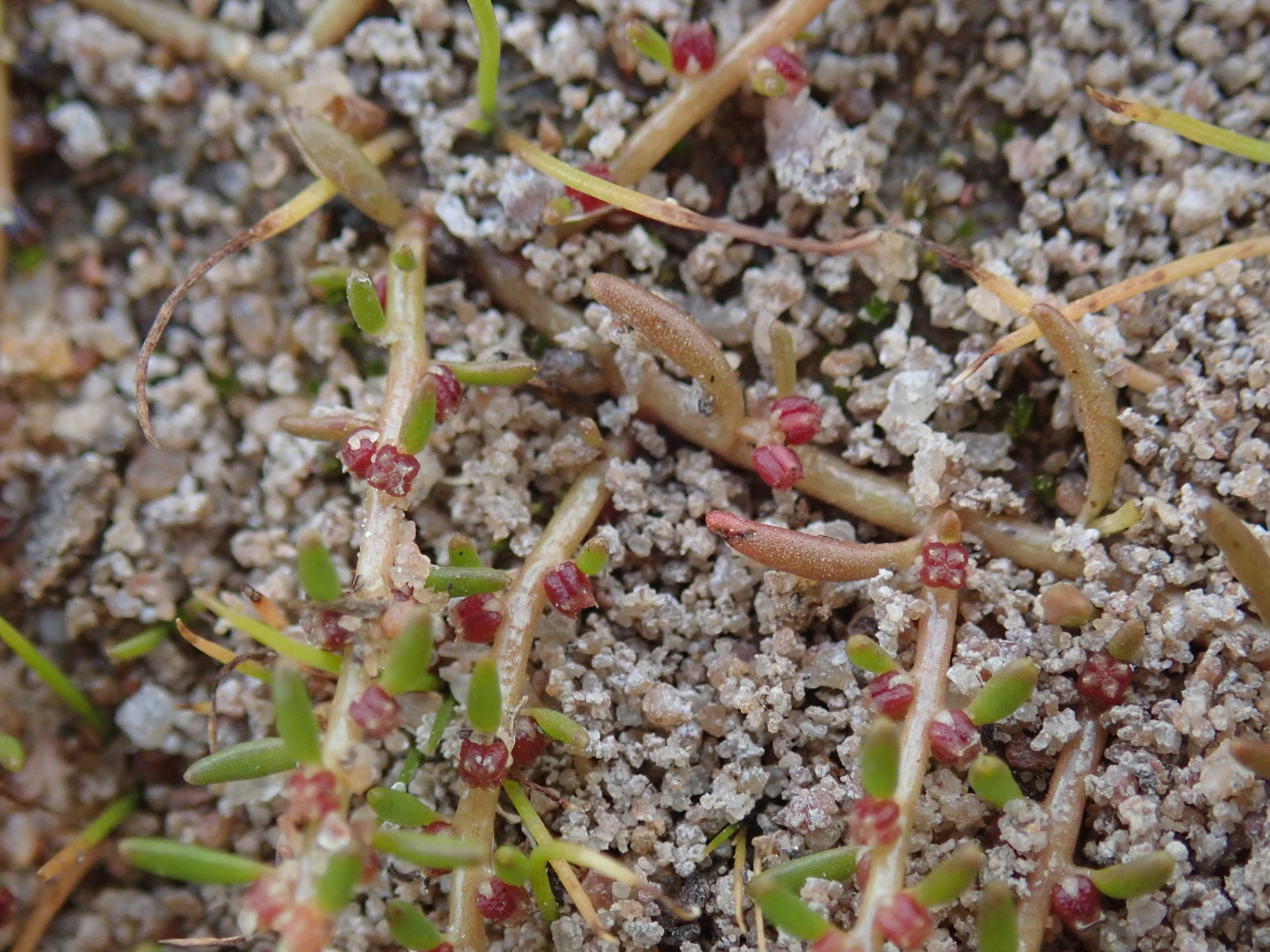
- Female flower
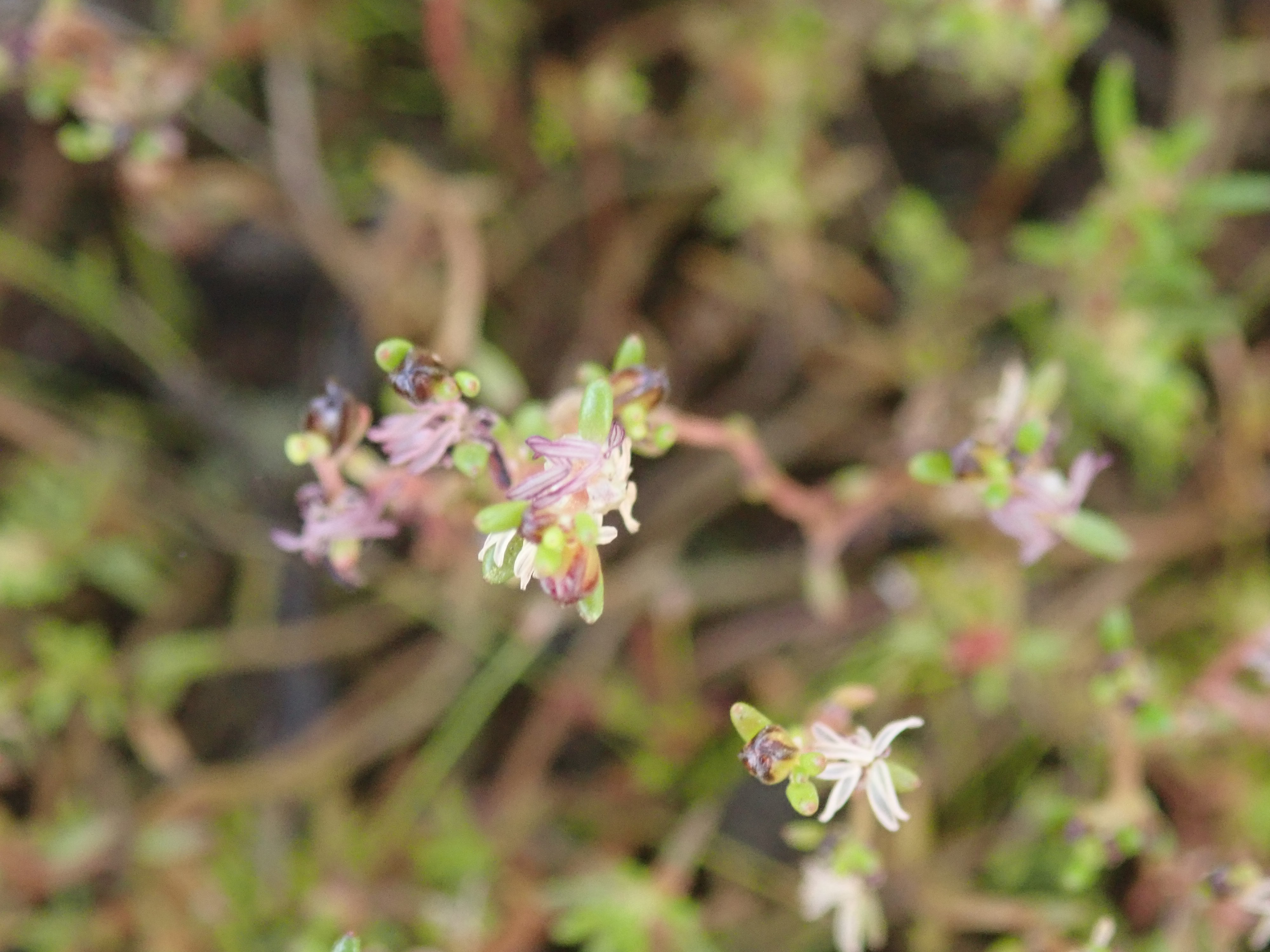
- Male flower

Scientific classification
- Kingdom: Plantae
- Clade: Tracheophytes
- Clade: Angiosperms
- Clade: Eudicots
- Order: Saxifragales
- Family: Haloragaceae
- Genus: Myriophyllum
- Species: M. implicatum

Binomial name
- Myriophyllum implicatum Orchard

= Myriophyllum implicatum =

Species of plant native to Australia

Myriophyllum implicatum is a species of water milfoil in the family Haloragaceae. Native to Australia, it occurs from the Gulf of Carpentaria, through southern Cape York Peninsula north-eastern New South Wales and eastern Queensland.

It was first described in 1986 by Anthony Orchard.

In New South Wales, it is listed as critically endangered, but under the Nature Conservation Act 1992 of Queensland it is listed as of least concern.

== Description ==
Myriophyllum implicatum is a creeping dioecious herb, which roots freely at its nodes. The alternate leaves are linear and entire and from 2.5 mm to 5 mm long. The flowers are axillary with the male flowers having a short pedicel, while the female flowers are sessile. The red-purple fruit is sessile and cube shaped.
