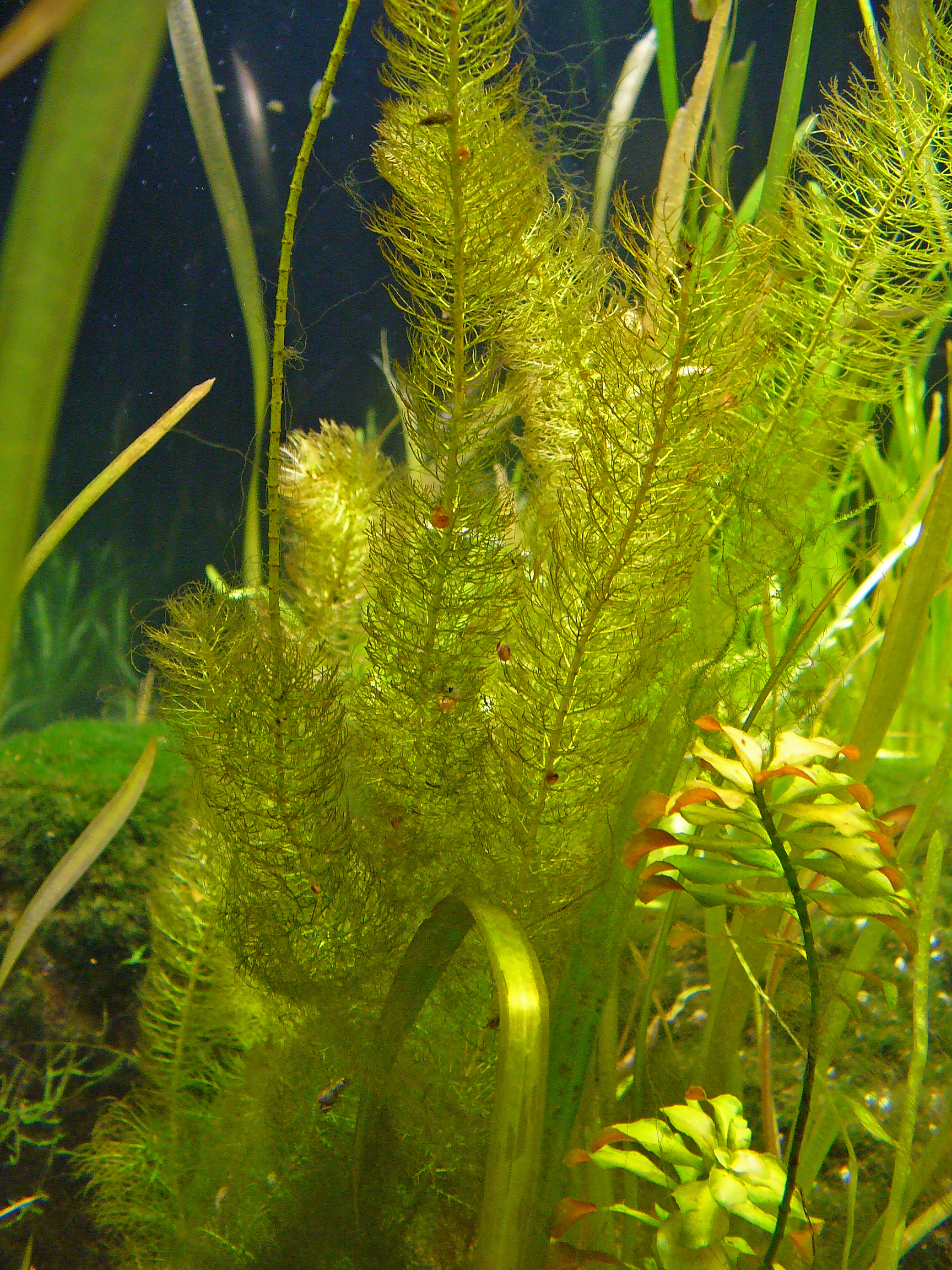
- Western watermilfoil (Myriophyllum hippuroides)

Scientific classification
- Kingdom: Plantae
- Clade: Tracheophytes
- Clade: Angiosperms
- Clade: Eudicots
- Order: Saxifragales
- Family: Haloragaceae
- Genus: Myriophyllum
- Species: M. hippuroides

Binomial name
- Myriophyllum hippuroides Torr. & A.Gray

= Myriophyllum hippuroides =

Species of flowering plant

Myriophyllum hippuroides is a species of watermilfoil known by the common name western watermilfoil. It is native to the west coast of North America, where it grows in aquatic habitat such as ponds and streams. It generally grows over a meter long, with its stem lined with whorls of fleshy green leaves divided into many narrow lobes. The leafy inflorescence is a spike of small flowers up to 12 centimeters (4.7 in) long which grows above the water's surface.
