= Ludlow (town), Vermont =

Ludlow, Vermont
- Town
- Ludlow, Vermont, from the east

- Location in Windsor County and the state of Vermont.
- Coordinates: 43°22′52″N 72°43′20″W
- Country: United States
- State: Vermont
- County: Windsor
- Communities: Ludlow; Grahamville; Smithville

Area
  - Total: 35.7 sq mi (92.5 km^{2})
  - Land: 35.2 sq mi (91.1 km^{2})
  - Water: 0.54 sq mi (1.4 km^{2})
- Elevation: 1,014 ft (309 m)

Population (2020)
  - Total: 2,172
  - Density: 61.8/sq mi (23.8/km^{2})
- Time zone: UTC-5 (Eastern (EST))
  - Summer (DST): UTC-4 (EDT)
- ZIP code: 05149
- Area code: 802
- FIPS code: 50-41275
- GNIS feature ID: 1462138
- Website: www.ludlow.vt.us

Ludlow is a town in Windsor County, Vermont, United States. The population was 2,172 at the 2020 census. Ludlow is the home of Okemo Mountain, a popular ski resort. Before becoming a ski destination, Ludlow was originally a mill town, and was the home of a General Electric plant until 1977. It was impacted by the flooding and natural disaster which ravaged Vermont in July 2023. The town of Ludlow was named after Ludlow, Massachusetts, which is less than 100 miles away. There is also, where the town started, a village of Ludlow located in the town.

== Geography ==
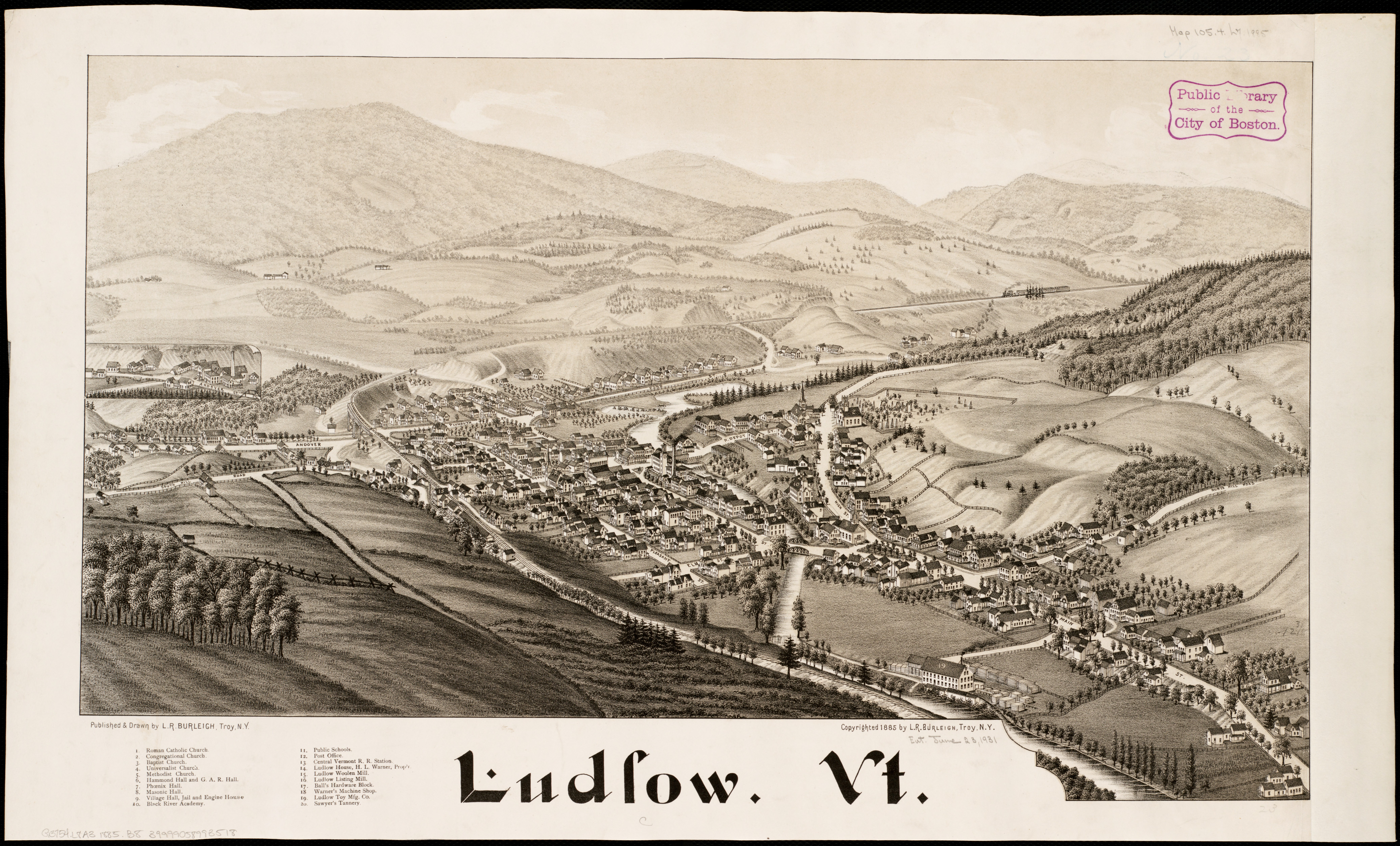
Lithograph of Ludlow from 1885 by L.R. Burleigh with a list of landmarks

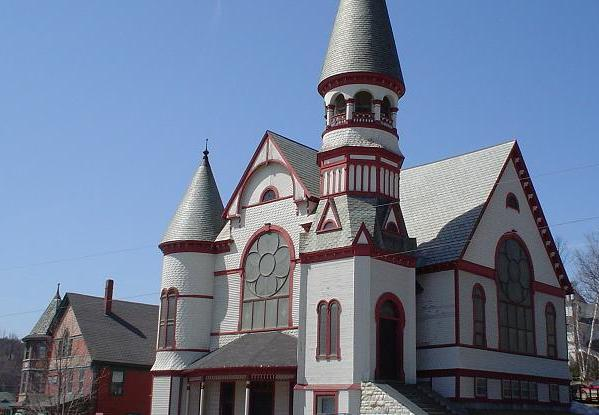
Ludlow architecture

According to the United States Census Bureau, the town has a total area of 35.7 square miles (92.5 km^{2}), of which 35.2 square miles (91.1 km^{2}) is land and 0.54 square miles (1.4 km^{2}), or 1.46%, is water. Within the town are located the incorporated village of Ludlow and the small hamlets of Grahamville and Smithville. Lake Rescue, a popular lake for recreational activities, is located about three miles north of the town center along Vermont Route 100. Vermont Route 103 passes east–west through the center of town. Interstate 91 does not pass through Ludlow, with the closest access points being Exit 6 in Rockingham and Exit 8 in Weathersfield.

=== Climate ===
Climate data for Ludlow (town) 43.3932 N, 72.7143 W, Elevation: 1,265 ft (386 m) (1991–2020 normals)
Month	Jan	Feb	Mar	Apr	May	Jun	Jul	Aug	Sep	Oct	Nov	Dec	Year
Mean daily maximum °F (°C)	29.5 (−1.4)	32.4 (0.2)	40.2 (4.6)	53.3 (11.8)	66.9 (19.4)	74.5 (23.6)	79.1 (26.2)	77.7 (25.4)	70.9 (21.6)	57.5 (14.2)	45.6 (7.6)	34.8 (1.6)	55.2 (12.9)
Daily mean °F (°C)	19.0 (−7.2)	20.7 (−6.3)	29.3 (−1.5)	41.5 (5.3)	54.0 (12.2)	62.4 (16.9)	66.9 (19.4)	65.1 (18.4)	57.8 (14.3)	46.2 (7.9)	35.8 (2.1)	25.7 (−3.5)	43.7 (6.5)
Mean daily minimum °F (°C)	8.5 (−13.1)	9.0 (−12.8)	18.3 (−7.6)	29.7 (−1.3)	41.1 (5.1)	50.3 (10.2)	54.7 (12.6)	52.6 (11.4)	44.7 (7.1)	34.9 (1.6)	26.1 (−3.3)	16.7 (−8.5)	32.2 (0.1)
Average precipitation inches (mm)	3.73 (95)	3.32 (84)	3.75 (95)	4.17 (106)	3.93 (100)	4.91 (125)	4.25 (108)	3.86 (98)	3.84 (98)	4.72 (120)	3.97 (101)	4.14 (105)	48.59 (1,235)
Average snowfall inches (cm)	21.00 (53.3)	17.50 (44.5)	20.70 (52.6)	5.60 (14.2)	0.10 (0.25)	0.00 (0.00)	0.00 (0.00)	0.00 (0.00)	0.00 (0.00)	1.00 (2.5)	7.60 (19.3)	17.10 (43.4)	90.6 (230.05)
Source 1: PRISM Climate Group
Source 2: NOAA (precipitation & snowfall)

== Demographics ==
Historical population
Census	Pop.	Note	%±
1790	179		—
1800	410		129.1%
1810	877		113.9%
1820	1,144		30.4%
1830	1,227		7.3%
1840	1,363		11.1%
1850	1,619		18.8%
1860	1,568		−3.2%
1870	1,827		16.5%
1880	2,005		9.7%
1890	1,768		−11.8%
1900	2,042		15.5%
1910	2,215		8.5%
1920	2,421		9.3%
1930	2,305		−4.8%
1940	2,458		6.6%
1950	2,428		−1.2%
1960	2,386		−1.7%
1970	2,463		3.2%
1980	2,414		−2.0%
1990	2,302		−4.6%
2000	2,449		6.4%
2010	1,963		−19.8%
2020	2,172		10.6%
U.S. Decennial Census

As of the census of 2000, there were 2,449 people, 1,060 households, and 658 families residing in the town. The population density was 69.4 people per square mile (26.8/km^{2}). There were 3,001 housing units at an average density of 85.1/sq mi (32.9/km^{2}). The racial makeup of the town was 98.41% White, 0.20% Black or African American, 0.16% Native American, 0.41% Asian, 0.20% from other races, and 0.61% from two or more races. Hispanic or Latino of any race were 0.24% of the population.

There were 1,060 households, out of which 24.3% had children under the age of 18 living with them, 49.5% were married couples living together, 9.9% had a female householder with no husband present, and 37.9% were non-families. 31.5% of all households were made up of individuals, and 11.8% had someone living alone who was 65 years of age or older. The average household size was 2.26 and the average family size was 2.80.

In the town, the population was spread out, with 21.0% under the age of 18, 6.5% from 18 to 24, 26.3% from 25 to 44, 27.6% from 45 to 64, and 18.7% who were 65 years of age or older. The median age was 43 years. For every 100 females, there were 96.2 males. For every 100 females age 18 and over, there were 93.3 males.

The median income for a household in the town was $36,969, and the median income for a family was $44,375. Males had a median income of $30,911 versus $22,179 for females. The per capita income for the town was $24,708. About 5.9% of families and 7.6% of the population were below the poverty line, including 8.6% of those under age 18 and 8.4% of those age 65 or over.

== Notable people ==
- Calvin Coolidge, 30th president of the United States; attended Black River Academy
- Abby Maria Hemenway, author and historian
- John F. Murphy, Sr., longtime legislator and politician
- Robert Newton Peck, children's author, most notably A Day No Pigs Would Die
- Belle L. Pettigrew, teacher, missionary
- Richard F. Pettigrew, lawyer, surveyor, land developer, and US senator from South Dakota
- John G. Sargent, U.S. Attorney General
- Edward Kirk Warren, businessman
