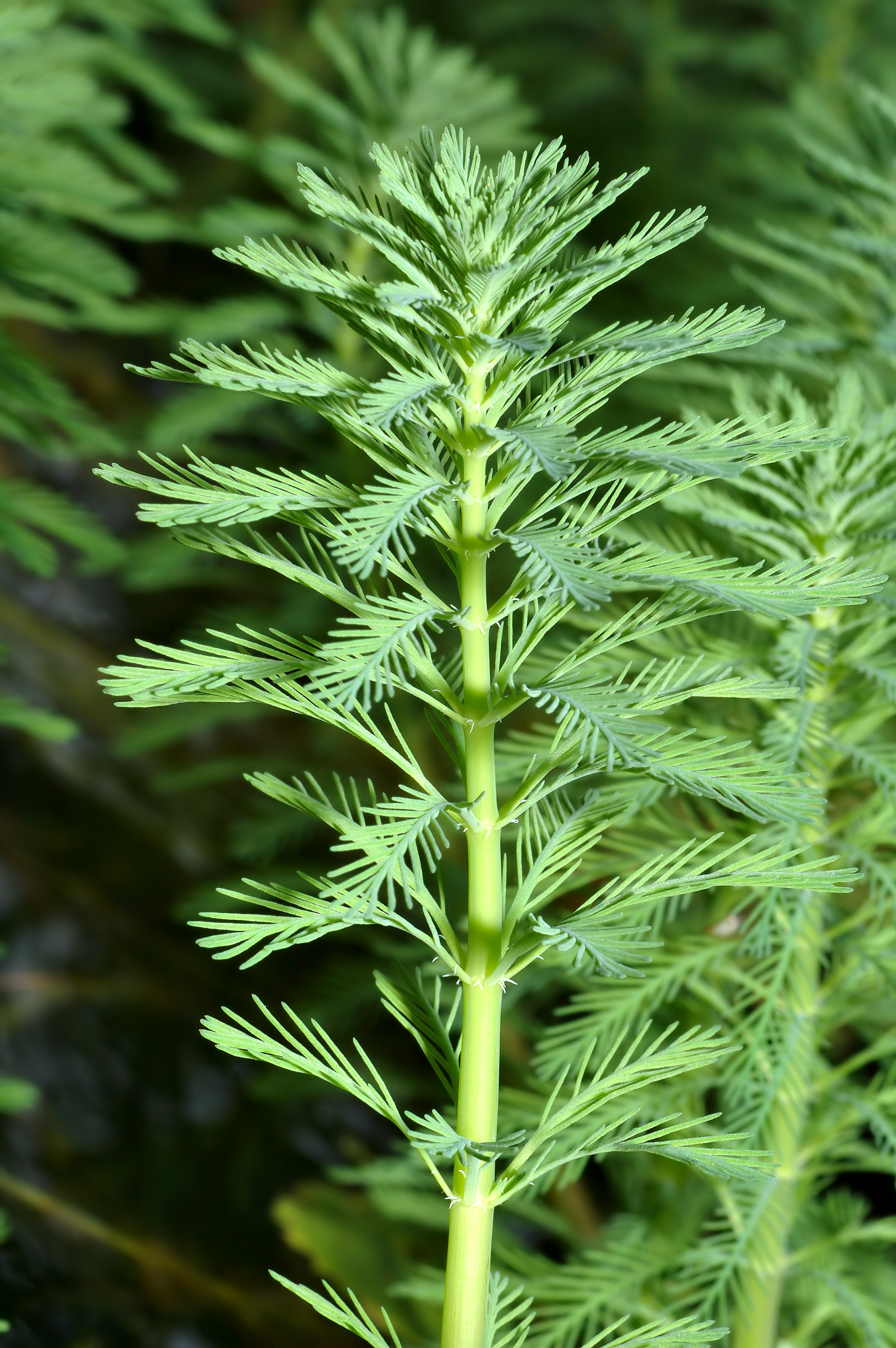
- Myriophyllum aquaticum

Scientific classification
- Kingdom: Plantae
- Clade: Embryophytes
- Clade: Tracheophytes
- Clade: Spermatophytes
- Clade: Angiosperms
- Clade: Eudicots
- Order: Saxifragales
- Family: Haloragaceae
- Genus: Myriophyllum; L.

Subgenera
- Myriophyllum; Meziella (Schindl.) M.L.Moody & D.H.Les; Brachytheca Schindl.

= Myriophyllum =

Genus of flowering plants in the water milfoil family

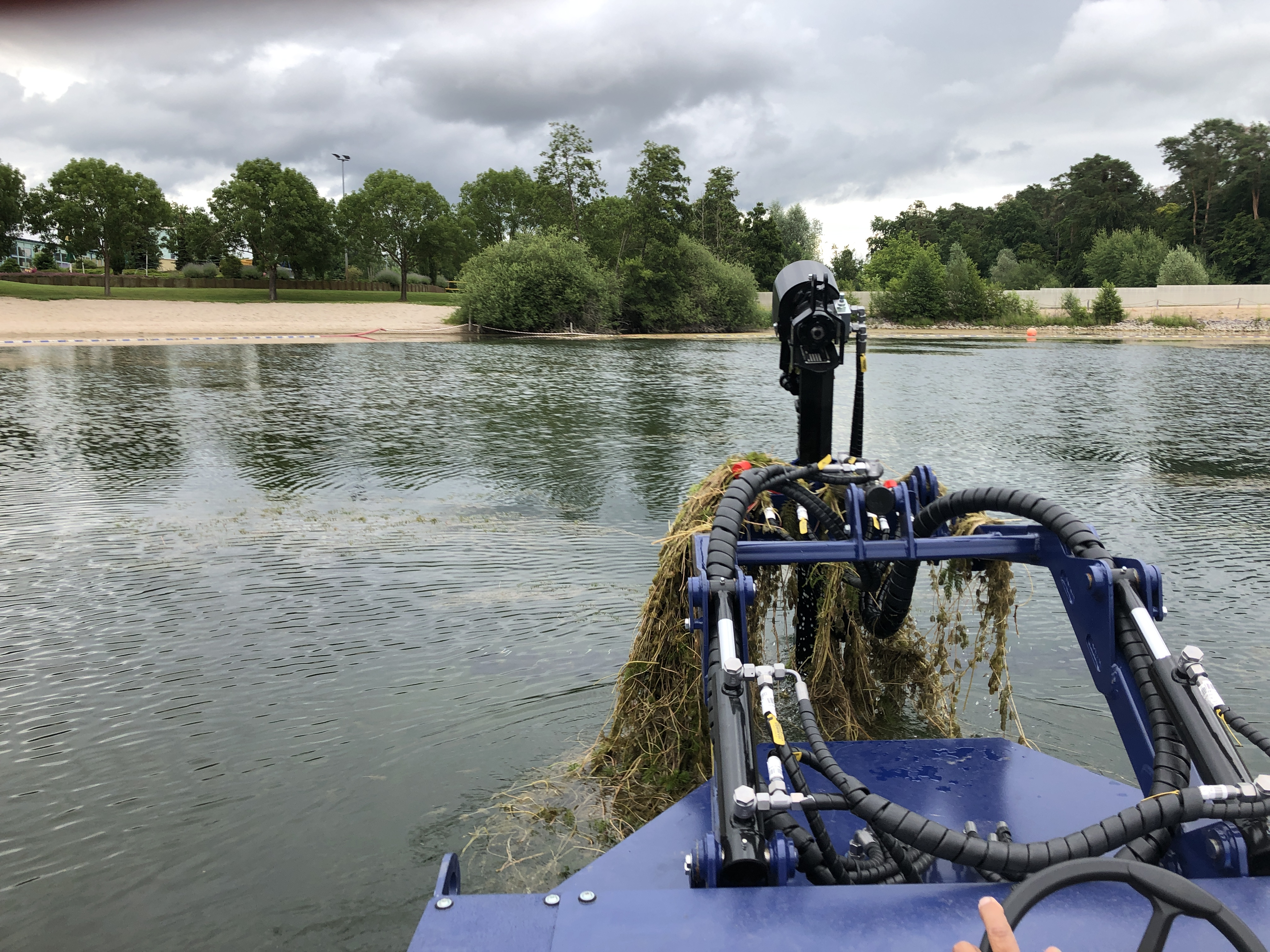
Cutting Myriophyllum spicatum with a T-cutting unit mounted on a mowing boat

Myriophyllum (water milfoil) is a genus of about 69 species of freshwater aquatic plants, with a cosmopolitan distribution. The centre of diversity for Myriophyllum is Australia with 43 recognized species (37 endemic).

These submersed aquatic plants are perhaps most commonly recognized for having elongate stems with air canals and whorled leaves that are finely, pinnately divided, but there are many exceptions. For example, the North American species M. tenellum has alternately arranged scale-like leaves, while many Australian species have small alternate or opposite leaves that lack dissection. The plants are usually heterophyllous; leaves above the water are often stiffer and smaller than the submerged leaves on the same plant and can lack dissection. Species can be monoecious or dioecious. In monoecious species, plants are hermaphrodite, while in dioecious species, plants are either male or female, the flowers are small, 4(2)-parted and usually borne in emergent leaf axils. The 'female' flowers usually lack petals. The fruit is a schizocarp that splits into four (two) nutlets at maturity.

The fruits and leaves can be an important food source for waterfowl, which are thought to be important for seed and clonal dispersal.

== Invasion and control ==
Three species (M. aquaticum, M. heterophyllum and M. spicatum) have aggressively invaded lakes, natural waterways and irrigation canals in North America. The U.S. states most affected have implemented control plans.

The Tennessee Valley Authority detected milfoil in its waters in the 1960s. It discounted milfoil's value as a food or feedstock and fought it with chemicals and lowering of water levels. It suggested that American lotus (Nelumbo lutea) might deny it sunlight.

The widespread invasive Eurasian watermilfoil (M. spicatum) is often controlled with herbicide containing diquat dibromide. Control can also be done through careful mechanical management, such as with lake mowers, but this is a fragmenting plant, and the fragments may grow back.

Mechanical management can include the use of a long-reach lake rake or aquatic weed razor blade tool. Using these tools is similar to lawn work. These tools are most effective before seeds set. Infestations can be prevented through the use of a Weed Roller or a LakeMaid. These are automated and unattended machines. Permits may be required by various states.

In 2007, Professor Sallie Sheldon of Middlebury College reported that an aquatic weevil (Euhrychiopsis lecontei), which eats nothing but milfoil, was an effective weapon against it.

Since roughly 2000, invasive milfoils have been managed by hand-harvesting. Several organizations in the New England states have undertaken successful lake-wide hand-harvesting management programs. Periodic maintenance is necessary; the species cannot be completely eradicated once established, but it can be reduced to manageable levels. Well-trained divers with proper techniques have effectively controlled milfoil and maintained lakes, such as in the Adirondack Park in Northern New York where chemicals, mechanical harvesters, and other management techniques are banned as disruptive.

== Taxonomy ==
A detailed molecular phylogenetic study enabled the construction of an infrageneric taxonomy but also revealed that another Haloragaceae genus, the monotypic Meziella Schindl., once thought to be extinct, was embedded within it, leading to its submersion within the former as Myriophyllum subgenus Meziella. This created three subgenera, further divided into sections and subsections:

Subgenera (type)

- Myriophyllum (M. spicatum L.)
- Meziella (Schindl.) M.L.Moody & D.H.Les (M. trifidum (Nees) M.L.Moody & D.H.Les.)
- Brachytheca Schindl. (M. variifolium Hook.f.)

=== List of selected species ===
- Myriophyllum alpinum
- Myriophyllum alterniflorum DC., 1815
- Myriophyllum amphibium
- Myriophyllum aquaticum
- Myriophyllum artesium
- Myriophyllum austropygmaeum
- Myriophyllum axilliflorum
- Myriophyllum balladoniense
- Myriophyllum bonii
- Myriophyllum callitrichoides
- Myriophyllum caput-medusae
- Myriophyllum coronatum
- Myriophyllum costatum
- Myriophyllum crispatum
- Myriophyllum dicoccum
- Myriophyllum drummondii
- Myriophyllum decussatum
- Myriophyllum echinatum
- Myriophyllum exasperatum
- Myriophyllum farwellii
- Myriophyllum filiforme
- Myriophyllum glomeratum
- Myriophyllum gracile
- Myriophyllum heterophyllum
- Myriophyllum hippuroides
- Myriophyllum humile
- Myriophyllum implicatum
- Myriophyllum indicum Willd., 1805
- Myriophyllum integrifolium
- Myriophyllum jacobsii
- Myriophyllum lapidicola
- Myriophyllum latifolium
- Myriophyllum laxum
- Myriophyllum limnophilum
- Myriophyllum lophatum
- Myriophyllum mattogrossense
- Myriophyllum mezianum
- Myriophyllum muelleri
- Myriophyllum muricatum
- Myriophyllum oguraense
- Myriophyllum oliganthum
- Myriophyllum petraeum
- Myriophyllum papillosum
- Myriophyllum pedunculatum
- Myriophyllum pinnatum
- Myriophyllum porcatum
- Myriophyllum propinquum
- Myriophyllum pygmaeum
- Myriophyllum quitense
- Myriophyllum robustum
- Myriophyllum rubricaule
- Myriophyllum salsugineum
- Myriophyllum siamense
- Myriophyllum sibiricum
- Myriophyllum simulans
- Myriophyllum spicatum
- Myriophyllum striatum
- Myriophyllum tenellum
- Myriophyllum tetrandrum
- Myriophyllum tillaeoides
- Myriophyllum trachycarpum
- Myriophyllum trifidum
- Myriophyllum triphyllum
- Myriophyllum tuberculatum
- Myriophyllum ussuriense
- Myriophyllum variifolium
- Myriophyllum verrucosum
- Myriophyllum verticillatum
- Myriophyllum votschii

== Bibliography ==
- Anderson, Lars W.J. (ed.). Proceedings of the first international symposium on water milfoil (Myriophyllum spicatum) and related Haloragaceae species. July 23–24, 1985 (PDF). Vancouver, BC: Aquatic Plant Management Society, United States Environmental Protection Agency. Archived from the original (PDF) on 26 August 2021.
- Moody, M.L.; Les, D. H. (2010). "Systematics of the Aquatic Angiosperm genus Myriophyllum (Haloragaceae)" (PDF). Systematic Botany. 35 (1): 121–139. Bibcode:2010SysBo..35..121M. doi:10.1600/036364410790862470. S2CID 52999042.
- Orchard, A. E. (1979). "Myriophyllum (Haloragaceae) in Australasia. I. New Zealand: A Revision of the Genus and a Synopsis of the Family". Brunonia. 2: 247–287. CiteSeerX 10.1.1.492.3964. doi:10.1071/bru9850173.
- Orchard, A. E. (1986). "Myriophyllum (Haloragaceae) in Australasia. II. The Australian species". Brunonia. 8: 173–291. doi:10.1071/bru9850173.
- Yu, D.; Wangerin, Walther Leonard; Li, Z. Y.; Funston, A. M. (2002). "Taxonomic revision of the genus Myriophyllum (Haloragaceae) in China". Rhodora. 104: 396–421.
- "Milfoil munching weevils prove their worth at Fairfield Pond". Newsroom. Vermont: Middlebury College. 6 September 2007.
