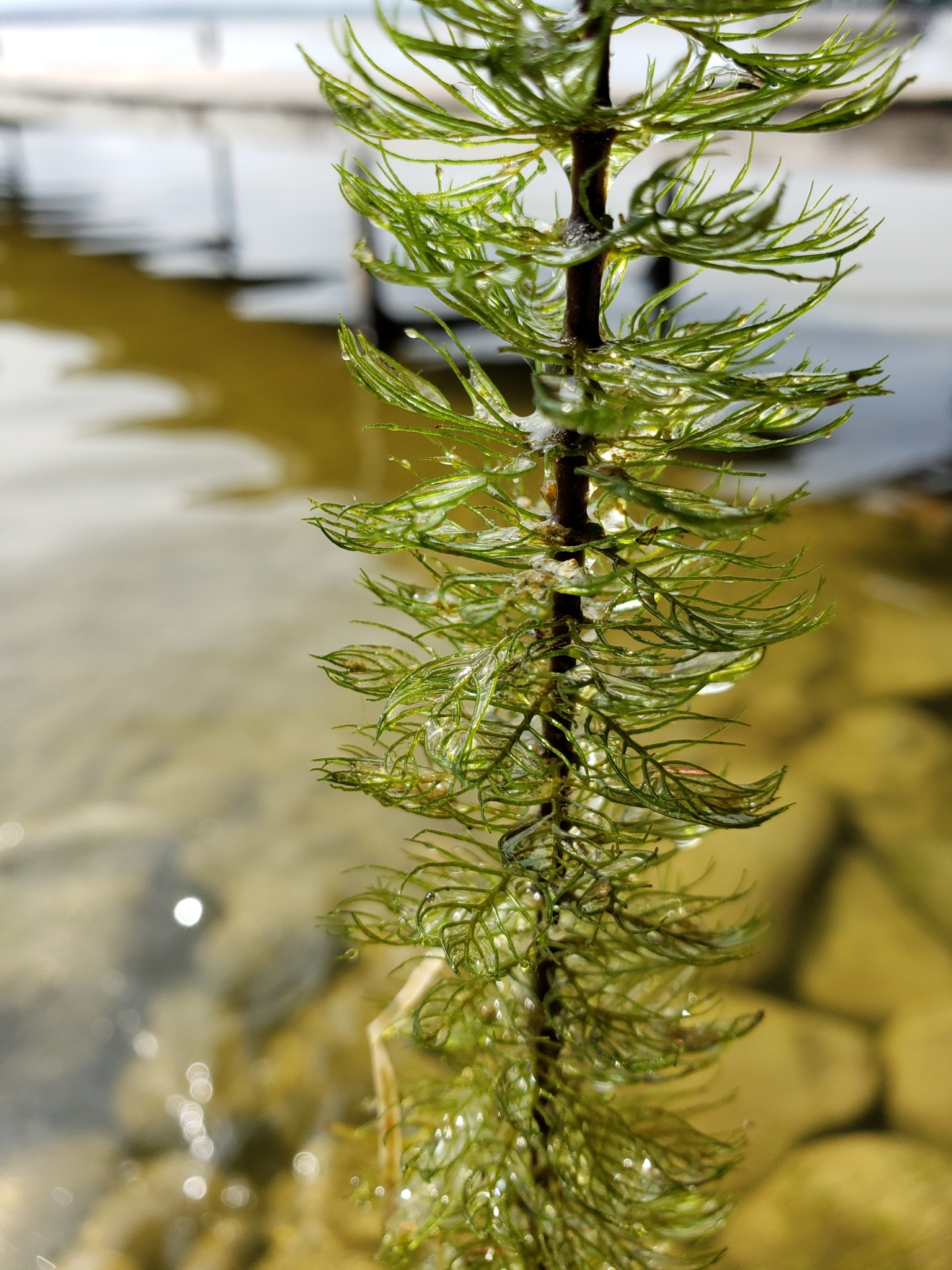

Conservation status
- Least Concern (IUCN 3.1)

- Secure (NatureServe)

Scientific classification
- Kingdom: Plantae
- Clade: Tracheophytes
- Clade: Angiosperms
- Clade: Eudicots
- Order: Saxifragales
- Family: Haloragaceae
- Genus: Myriophyllum
- Species: M. sibiricum

Binomial name
- Myriophyllum sibiricum Kom., 1914

Synonyms
- List: Myriophyllum exalbescens Fernald (1919); Myriophyllum exalbescens var. magdalenense (Fernald) Á.Löve (1961); Myriophyllum magdalenense Fernald (1924); Myriophyllum spicatum var. capillaceum Lange (1880); Myriophyllum spicatum var. exalbescens (Fernald) Jeps. (1925); Myriophyllum spicatum subsp. exalbescens (Fernald) Hultén (1947); Myriophyllum spicatum var. muricatum Maxim. (1873)

= Myriophyllum sibiricum =

Plant species in the watermilfoil family

Myriophyllum sibiricum is a species of water milfoil known by the common names shortspike watermilfoil, northern watermilfoil, and Siberian water-milfoil. It is native to Russia, China, and much of North America, where it grows in aquatic habitat such as ponds and streams. It generally grows over a meter long, its green stem drying white. It is lined with whorls of fanlike green leaves divided into many narrow, feathery lobes.

== Description ==
The erect inflorescence is a spike of small flowers up to 8 centimetres (3 inches) long which grows above the water's surface.
