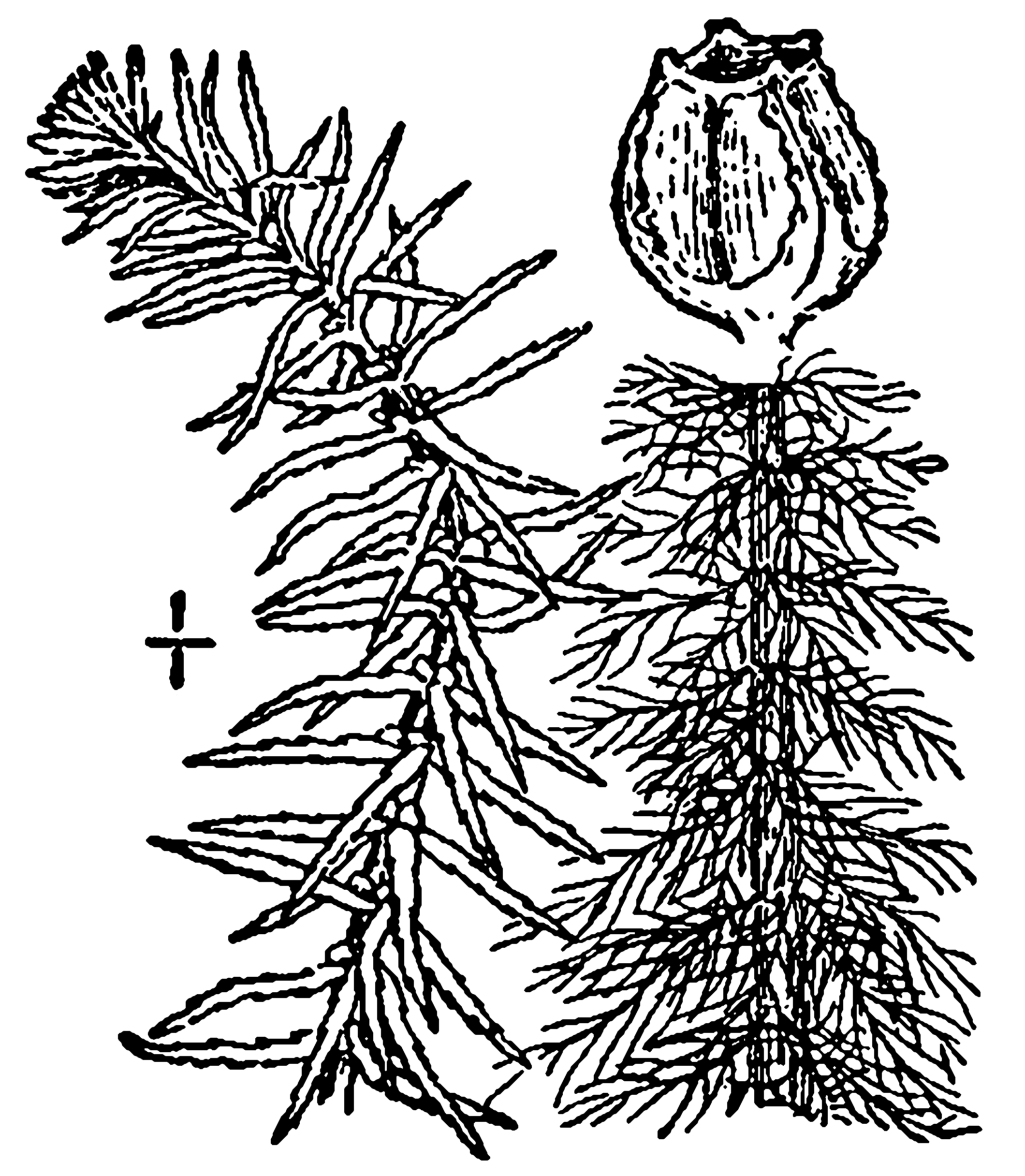

Scientific classification
- Kingdom: Plantae
- Clade: Tracheophytes
- Clade: Angiosperms
- Clade: Eudicots
- Order: Saxifragales
- Family: Haloragaceae
- Genus: Myriophyllum
- Species: M. pinnatum

Binomial name
- Myriophyllum pinnatum (Walter) Britton, Sterns & Poggenb.

= Myriophyllum pinnatum =

Species of flowering plant

Myriophyllum pinnatum, common names cutleaf water-milfoil, green parrot's-feather, and pinnate water-milfoil, is a species of Myriophyllum.

== Conservation status in the United States ==
It is listed as endangered in Connecticut. It is also listed as endangered in Indiana New Jersey, New York (state), as "historical" in Kentucky, as threatened in Rhode Island and Tennessee, and as a special concern in Massachusetts.
