= Okemo Mountain =

Ski resort in Vermont, United States

Okemo

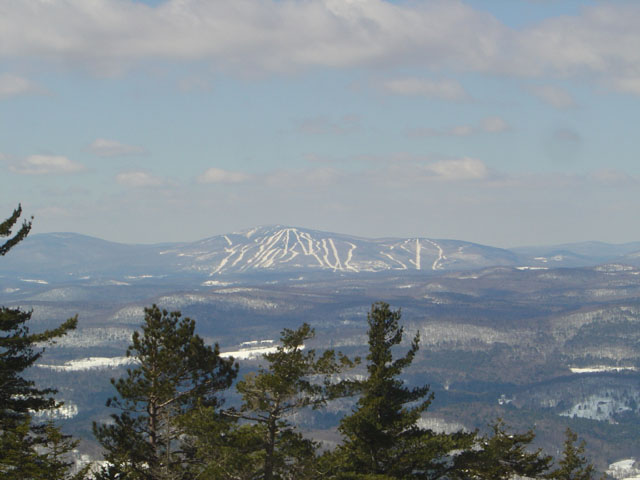
- Okemo as seen from Mount Ascutney
- Interactive map of Okemo
- Location: Ludlow Mountain; Ludlow, Vermont, U.S.
- Nearest city: Londonderry, Vermont 12 miles (19 km) south Rutland, Vermont 25 miles (40 km) northwest Boston, Massachusetts 120 miles (190 km) southeast
- Coordinates: 43°24′5″N 72°43′0″W
- Status: Operating
- Owner: Vail Resorts
- Vertical: 2,200 feet (670 m)
- Top elevation: 3,344 feet (1,019 m)
- Base elevation: 1,134 feet (346 m)
- Skiable area: 667 acres (270 ha)
- Trails: 123
- Longest run: 4.5 miles (7.2 km)
- Lift system: 13 chairs, 7 surface lifts
- Terrain parks: Yes, 8
- Snowfall: 16.6 feet (5.1 m)
- Snowmaking: Yes
- Website: Okemo Mountain Resort

Okemo Mountain Resort is a ski resort located in the town of Ludlow, Vermont, United States. Parents Magazine rated it the Top US Family Snow Resort, and Visitor's Choice on the Snow rated it as Number 1 Beginner Terrain in Vermont.

== History ==
Okemo was founded in 1955 by a group of local businessmen. Operations officially began January 31, 1956, with four inches (102 mm) of snow and trails serviced by two Poma surface lifts. The lower poma cost 20 cents per ride, while the upper one cost 60 cents. The early 1960s saw the introduction of four more Pomas. In these years, Okemo had a reputation of operating with all Poma platter lifts, while other ski areas used double chair lifts to serve advanced ski terrain. The first chairlift, the Sachem double, was introduced in 1965. Along with all of these improvements, Okemo began to offer slopeside lodging starting in 1961. In 1963, Okemo purchased its first groomer, a Tucker Sno-Cat model. Snowmaking was first used, starting with the lower part of the mountain, in 1966.

The 1970s brought tough times for Okemo. There were fires, floods, and competition from the West. In 1982, the owners decided to sell the resort rather than go into bankruptcy. Tim and Dianne Mueller purchased the resort on August 2, 1982. While the resort was in danger of going bankrupt and the facilities were outdated, the Muellers wanted to preserve the historic feeling. They kept the name Okemo, which they claim is Native American for "All Come Home", although there is no evidence as to which Native American language this comes from. According to the scholarship of John C. Huden, the name means Chieftain in Chippewa and a louse in Abnaki. Certain trail names also continue to preserve this sentiment, such as Chief, Tomahawk, Wardance, Sachem, and Arrow, all of which are present on today's trail map.

Since 1982, Okemo has grown in many different ways. The facilities have been expanded in every aspect, including new chairlifts, trails, lodges, and snowmaking. The Muellers later also acquired Mount Sunapee Resort in Newbury, New Hampshire, and Mount Crested Butte in Crested Butte, Colorado.

On December 6, 2008, the Muellers sold Okemo, Crested Butte and Mount Sunapee to a REIT, CNL Lifestyle Properties in a lease-back deal valued at over $130 million. CNL sold the properties to Och-Ziff Capital Management in 2016. Och-Ziff owned the underlying assets of the resorts, while the Muellers continued to run the resorts.

In June 2018, Vail Resorts acquired Okemo, along with the Muellers' other resorts, at a purchase price of $82 million and $155 million to buy out the operating leases.

== Mountain statistics ==
The base of Okemo stands at 1,144 feet (346 m) above sea level, and the summit is 3,344 feet (1,019 m). This gives Okemo the largest vertical drop in southern Vermont, 2,200 feet (670 m). The mountain has a total of 123 trails spread across 667 acres (2.70 km^{2}) skiable terrain. Trail difficulty is almost evenly divided between novice, intermediate, and advanced/expert. A paved road, named Mountain Road, runs along the mountainside is used as a ski trail in the winter, making it Okemo's longest trail at 4.5 miles (7.2 km). Mountain Road can be driven during the summer and has parking spots for scenic viewing of the valley.

98% (654 acres) of the trail area is covered by snowmaking; one of the highest percentages in the East. The snowmaking pond has a total water capacity of 155 million gallons. In addition, the quality of the grooming is ranked sixth in the nation by SKI Magazine readers.

=== Trails ===
The trails built as each new part of the mountain have had some sort of theme, such as the Native American names on the main mountain and the astronomy-related names at the top of Jackson Gore. The following lists all of the trails by rating and name, alphabetically:

At the moment, 26 October 2026 UTC [refresh], Okemo Mountain has 121 trails, consisting of various slopes and glades.

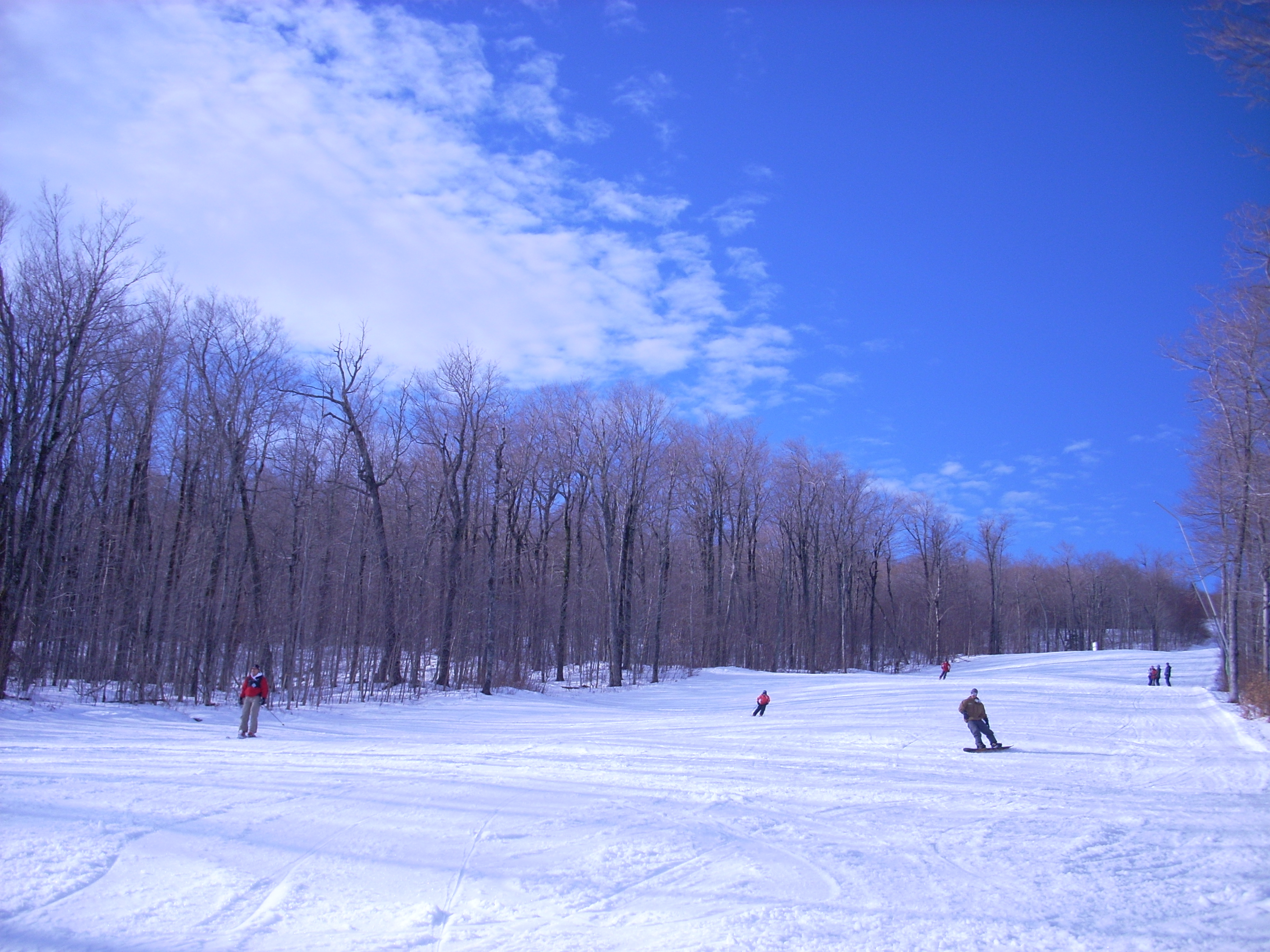
The trail sidewinder

Easier	More Difficult	Most Difficult	Most Difficult (Use Extreme Caution)
Bright Star Basin	Beeline	Black Out (m)	Big Bang (m)
Buckhorn	Blue Moon	Blind Faith (t)	Black Hole (g)
Bull Run	Boomerang	Challenger (n)	Broken Arrow (g)
Coleman Brook	Catnap (n)	Defiance	Double Diamond (g)
Day Break	Chute	Eclipse	Forrest Bump (g)
Dream Weaver	Countdown	Exhibition	Loose Spruce (g)
Easy Rider	Cutter's Folly	Fast Lane (n) (m)	Outrage (g)
Easy Street	Double Dipper	Ledges (m)	Rolling Thunder (n)
Roundhouse Run	Drop Off	Lower Sel's	Supernova (g)
Expresso	Express Lane	Nor'Easter	White Lightning (n)
Fairway	French Connection (n)	Punch Line (m)	
Fast Track	Heaven's Gate	Quantum Leap	Terrain Parks
Galaxy Bowl	Jolly Green Giant	Searle's Way (n)	AMP Energy Superpipe
Home Stretch	Line Drive	Sel's Choice (m)	Broken Arrow
Homeward Bound	Link	Side Kick (n)	Bounder Park
Inn Bound	Lower Chief	Stump Jumper	Gordon's Garden
Jack-A-Lope	Lower Fall Line	The Plunge (m)	NASTAR Race Arena
Kettle Brook Trail	Lower Limelight	Triplesec (m)	Progression Park
Ledgewood Trail	Lower Tomahawk	Turkey Shoot	Terrain Park on Tomahawk
Lift Line	Lower World Cup	Upper Chief	Homeward Bound Park
Lower Arrow	Moment's Rest	Upper Fall Line	The Dew Zone
Lower Mountain Road	Moon Dog	Upper Limelight (m)	Blackout
Mountain Road	Moonshadow	Upper Wild Thing (n) (m)	
Open Slope	Off The Rim (n)	Upper World Cup	
Promenade	Ridge Runner	Vortex	
Rising Star	Rimrock	Wardance	
Sachem	Route 103	Wild Thing	
Ski School Slope	Rum Run (n)		
Snowtrak	Sapphire		
Southern Crossing	Scooter		
Spur Line	Screamin' Demon		
Sun Dog	Side Out		
Sweet Solitude	Sidewinder		
Suncatcher	Sprint		
Sunset Strip	Sprout		
Switchback	The Narrows (g)		
Upper Mountain Road (n)	The Shadows (g)		
Village Run	Timberline		
Zip	Tree Dancer (g)		
	Tuckered Out		
	Upper Arrow		
	Upper Tomahawk		
	Whispering Pines (g)		
	Whistler (g)		

- (g) – gladed trail with trees
- (n) – natural trail without snowmaking (not including glades), although many of these are groomed after a snowfall to have a solid base
- (m) – trail with moguls regularly when conditions provide
- See also Okemo Trail Map

=== Lifts ===
Okemo has 21 chairlifts, including 1 high speed detachable 6-pack chair with protective bubbles and heated seats, 1 new high speed detachable 6-pack chair, 9 quad chairs (4 high speed detachable quads - one with protective bubble that's been newly relocated), and 2 triple chairs, all constructed by Poma or Leitner-Poma. There are seven surface lifts, including six carpets and one t-bar that takes riders to the top of the halfpipe. Excluding carpets, these lifts combine to give the mountain a total uphill capacity of ~29,850 people per hour.

Summary of Lifts at Okemo
Surface Lifts	Triple chairlifts	Fixed grip quads	High speed quads	High speed six packs
F-10 Carpet	Black Ridge	Glades Peak	Coleman Brook Express	Sunburst Six (Bubble w/ Heated Seats)
Orion's Belt Carpet	Morning Star	Sachem	Solitude Express	Quantum Six
Skywalker Carpet		South Ridge Quad A	South Face Express	
Snow Stars Carpet		South Ridge Quad B	Evergreen Summit Express (Bubble)	
Stargazer Carpet		Sunshine		
Starlight Carpet				
The Pull				

South Ridge Quad B at the Clocktower base area utilizes loading and unloading conveyors. This is the first unloading carpet to be used in the United States. The use of this system makes it easier for beginners to load and unload. these carpets have since been removed.

=== Lodges ===
- Clock Tower Base Lodge: located at the base of South Ridge Quads A & B at the main entrance of the mountain, with daycare, ski shop, rentals, tickets, and food from the cafeteria, Caffé Origins, and the Sitting Bull Restaurant & Bar
- Jackson Gore Base Lodge: located at the base of the Jackson Gore area and Coleman Brook Express Quad, with daycare, ski shop, rentals, tickets, and food from the cafeteria, selling more specialties than the other lodges, and Siena restaurant on the second floor; also attached is hotel-like lodging and Coleman Brook Tavern restaurant
- Sugar House: located near the base of the Sunburst Six, with many unique dining opportunities, including a deli, a grille, pizza, and a café
- Summit Lodge: located at the top of the main mountain, accessible from the Sunburst Six, Green Ridge Triple, and Glades Peak Quad, with a cafeteria, bar, and Asian cuisine
- Solitude Day Lodge: located at the base of the Solitude area and Solitude Express Quad, with a full-service restaurant—Epic—and a small snack area

== Skiing ==
There are five main areas at Okemo, each with at least one high-speed detachable quad. The main mountain is serviced primarily by the Sunburst Six. The 1,700-vertical-foot cruisers, such as Chief, World Cup, and Jolly Green Giant are accessed from the Sunburst Six. When lift lines become crowded the Evergreen Summit Express can be used to reach the top of the mountain instead, although it loads at the middle of the mountain. The main area also includes runs directed at more advanced skiers, such as Searle's Way, Sel's Choice, Nor'Easter, Defiance, and the Amp Energy Superpipe (Amp Energy sponsored halfpipe and snowboard park).

Solitude, to the north of the main mountain (right as one looks uphill), offers about 1,100 vertical feet. The Solitude area also has its own base lodge, hotel accommodations, and private trailside homes. Most of the trails in this area are intermediate cruisers, though some blacks exist, such as Exhibition and The Plunge.

The South Face area, to the south (left), has the highest peak on the mountain, faces the sun in the morning, and is served by a 1,100-foot (340 m) high-speed lift. This area is known for its more difficult terrain, including most of the double-black diamond trails. While some of the main thoroughfares are groomed nightly in this area, trails like Outrage and Forest Bump remain natural. There are also mogul trails in this area, such as Punch Line; Okemo marks its mogul trails. Okemo is also known for their bailout lanes, groomed sections on bump run where one can escape from the moguls.

The final area, on the far north (right), is Jackson Gore, complete with its own access road, lodge, ski school, and most other amenities also found at the Base Lodge. This area, served by one high-speed quad and one six-pack, has some of the steeper terrain on the mountain, as well as the standard green and blue trails. Access from the main mountain is provided through Jackson Gore Junction, over a bridge onto Blue Moon. An alternative is Jack-a-lope or Moonshadow to Southern Crossing, although this goes to the base area only rather than the lift to the peak.

Okemo's fifth area and its smallest is Glades Peak, between the main mountain and the South Face, serviced by one fixed-grip quad. It provides access to most trails on the mountain, including a couple that is exclusively served by its lift.

== Summer activities ==
The 2.9 miles (4.7 km) Healdville Trail for hikers starts at a small parking lot off Vermont Route 103 and ascends to the fire tower at the top of the mountain. Visitors can also drive up the mountain on the paved road known as the trail "Mountain Road" in the winter. For road cyclists, Mountain Road has rated the 142nd most challenging climb in the United States https://pjammcycling.com/climb/516.Okemo, and the 4th most difficult in Vermont. https://pjammcycling.com/zone/78.Vermont There are lookout points to stop and take in the scenery along the way.

Across Route 103 sits the 18-hole, par-70 Okemo Valley golf course, rated the best public course in Vermont for 2006 by Golfweek. Run by Okemo, it is the first Heathland-style golf course built in Vermont. The whole course measures 6,400 yards (5,900 m) and hosts two events on the Vermont PGA Tour. Other amenities include a 12,000 ft^{2} (1,100 m^{2}) year-round indoor training center, an 18-acre (73,000 m^{2}) outdoor learning center, a clubhouse, a pro shop, and Yamaha golf carts. Adjacent to the course is Willie Dunn's Grille, a restaurant open every day during the summer (with breaks in between) for lunch and dinner. The Muellers also own Tater Hill Golf Club in Windham, Vermont, 22 miles (35 km) away from Ludlow. In mid-2023, Okemo Valley Golf Course was sold by Vail Resorts to a group of local investors. It has since been renamed Fox Run Golf Club and continues to operate under this new local ownership.

In 2010 Okemo opened up the Adventure Zone in the base of Jackson Gore. The Adventure Zone is a year-round attraction which includes: The Timber Ripper, the first mountain coaster in Vermont, Lumberin' Cal mini-golf, The Maples disc golf course and the Stump Jumper Bungee Trampoline. New for the summer of 2012, the Canopy tour zip lines opened up for year-round access.

Okemo Mountain Resort has added lift-served mountain biking to its lineup of summer and fall amenities, in the heart of Vermont's Green Mountains. Okemo's South Ridge Quad-A provides access to more than three miles of trails in the resort's Clock Tower base area.

== Wind power ==
During August 2006, the Muellers announced they were switching to wind power for the upcoming ski season at their three resorts, Okemo, Mount Sunapee, and Crested Butte. The Muellers have bought 27 million kilowatt hours of renewable energy certificates from Sterling Planet, through a contract with Gunnison County Electric Association in Colorado, for about 15% more money than they were paying previously. It is estimated that this will prevent 18,800 tons of carbon dioxide emissions on a yearly basis.

== Vail Resorts ==
On June 4, 2018, Vail Resorts, a mountain management company based in Colorado, purchased Okemo as well as her sister resorts, Crested Butte and Mount Sunapee as part of an $82 million deal with Triple Peaks, LLC, which operates the three resorts.
