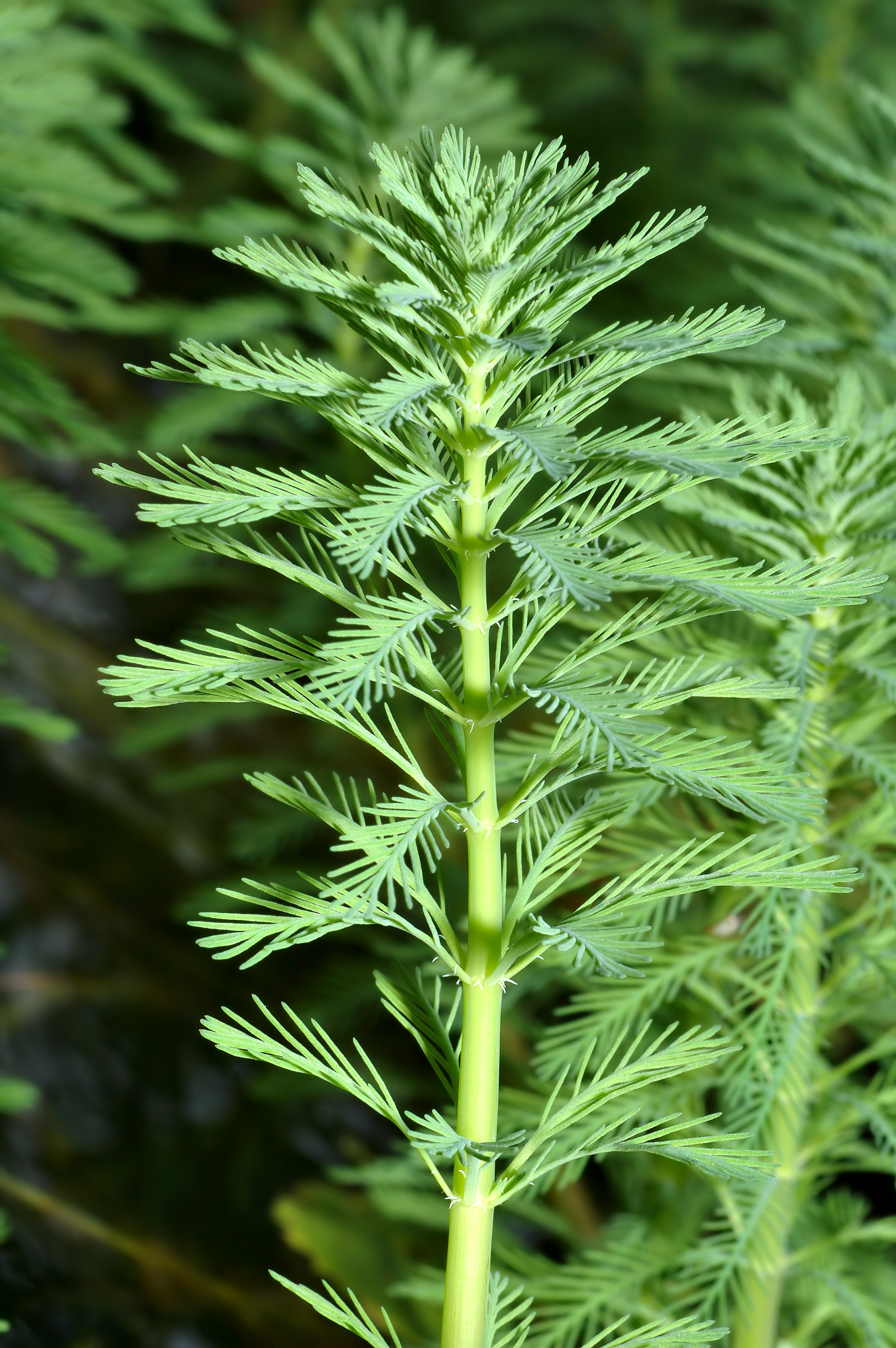

Scientific classification
- Kingdom: Plantae
- Clade: Tracheophytes
- Clade: Angiosperms
- Clade: Eudicots
- Order: Saxifragales
- Family: Haloragaceae
- Genus: Myriophyllum
- Species: M. aquaticum

Binomial name
- Myriophyllum aquaticum (Vell.) Verdc.

Synonyms
- List: Enydria aquatica Vell.; Myriophyllum brasiliense Cambess.; Myriophyllum proserpinacoides Gillies ex Hook. & Arn.

= Myriophyllum aquaticum =

Species of flowering plant

Myriophyllum aquaticum is a flowering plant, a vascular dicot, commonly called parrot's-feather and parrot feather watermilfoil.

== Morphology and reproduction ==
Parrot feather is a perennial plant named for its feather-like leaves which grow in whorls of four to six around the stem. Its emergent stems and leaves are its most distinctive features, as they can grow up to a foot above the water's surface, resembling small fir trees. The woody emergent stems can grow to over 5 feet / 1.5 m tall and will extend to the bank and shore. Pinkish-white flowers measuring approximately 1/16 inches long extend out from the plant.

As the water warms in the spring, the species begins to flourish. While most individuals flower in the spring, some also flower in autumn. Almost all plants of this species are female. No male plants have ever found outside of South America. Seeds are not produced by any North American plants. Parrot feather reproduces asexually. New plants grow from fragments of established plants that have already taken root. The plant has whorls of feathery, blue-green to waxy, grey-green leaves that are deeply cut into many narrow lobes.

Kasselmann recently described a new variety, M. aquaticum var. santacatarinense, which distinguishes itself from the typical variety by its more stiff and robust habitus and pinnae that are fewer and broader.

== Habitat ==
Parrot feather is native to the Amazon River in South America, but it can now be found on every continent except Antarctica. It is thought that this plant was introduced to North America around the late 1800s. It was first discovered in the United States in the 1890s in Washington, D.C. Parrot's feather typically grows in freshwater streams, ponds, lakes, rivers, and canals that have a high nutrient content. During the 20th century it colonised areas in South Africa, Japan, England, New Zealand, and Australia. As it prefers a warmer climate, it is chiefly found in the southern parts of the United States.

== Use and spread ==
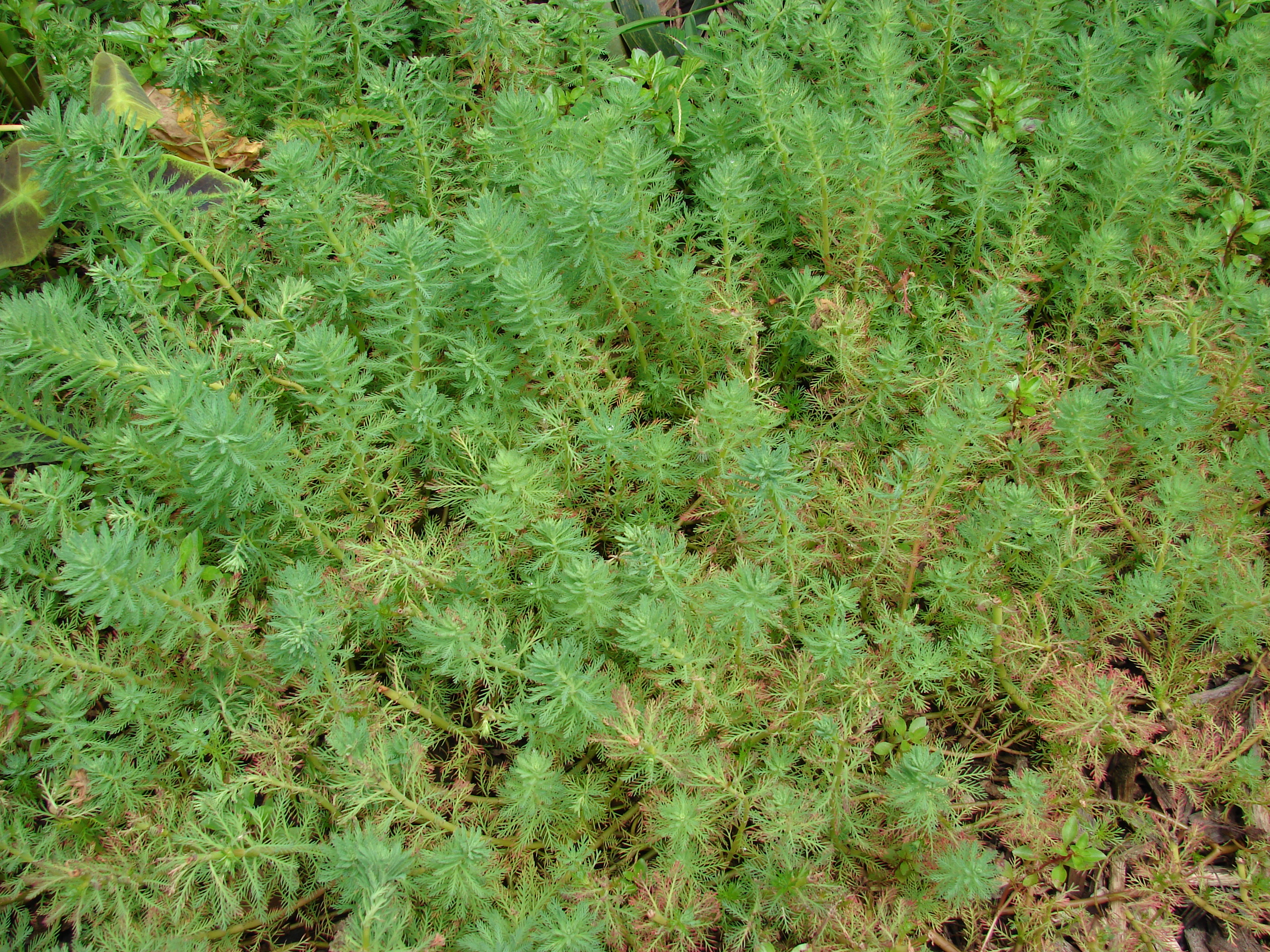

Parrot feather is now used in indoor and outdoor aquariums. It is a popular plant in aquatic gardens. It spreads easily and has become an invasive species and a noxious weed in many areas. The plant can be introduced to new areas when sections of its rhizome are dug up and moved. In Florida in the United States, flea beetles have been found to use parrot feather as a host for their larvae.

== Ecological impacts ==
Due to its aesthetic appeal and ease of cultivation, parrot feather has been introduced worldwide for use in both indoor and outdoor aquariums. It is also a popular choice for aquatic gardens, but has escaped cultivation and spread via plant fragments and intentional plantings. While it may provide cover for some aquatic fauna, it can significantly impact the physical and chemical characteristics of lakes and streams.

Parrot feather grows abundantly, shades out naturally occurring algae, and clogs irrigation ducts and canals. It typically grows in bundles extending out of the water. In large numbers, the plants form dense mats on the surface of the water, which shades it from sunlight. This causes native plants to die due to a lack of light. Organisms that feed on these native plants may also die of starvation. Moreover, the dense mats also cause problems for recreation. For example, swimmers and boat propellers can become entangled in the mats, which also provide a potential breeding ground for mosquitos.

== Clean-up efforts ==
The effectiveness of herbicides in controlling the growth of this species has been found to be limited, partly due to the plant's waxy cuticle, which acts as an effective barrier to the absorption of the poison. Cutting and chopping are also ineffective and can paradoxically facilitate the spread of the plant. In the U.S. states of Alabama, Connecticut, Massachusetts, Maine, Vermont, and Washington, parrot feather is a declared noxious weed and is therefore banned from sale.

The two main solutions for managing this aquatic nuisance plant are to physically remove the plant or to apply herbicides.

Physical removal methods include cutting, harvesting, and rotovation (underwater rototilling). These methods only produce the best results when the extent of the infestation has taken over all available niches. This is due to limited space compared to the rapid growth of the infestation. Using physical control methods in the early stages of plant infestation has been found to accelerate its rate of spread.

Another method of controlling parrot feather is to use herbicides, which are effective on plant parts exposed above water. Plant parts lying beneath the water never come fully into contact with the herbicides and are therefore washed away. Herbicides are most effective when applied to young growing plants and they should be applied repeatedly to achieve the best results.

M. aquaticum is more difficult to control with herbicides than other aquatic species. Their leaves are protected by a thick waxy coating, and in order for herbicides to penetrate them, surfactants must be added. However, herbicides may impact non-target native plants or animals.

In the United Kingdom, this plant is now classified as an invasive species and is one of five introduced aquatic plants that were banned from sale from April 2014. This is the first ban of its kind in the country.

In Europe, parrot feather has been included on the list of Invasive Alien Species of Union concern (the Union list) since 2016. This implies that this species cannot be imported, cultivated, transported, commercialised, planted, or intentionally released into the environment in the whole of the European Union.
