= Black River Academy =

- U.S. National Register of Historic Places
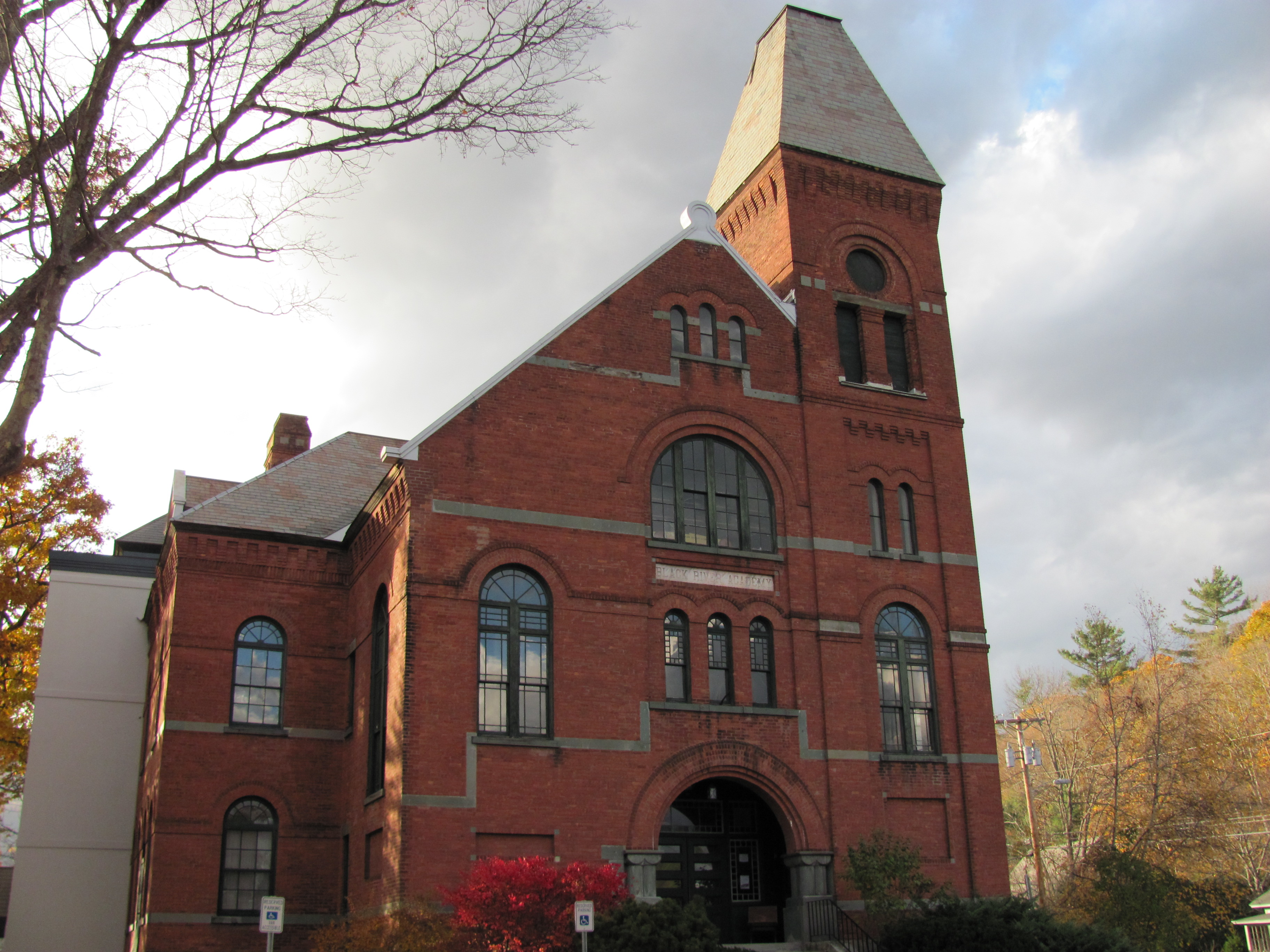

- Location within Vermont Location within the United States
- Location: 14 High St., Ludlow Village, Vermont
- Coordinates: 43°23′47″N 72°41′45″W
- Built: 1888
- Architect: Clinton Smith
- Architectural style: Romanesque, Richardsonian
- Website: Black River Academy Museum
- NRHP reference No.: 72000108
- Added to NRHP: November 15, 1972

The Black River Academy is a historic school building on High Street in the village of Ludlow, Vermont. Chartered in 1835, the school served as the town high school until 1938. The present building, a Richardsonian Romanesque structure built in 1888, was listed on the National Register of Historic Places in 1972 for its architectural and historic educational significance. It presently houses the Black River Academy Museum, operated by the Black River Historical Society.

== Description ==
The Black River Academy building stands on the south side of High Street, a short way west of the Ludlow village green. It is a three-story masonry structure, built out of load-bearing brick set on a granite foundation. It has a gabled roof with projection hip-roofed sections, and a four-story tower at one corner, topped by a truncated pyramidal roof. Windows are of a variety of sizes, but are generally set in round-arched openings. Bands of cut stone provide horizontal emphasis. The main entrance is in a deep recess under a round-arch opening. Roof lines of the main roof and tower feature corbelled brickwork at the eave.

== History ==
Black River Academy was chartered in Ludlow in 1835 and operated as a school, serving as the Town of Ludlow's public high school until 1938, when a new school was built. The original academy building burned early in the school's history, and the school operated in a church for 44 years until this building was built in 1888. Notable alumni of the Black River Academy include U.S. President Calvin Coolidge; Rotary founder Paul P. Harris; John Garibaldi Sargent, who was U.S. Attorney General during Coolidge's presidency; Vermont Governor William W. Stickney; United States Senator Ernest Willard Gibson; Vermont Supreme Court Justice William H. Walker; US Congressman from Missouri Henry M. Pollard; and author and historian Abby Maria Hemenway. After the school moved out, the building was used for a time as a convalescent home.

Since 1972, the building has housed the Black River Academy Museum, a museum of local history.

== See also ==
- Ludlow Graded School, located next door on the original 1835 academy site
- National Register of Historic Places listings in Windsor County, Vermont
