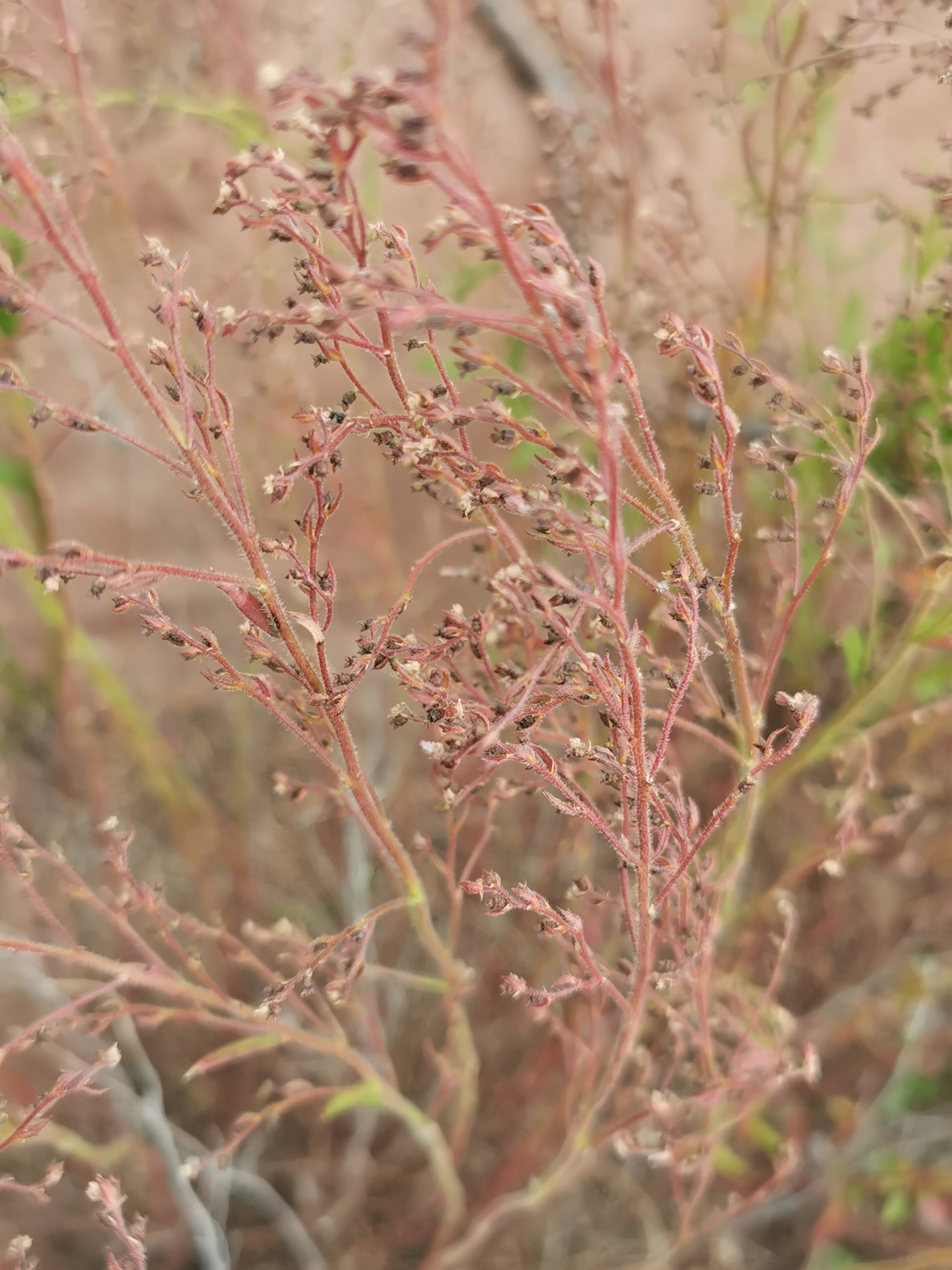

Scientific classification
- Kingdom: Plantae
- Clade: Tracheophytes
- Clade: Angiosperms
- Clade: Eudicots
- Order: Saxifragales
- Family: Haloragaceae
- Genus: Gonocarpus
- Species: G. elatus

Binomial name
- Gonocarpus elatus (A.Cunn. ex Fenzl) Orchard

= Gonocarpus elatus =

Species of flowering plant

Gonocarpus elatus (common name - hill raspwort) is a plant in the watermilfoil family Haloragaceae native to Australia, and found in New South Wales, Queensland, Victoria, and South Australia.

It was first described as Haloragis elata by Allan Cunningham in 1837, and was reassigned by Anthony Orchard to the genus, Gonocarpus in 1975.
