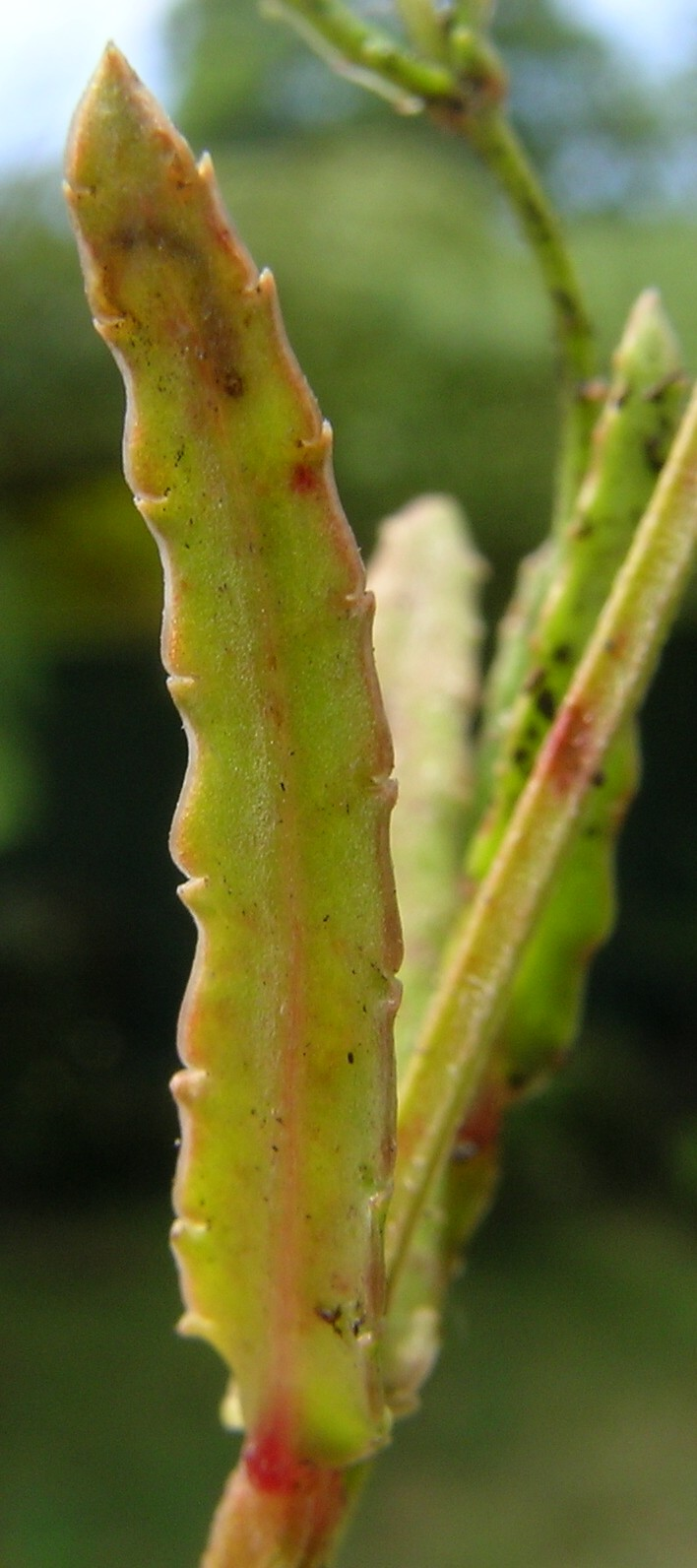

Scientific classification
- Kingdom: Plantae
- Clade: Embryophytes
- Clade: Tracheophytes
- Clade: Spermatophytes
- Clade: Angiosperms
- Clade: Eudicots
- Order: Saxifragales
- Family: Haloragaceae
- Genus: Gonocarpus
- Species: G. chinensis

Binomial name
- Gonocarpus chinensis (Lour.) Orchard

Synonyms
- Haloragis chinensis (Lour.) Merr.; Gaura chinensis Lour.

= Gonocarpus chinensis =

Species of flowering plant

Gonocarpus chinensis is a species of flowering plant in the family Haloragaceae. This shrub is sometimes known by the common name Chinese raspwort. It is native to Australia (Western Australia, Northern Territory, Queensland, New South Wales) Borneo, the Caroline Islands, South-Central and Southeast China, Hainan, Indonesia, the Lesser Sunda Islands, Malaysia, Nansei-shoto, New Guinea, the Philippines,Queensland, Sulawesi, Sumatera, and Vietnam. It was introduced to the Hawaiian islands and California. It is not considered an economically important species but can be used for medicine and gardening as ornamental plants. This species lives in wet tropical regions, grasslands, riverbanks and in waste lands in elevations at 100 to 800 meters but at 1800 meters in Southwest China.

This species has two known subspecies named Gonocarpus chinensis subsp. verrucosus and Gonocarpus chinensis subsp. chinensis.

== Description ==
This species can grow to be 60 cm tall. The stem of G. chinensis is weak.
