= Gonocarpus hirtus =

Conservation status
- Vulnerable (NCA)

Scientific classification
- Kingdom: Plantae
- Clade: Tracheophytes
- Clade: Angiosperms
- Clade: Eudicots
- Order: Saxifragales
- Family: Haloragaceae
- Genus: Gonocarpus
- Species: G. hirtus

Binomial name
- Gonocarpus hirtus Orchard

Species of flowering plant

Gonocarpus hirtus, is a species of flowering plant in the family Haloragaceae native to Australia.

== Description ==
It grows as a sub-shrub to a maximum height of 0.4 metres. The species has a perennial life cycle and is hermaphroditic.

== Distribution ==
The species occurs in wet forest and sclerophyll woodlands in the Northern Tablelands and Granite Belt regions of New South Wales and Queensland.

== Conservation ==
Under the Nature Conservation Act 1992 in Queensland, it has been classified as Vulnerable.
