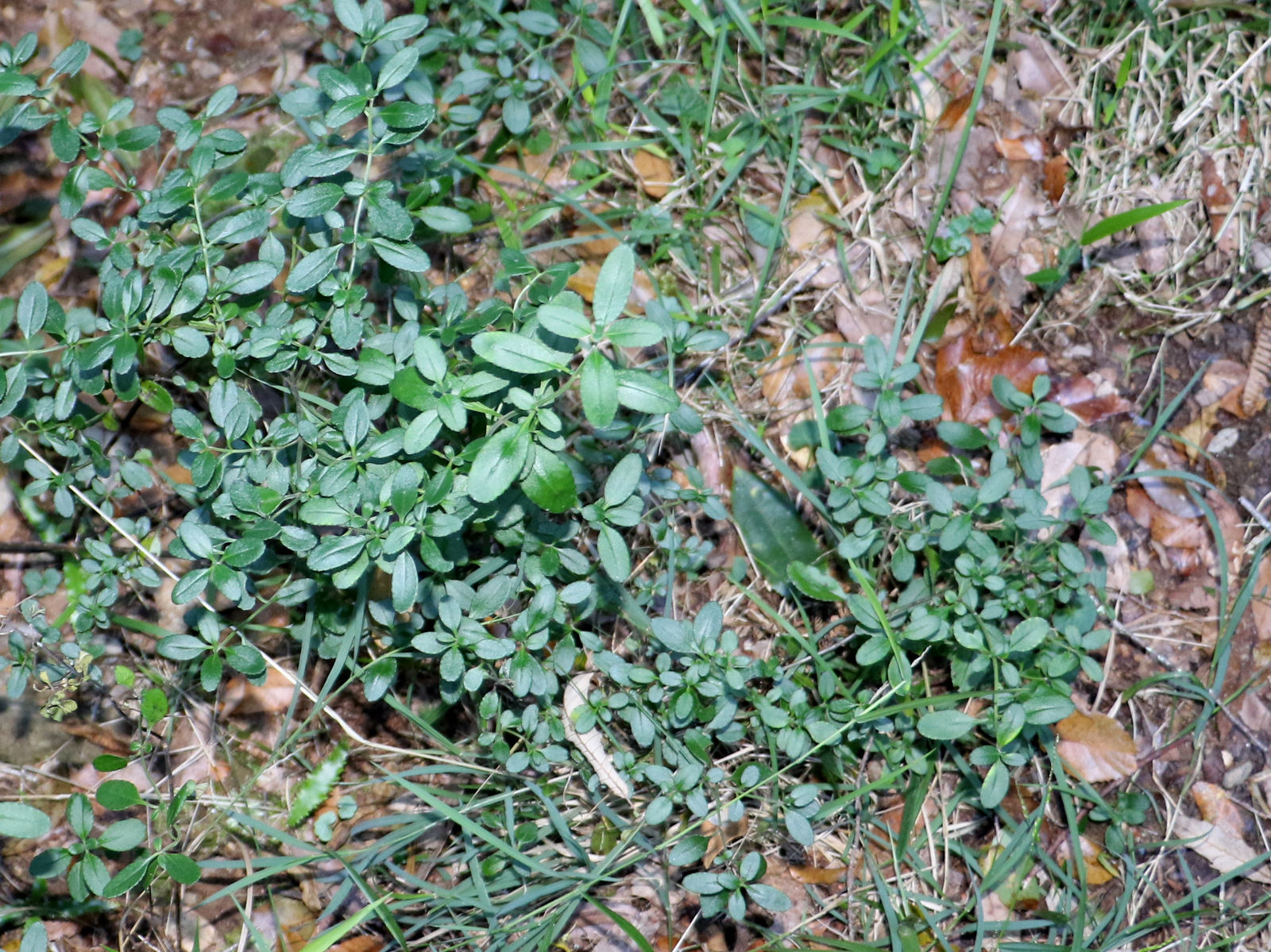
- at Mount Banda Banda, Australia

Scientific classification
- Kingdom: Plantae
- Clade: Tracheophytes
- Clade: Angiosperms
- Clade: Eudicots
- Order: Saxifragales
- Family: Haloragaceae
- Genus: Gonocarpus
- Species: G. oreophilus

Binomial name
- Gonocarpus oreophilus Orchard

= Gonocarpus oreophilus =

Species of flowering plant

Gonocarpus oreophilus is an Australian shrub in the watermilfoil family Haloragaceae. First collected for botanical science by C.T. White at the Mcpherson Range in 1915. The natural range of distribution is from the Barrington Tops region to south east Queensland, in moist forest country. The specific epithet (oreophilus) refers to the preference of a mountain habitat. Derived from the Ancient Greek words oros meaning "mountain" or "hill".
