= Gonocarpus effusus =

Conservation status
- Vulnerable (NCA)

Scientific classification
- Kingdom: Plantae
- Clade: Tracheophytes
- Clade: Angiosperms
- Clade: Eudicots
- Order: Saxifragales
- Family: Haloragaceae
- Genus: Gonocarpus
- Species: G. effusus

Binomial name
- Gonocarpus effusus Orchard

Species of flowering plant

Gonocarpus effusus, is a species of flowering plant in the family Haloragaceae that is endemic to Queensland in Australia.

== Description ==
It grows as a shrub to a maximum height of 5 metres. The species has a perennial life cycle and is hermaphroditic.

== Habitat & distribution ==
The species is endemic to South East Queensland with the main population residing in the Glass House Mountains. Occurrence records also confirm the existence of two other, smaller populations in Mount Coolum National Park and in D'Aguilar National Park. The species primarily inhabits wet forests.

== Conservation ==
Under the Nature Conservation Act 1992 in Queensland, it has been classified as Vulnerable.
