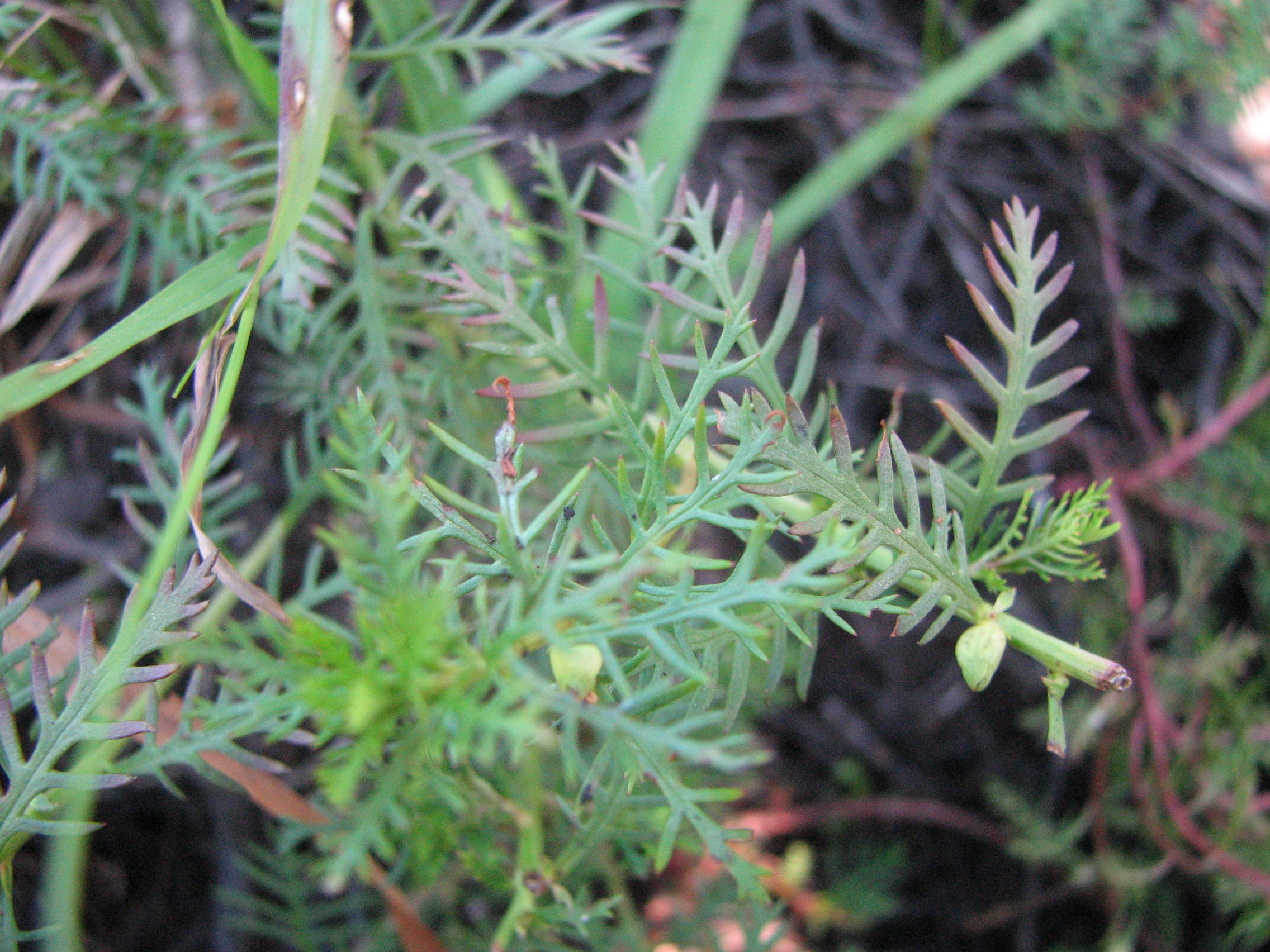
- Proserpinaca pectinata in the New Jersey Pine Barrens

Conservation status
- Secure (NatureServe)

Scientific classification
- Kingdom: Plantae
- Clade: Embryophytes
- Clade: Tracheophytes
- Clade: Spermatophytes
- Clade: Angiosperms
- Clade: Eudicots
- Order: Saxifragales
- Family: Haloragaceae
- Genus: Proserpinaca
- Species: P. pectinata

Binomial name
- Proserpinaca pectinata Lam.

Synonyms
- Myriophyllum fulvescens Bertol.; Proserpinaca palustris var. pectinata W.P.C.Barton

= Proserpinaca pectinata =

Species of aquatic flowering plant

Proserpinaca pectinata, commonly known as combleaf mermaidweed, comb-leaved mermaid-weed, or feathery mermaid-weed, is a species of aquatic or semiaquatic flowering plant in the family Haloragaceae. It is native to eastern North America and Cuba.

== Taxonomy ==
Proserpinaca pectinata was first described by Jean-Baptiste Lamarck in 1792. Its specific epithet, pectinata, is derived from Latin pectinatus, meaning comb-shaped or pectinate.

In 1910, Kenneth Kent Mackenzie described Proserpinaca intermedia from material collected in the New Jersey Pine Barrens. Mackenzie distinguished it from P. palustris and P. pectinata by its intermediate leaf morphology: P. palustris has serrate or serrulate emergent leaves and pectinate submerged leaves, P. pectinata has leaves divided to the rachis, and P. intermedia was described as having pectinate emergent leaves with a broader rachis.

The status of P. intermedia has been interpreted differently by later floristic treatments. Go Botany treats it as Proserpinaca × intermedia, a rare hybrid of P. palustris and P. pectinata known from Massachusetts and Rhode Island, and distinguishes it by pinnately lobed submerged leaves, a broader central rachis than in P. pectinata, and fruit size. The Digital Atlas of the Virginia Flora excludes the taxon from formal recognition in Virginia, noting that records attributed to P. intermedia have been interpreted as a hybrid, a species of hybrid origin, or environmentally induced plasticity, and that empirical evidence for hybrid origin is lacking.

== Description ==
Proserpinaca pectinata is a perennial wetland herb of aquatic and semiaquatic habitats. Stems are trailing to decumbent at the base and may become ascending toward the tips, reaching up to 50 cm (20 in) in length.

The leaves are alternate, simple, and deeply divided into narrow, comb-like segments rather than being divided into separate leaflets. Leaf blades are mostly 13–23 mm (0.51–0.91 in) long, and the final leaf segments are 2–7.5 mm (0.079–0.295 in) long. Unlike many aquatic plants with strongly different submerged and emergent foliage, the leaves of P. pectinata remain similar along the stem; both submerged and emergent leaves are deeply pinnately divided and feather-like.

The flowers are small, radially symmetrical, and borne without stalks in the axils of emergent leaves. They have an inferior ovary, three sepals, three stamens, and three carpels. The fruit is a small, dry, indehiscent, three-loculed nutlet or schizocarp, 2–2.8 mm (0.079–0.110 in) long.

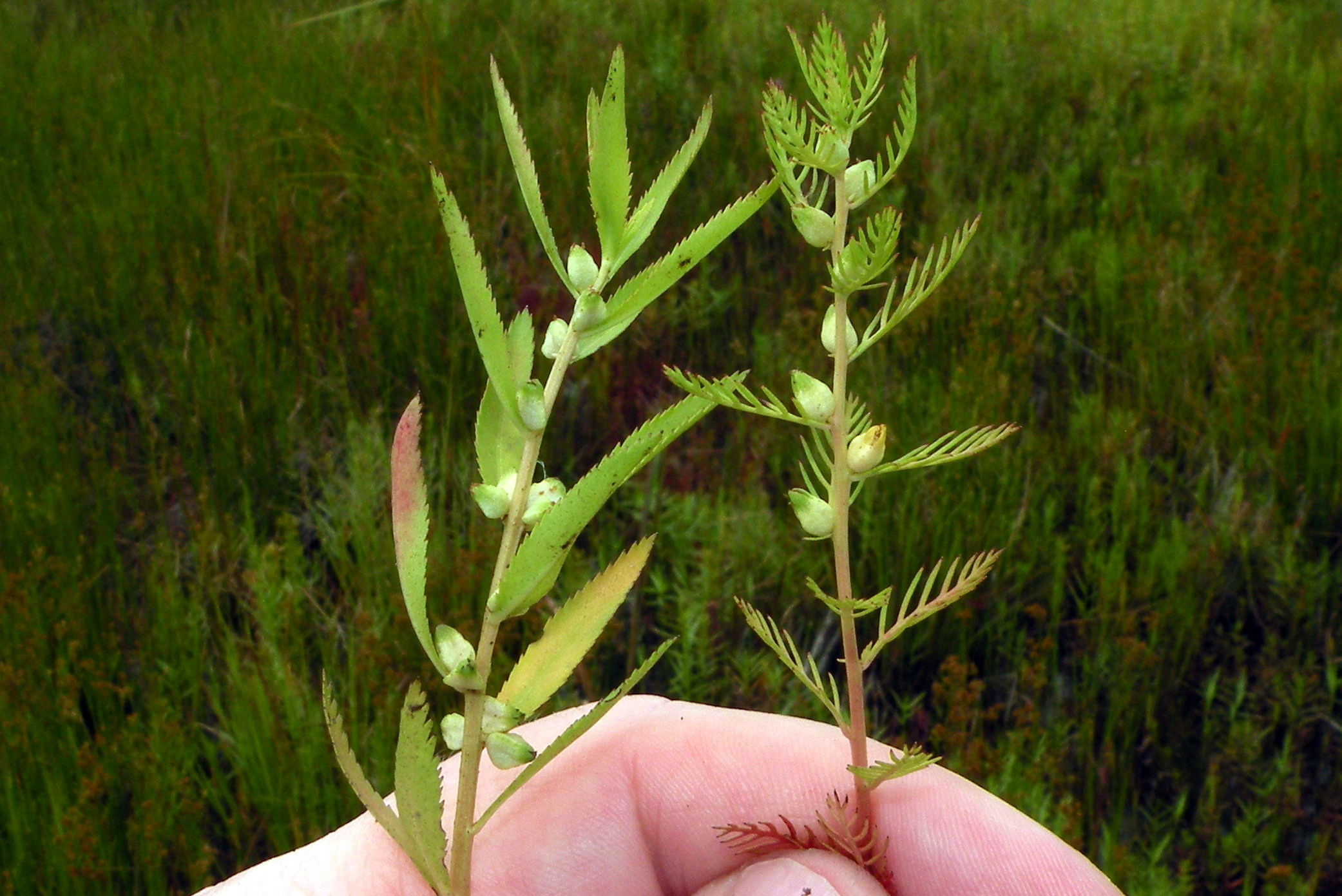
Proserpinaca palustris and P. pectinata in Hopkinton, Rhode Island

Proserpinaca pectinata can be distinguished from the more common Proserpinaca palustris by its pinnately lobed or pinnately divided floral bracts, shorter leaf blades, and lower leaves with mostly six to nine pairs of segments. In P. palustris, the flowers are subtended by toothed bracts, the leaf blades are usually longer, and the lower leaves usually have seven to fourteen pairs of segments. Also contrasting P. palustris, both submerged and emergent leaves are similar in form and remain pectinate. The species may also resemble aquatic milfoils such as Myriophyllum aquaticum, but mermaidweed has one alternate leaf per node, while parrotfeather has leaves arranged in whorls.

=== Phenology ===
Flowering and fruiting occur mainly from summer into early autumn. The Flora of the Southeastern United States gives the phenology as June to October, while the Maine Natural Areas Program reports flowering and fruiting from July through September.

== Distribution and habitat ==
Proserpinaca pectinata is native to eastern North America, southeastern Mexico, and Cuba. In North America, it is primarily a species of the Atlantic and Gulf Coastal Plains, ranging from Newfoundland and Nova Scotia south to Florida and west to eastern Texas. Scattered inland populations occur in habitats similar to coastal-plain pond shores, including pond margins, pools, and ditches.

The species grows primarily in freshwater aquatic and semiaquatic wetlands. Reported habitats include stream margins, wet peaty depressions, bogs, marshes, savannas, swamps, and seasonally inundated ditches. In much of its range, it is strongly associated with sandy coastal-plains wetland habitat. In Michigan, where the species is disjunct from its main range, it is known from a single sandy, wet, peaty ditch that is seasonally inundated.

== Conservation ==
NatureServe currently ranks Proserpinaca pectinata as G5 (globally secure). The species is nevertheless rare or legally protected in parts of the northern edge of its range, including Michigan, where it is ranked S1 and listed as endangered. Michigan's only known occurrence was first collected in Ottawa County in 1941, initially identified as P. palustris, redetermined as P. pectinata by E. G. Voss in 1983, and rediscovered by A. A. Reznicek in 1984. In New York, it is listed as a threatened native plant under 6 NYCRR § 193.3.
