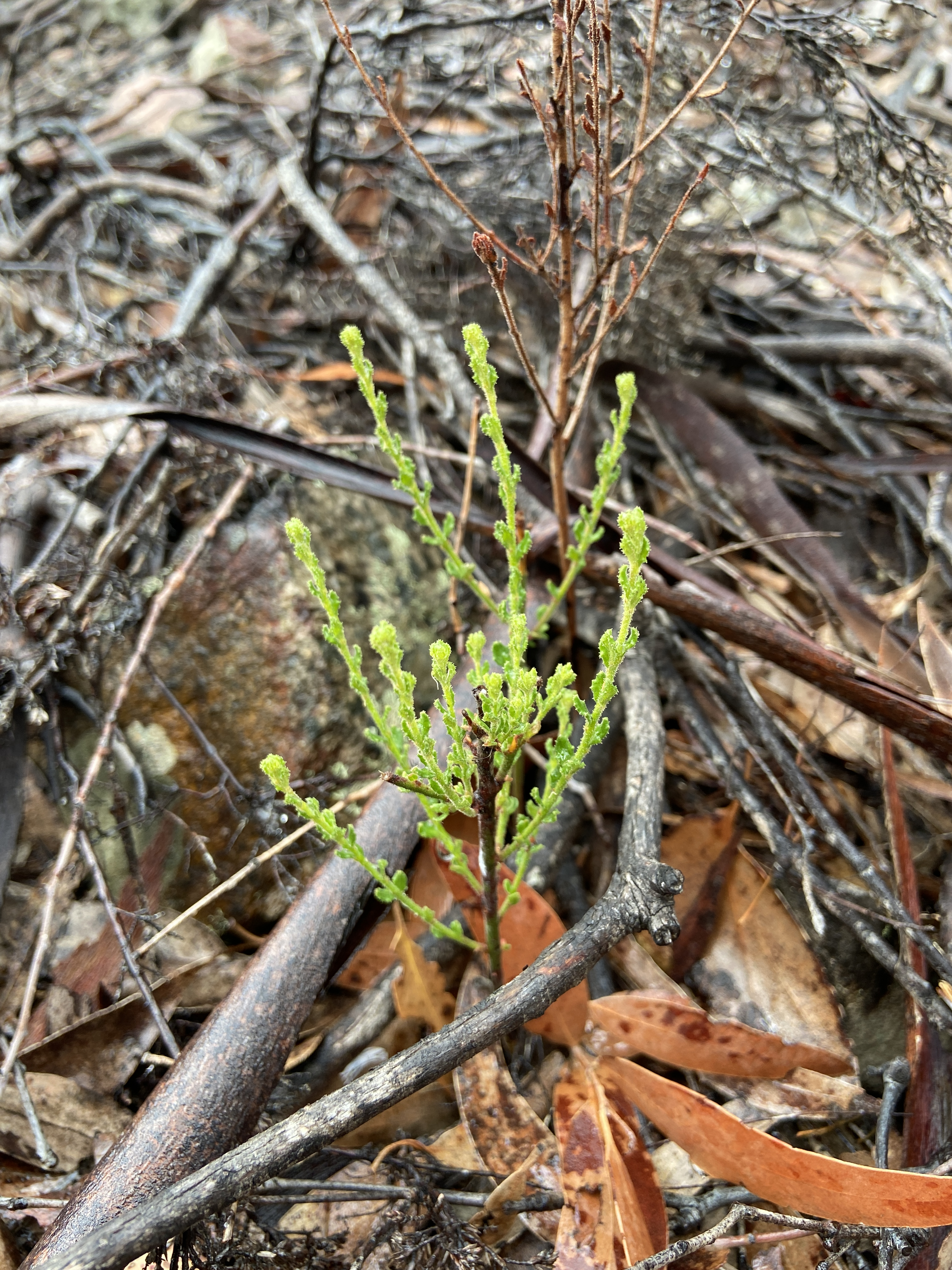

Scientific classification
- Kingdom: Plantae
- Clade: Tracheophytes
- Clade: Angiosperms
- Clade: Eudicots
- Order: Saxifragales
- Family: Haloragaceae
- Genus: Gonocarpus
- Species: G. teucrioides

Binomial name
- Gonocarpus teucrioides DC.

Synonyms
- Haloragis aenea Schindl. Haloragis gunnii Hook.f. Haloragis teucrioides (DC.) Schltdl. Haloragis teucrioides var. elata Sond. Haloragis teucrioides var. lanceolata Sond.

= Gonocarpus teucrioides =

Species of plant

Gonocarpus teucrioides, or forest raspwort is a common flowering herb or subshrub in the Haloragaceae, or watermilfoil family. It is native to Queensland, New South Wales, Victoria and Tasmania and is widespread and abundant in the understorey of wet forests. The name raspwort refers to the rough, scabrous surface of many of the Gonocarpus species.

The specific epithet, teucrioides, derives from Teucrium and the Greek suffix -oides which indicates resemblance, thereby giving an adjective meaning that the species resembles the plants in the genus, Teucrium.

== Habit ==
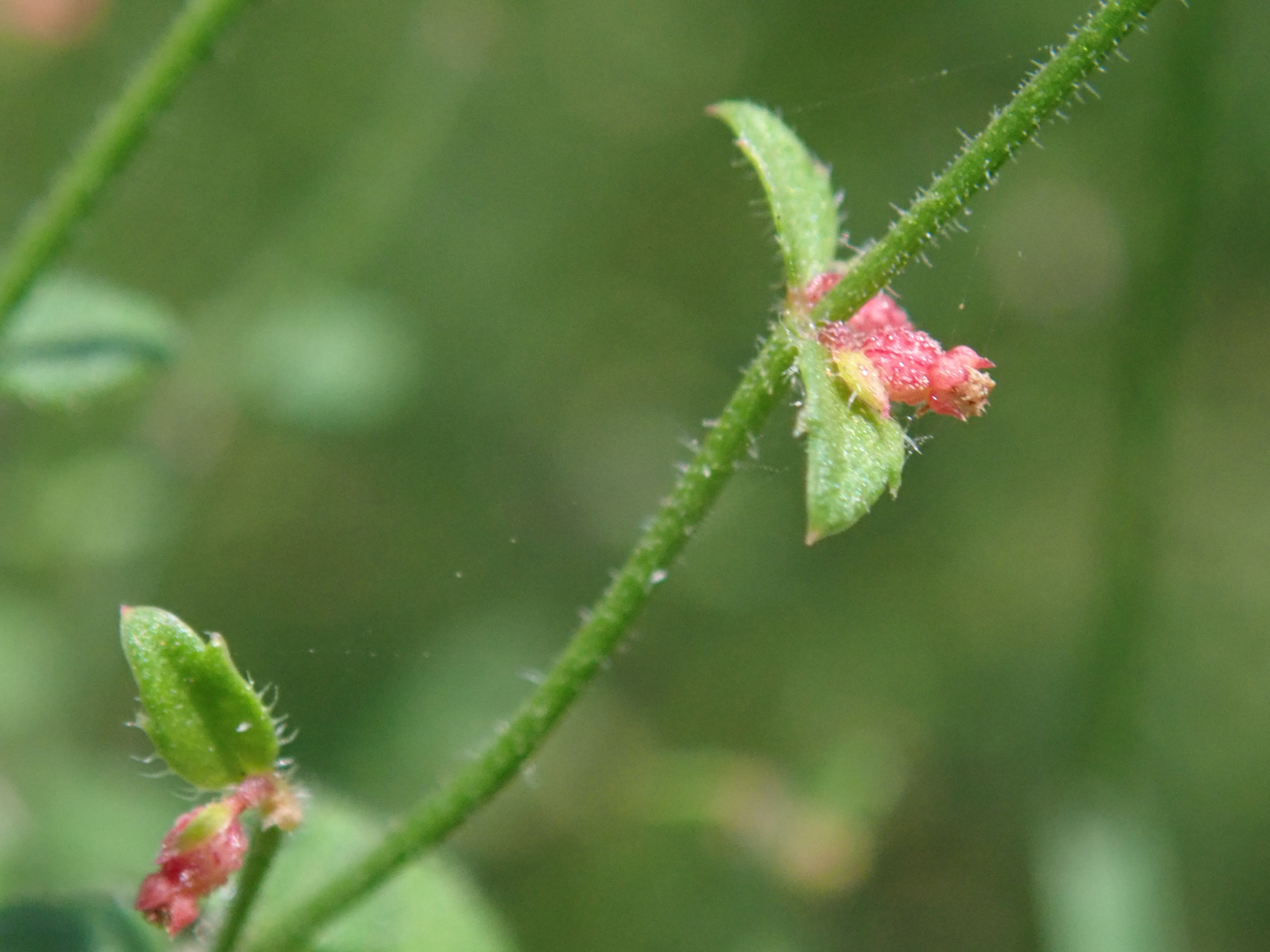
G. teucrioides in flower

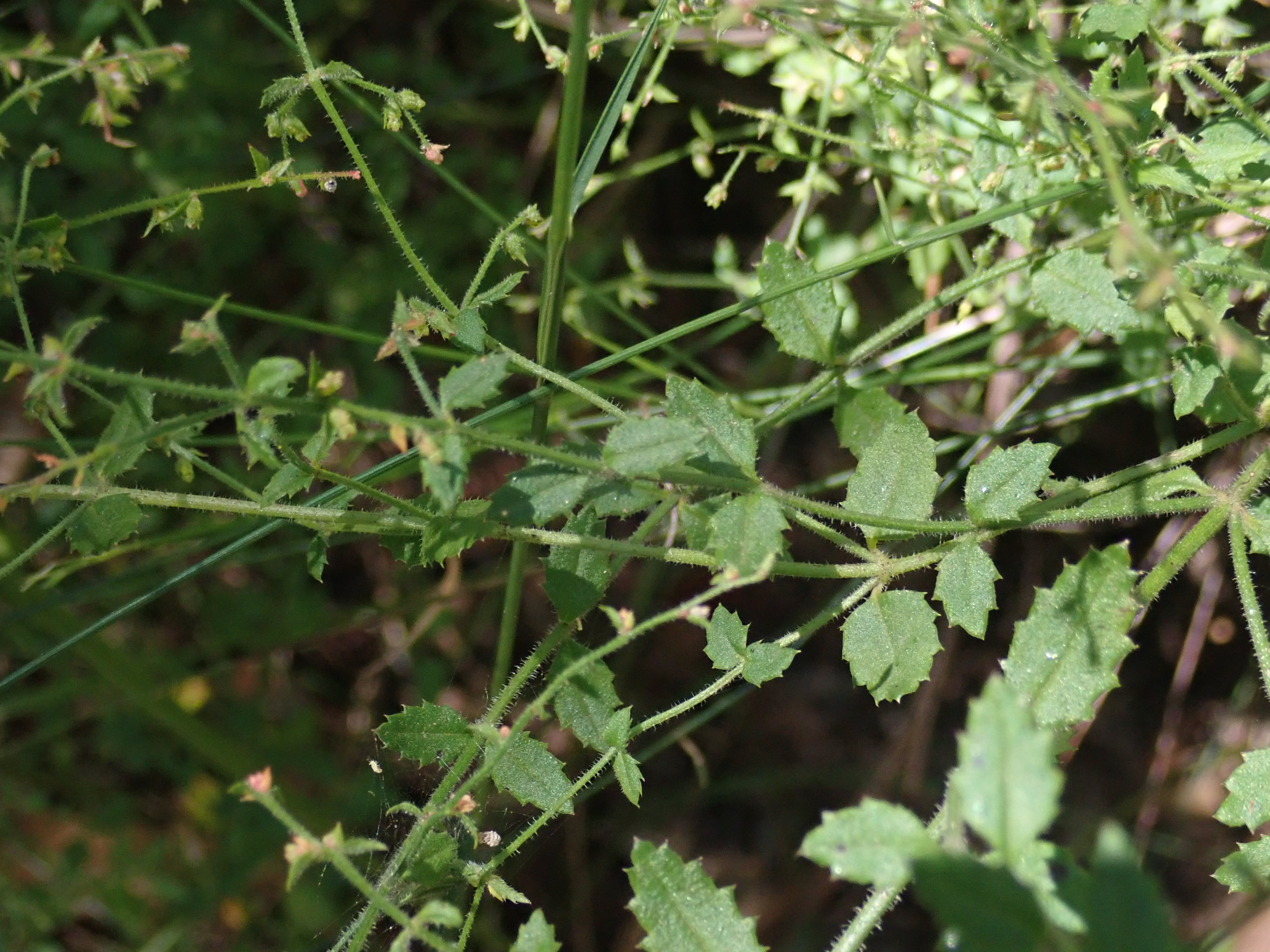
G. teucrioides leaves/habit

It is an erect perennial herb, woody at the base, 30–40 cm tall and 20–30 cm wide. Its stems are 4-angled in cross section. Leaves are opposite and ovate, with toothed margins and 7–22 mm long. They have a dark green upper surface and a lighter undersurface, stems are often reddish. Both the leaves and stems have stiff, spreading hairs. Flowers are small and solitary, occurring in pairs of bracts in the leaf axils along the lower section of the flowering stem. They are carried in racemes at the end of the stem. Bracts are green and fleshy, petals are green to reddish. Plants are monoecious, and flowering occurs from October to January. Fruit is an ovoid, silver-grey ribbed nut, about 1.5 mm long.

== Habitat ==
Native to Queensland, New South Wales, Victoria and Tasmania, Gonocarpus teucrioides prefers moist, well-drained soils in semi-shade. It is thus common in the understorey of open or partially open forests and vegetation types, especially those subjected to enhanced runoff or higher rainfall.
