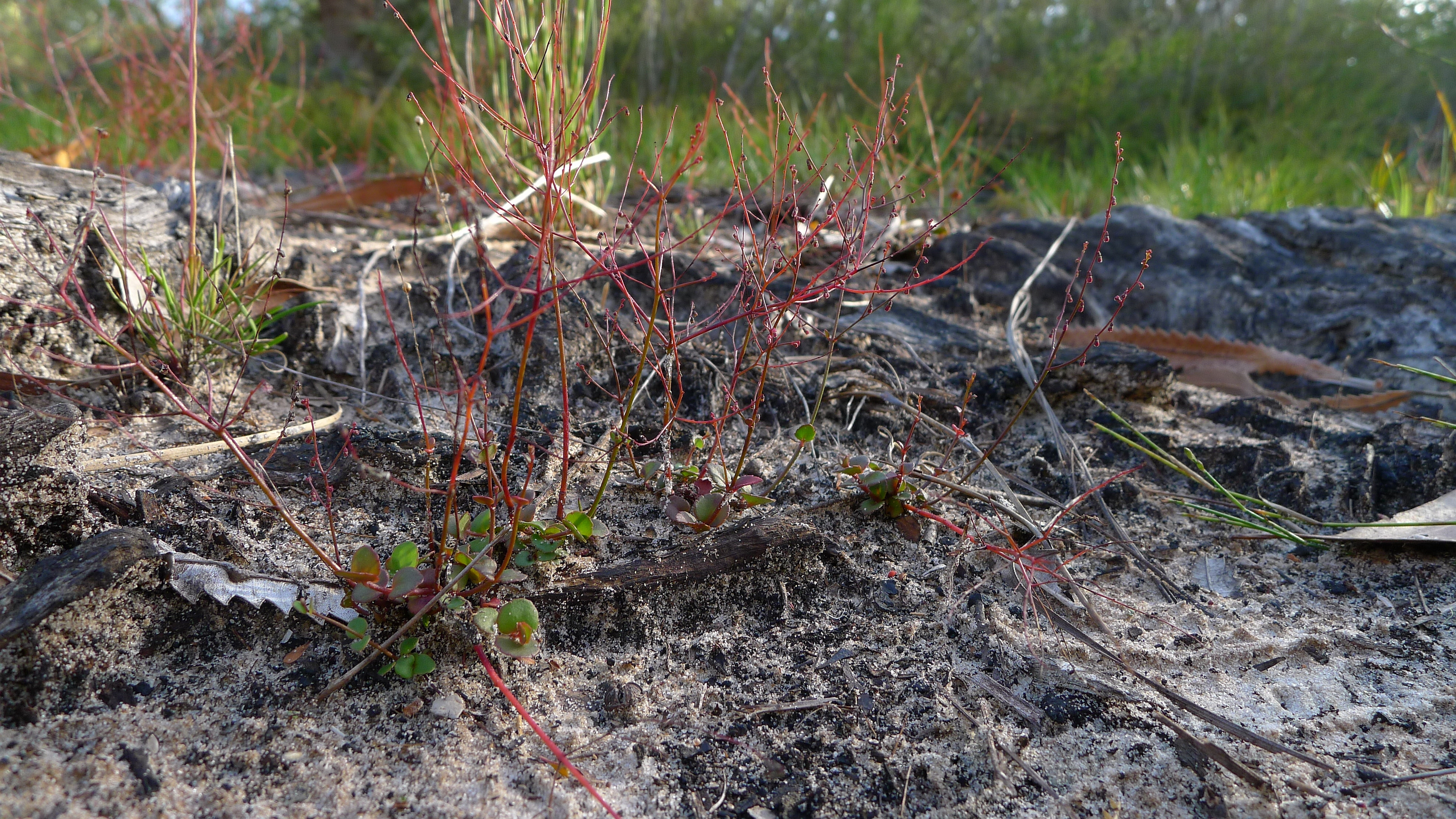

Scientific classification
- Kingdom: Plantae
- Clade: Tracheophytes
- Clade: Angiosperms
- Clade: Eudicots
- Order: Saxifragales
- Family: Haloragaceae
- Genus: Gonocarpus
- Species: G. micranthus

Binomial name
- Gonocarpus micranthus Thunb.

Subspecies
- subsp. micranthus subsp. ramosissimus

Synonyms
- Haloragis micrantha (Thunb.) R.Br. ex Sieb. & Zucc.

= Gonocarpus micranthus =

Species of flowering plant

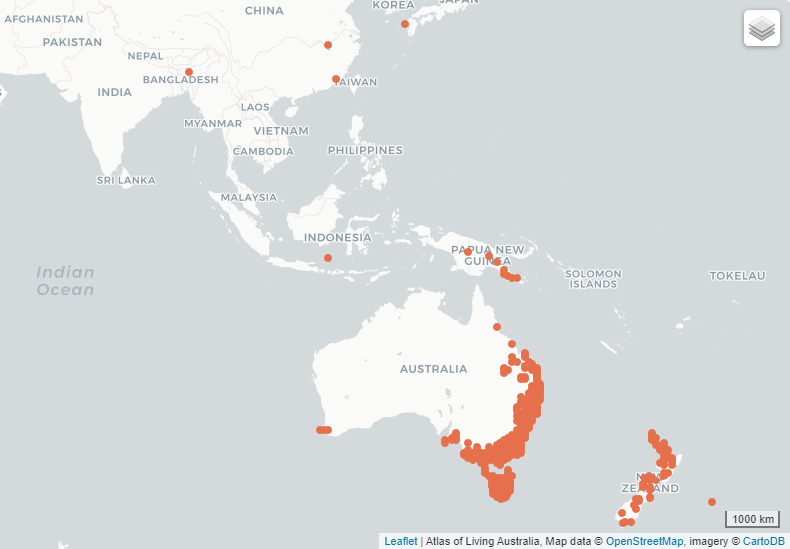
Gonocarpus micranthus species occurrence, from ALA.

Gonocarpus micranthus commonly called creeping raspwort is a prostrate, ascending or erect perennial herb in the family Haloragaceae. It is native to Australia, New Zealand, New Guinea, South-east Asia, Japan and the Himalaya.

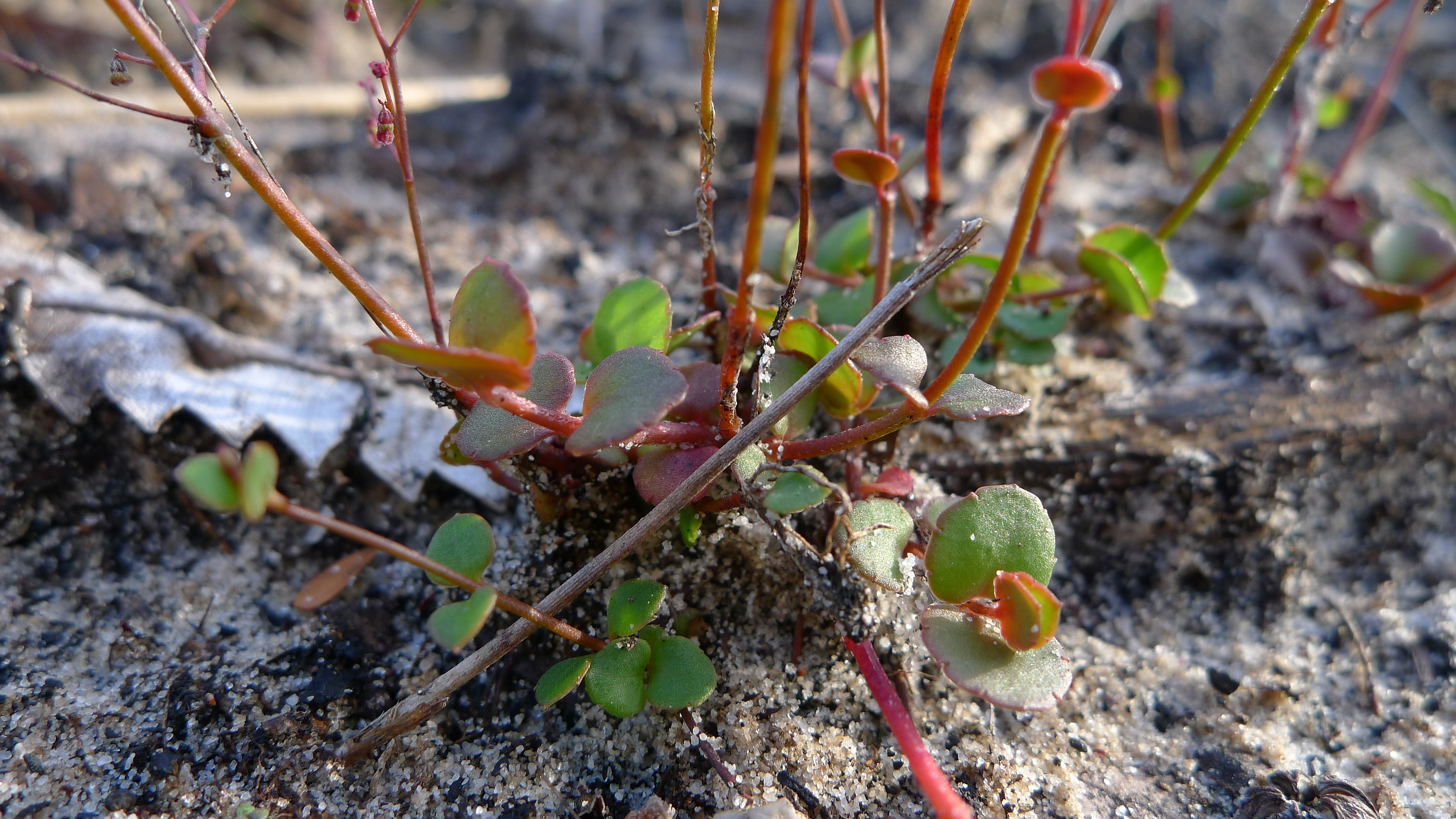
Gonocarpus micranthus

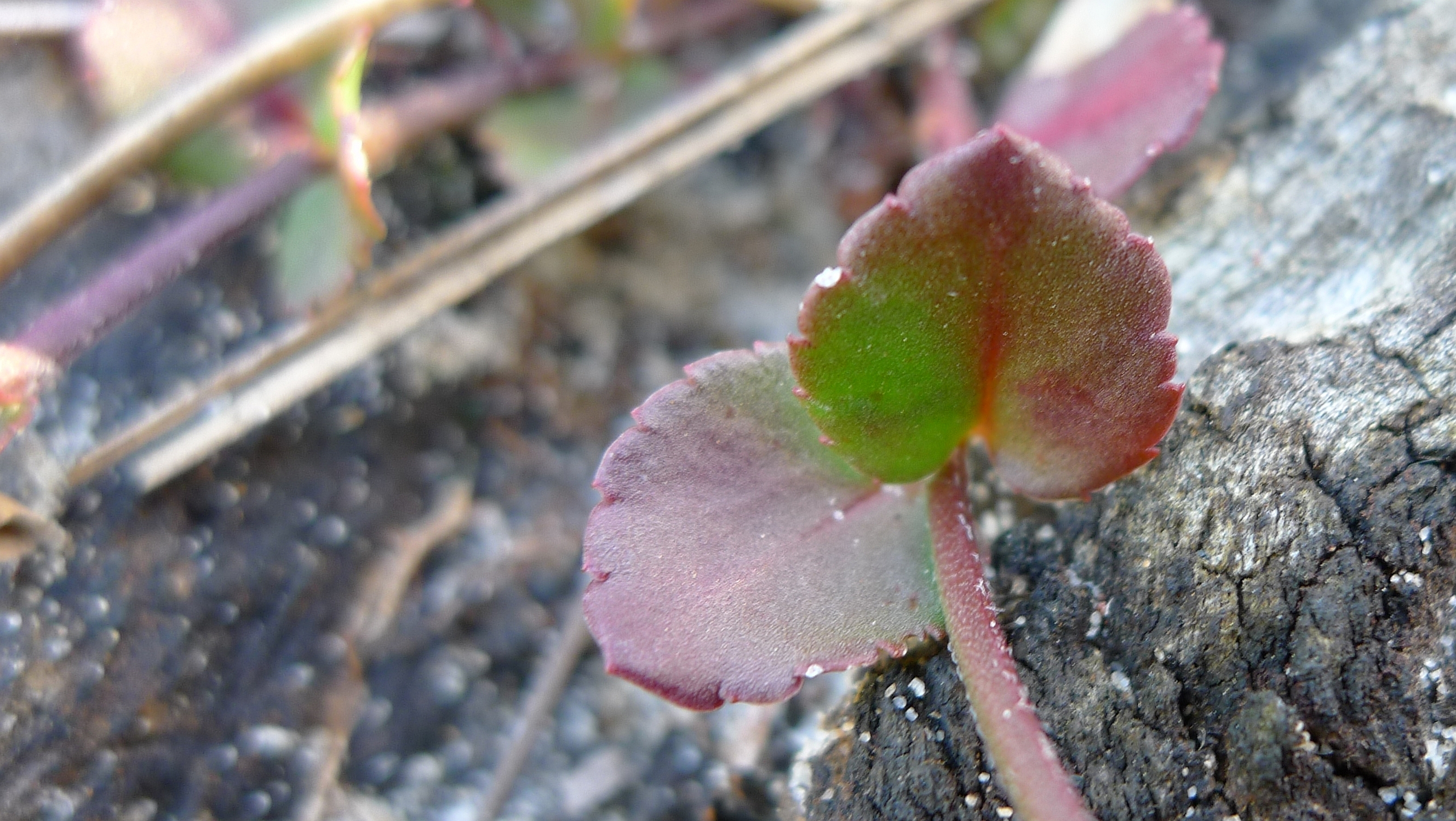
Gonocarpus micranthus leaf detail

== Description ==
Gonocarpus micranthus is a prostrate, ascending or erect much branched herb 5-60cm tall. Stems root at the nodes, are smooth, glabrous or rarely with few scattered hairs, or sparsely scabrous. The leaves are opposite and decussate, orbicular to ovate in shape, rounded or cordate at the base, glabrous, very variable in size, 3–15mm long, 3-11mm wide, and the margins are thickened with 8-20 small crenate teeth. The petiole is very short, 0.6-2mm in length. Bracts are alternate, lanceolate, 0.5-1mm long, entire, and deciduous. Bracteoles are orbicular, 0.1-0.2mm long, entire or minutely serrate, brown and deciduous. The inflorescence is typically unbranched or branched only to the second order. Flowers are pendent on a short pedicel 0.1-0.3mm long, with reddish petals 0.8-1.5mm long. The fruit is obovoid, up to 1mm long, smooth with 8 ribs and reddish to grey in colour.

Two subspecies differing in their structure and distribution are recognised.

Gonocarpus micranthus subsp. micranthus is prostrate to ascending, usually less than 20cm high. Its inflorescences are narrow and unbranched or branching to the second order and ascending. The leaves are predominantly less than 8mm. This subspecies is widespread across its distribution.

Gonocarpus micranthus subsp. ramosissimus is erect, between 25-60cm in height. Its inflorescences are diffuse, spreading to the third or fourth order with the final inflorescence branches almost horizontal. The leaves are mostly longer than 8mm. This subspecies is more restricted in its distribution.

== Habitat and distribution ==
Gonocarpus micranthus occurs across Australia from the Fleurieu Peninsula in S.A. through Victoria, Tasmania, New South Wales and Queensland. It is also found in New Zealand, New Guinea, Southeast Asia, Japan and the Himalayas. The subspecies ramosissimus is restricted to coastal regions of east coast states of Australia with a number of specimens also identified in Southwest Western Australia.

It is restricted from alpine to subalpine in the northern part of its range, descending to sea level in more southern regions. Occurs in heath and wet swampy areas extending into open eucalypt forest on damp sandy soils. In Tasmania it grows on wet peat soils from sea level to the alpine.

== Etymology ==
Gonocarpus is derived from the Greek ‘gonia’ meaning angle or corner, and ‘carpos’ meaning fruit. This alludes to the ribbed nature of the fruit.

G micranthus is also derived from Greek ‘micros’ meaning small and ‘anthos’ meaning flower, referring to the tiny flowers.

The common name raspwort refers to the rough texture and wort derived from old English ‘wyrt’ meaning plant or herb.

== Bibliography ==
- Orchard, A. E. (1979). "Myriophyllum (Haloragaceae) in Australasia. I. New Zealand: A Revision of the Genus and a Synopsis of the Family". Brunonia. 2: 247–287. CiteSeerX 10.1.1.492.3964. doi:10.1071/bru9850173.
