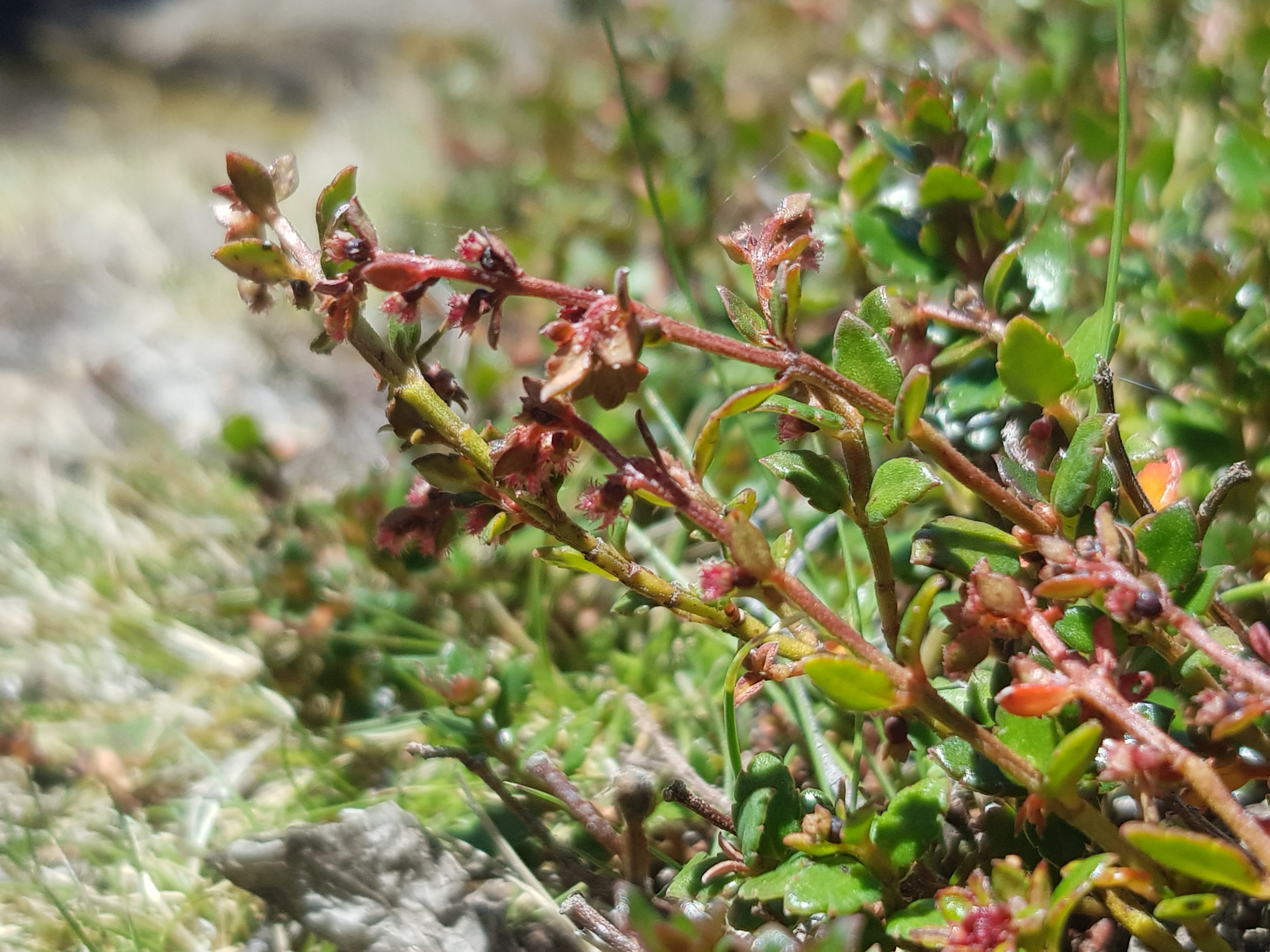

Scientific classification
- Kingdom: Plantae
- Clade: Tracheophytes
- Clade: Angiosperms
- Clade: Eudicots
- Order: Saxifragales
- Family: Haloragaceae
- Genus: Gonocarpus
- Species: G. montanus

Binomial name
- Gonocarpus montanus (Hook.f.) Orchard

= Gonocarpus montanus =

Species of flowering plant

Gonocarpus montanus is a perennial, terrestrial herb in the family Haloragacae. It is native to N.S.W, Victoria, Tasmania and New Zealand. Common names include mountain raspwort and mat raspwort. Its synonym is Haloragis montana.

== Description ==
Gonocarpus montanus, from the family Haoragacae, is a small (10–15 cm) perennial herb which grows both upright and procumbent. The stem has short appressed hairs running in lines along internodes. Young stems may appear square in cross section.

=== Leaves ===
The leaves are arranged opposite on the stem. They are shaped ovate to broad lanceolate, about 3.5-10mm long, and 2-6mm wide. They have thick margins with 4-6 teeth. The leaves are coriaceous and can be glabrous, or sparsely pilose on the base. They are attached to the stem by a petiole, 1-3mm long.

=== Flowers ===
Flowers occur from November to February.

Floral bracts are present at the base of each flower and bracts lower on the stem are opposite, becoming alternate up the stem. These bracts are lanceolate in shape, 2-4mm long, with smaller (0.8-1.5mm) lanceolate bracteoles (a leaf-like structure between a bract and flower) present that are red/brown with entire margins.

The flowers are red and small in Tasmania but range from grey to violet/purple in New Zealand. They are supported by a pedicel, 0.2-0.5mm long. They have 4 sepals 0.9-1mm long with thick margins, 4 petals 1.5-1.8mm long, 4 stamens that attach opposite the sepals, and 4 staminodes 0.5mm long, opposite the petals. The anthers, part of the stamen where pollen is produced, are 0.8-1.2mm long.

The ovary is ovoid in shape, 1-1.5mm long, and can be a silver-grey to reddish purple colour. It is glabrous and 8 ribbed, often with 2 oblique calluses between ribs.

=== Fruit ===
The fruit is 1.5–1.6 mm long, silver-grey and is 1 seeded.

Photos of Gonocarpus montanus specimens at 1160m asl. on kunanyi / Mt. Wellington, Tasmania, 18th February 2024

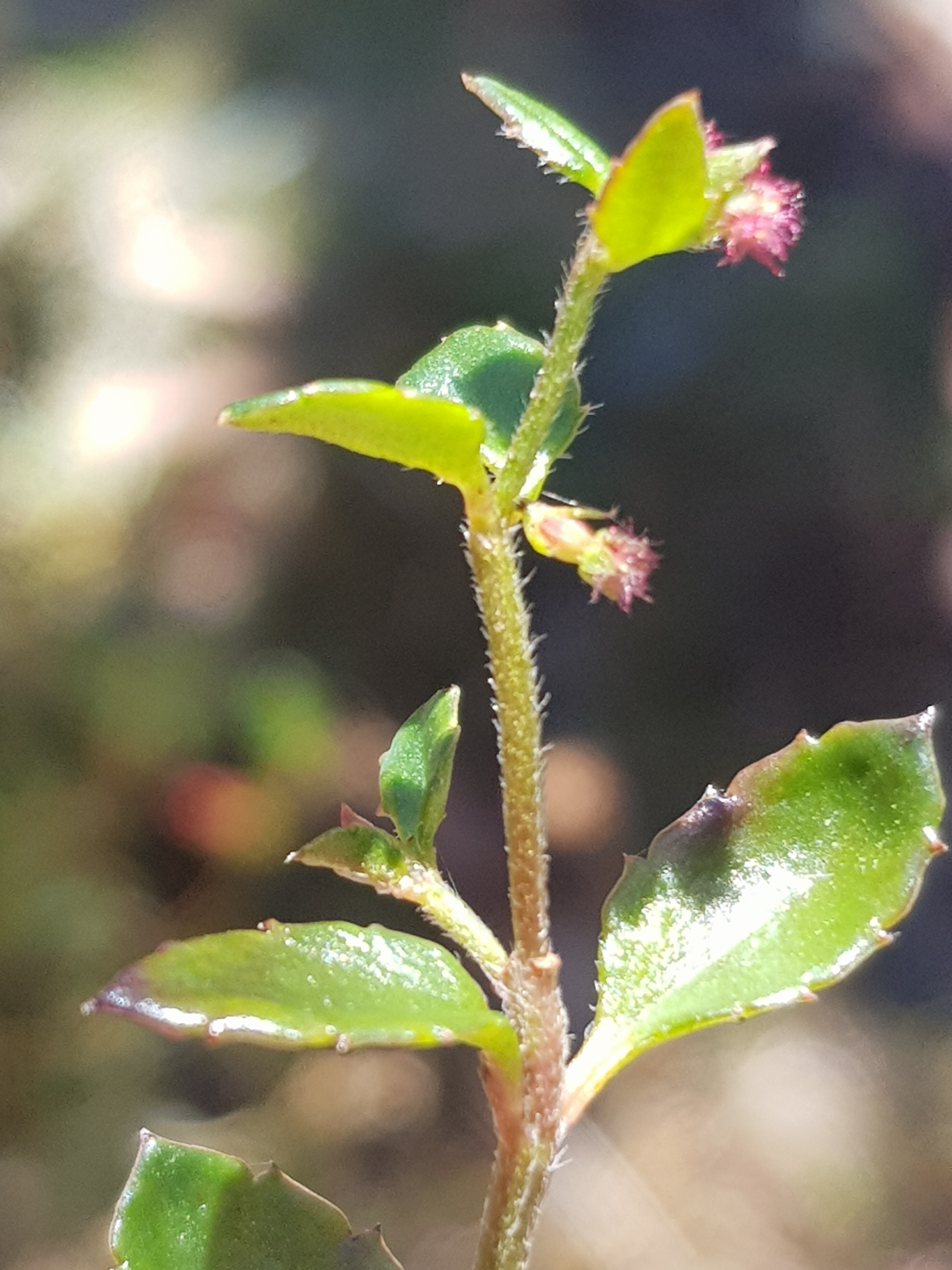
Photo part 1/2. Hairs in lines along second highest internode evident. Toothed margins of leaves can be seen.

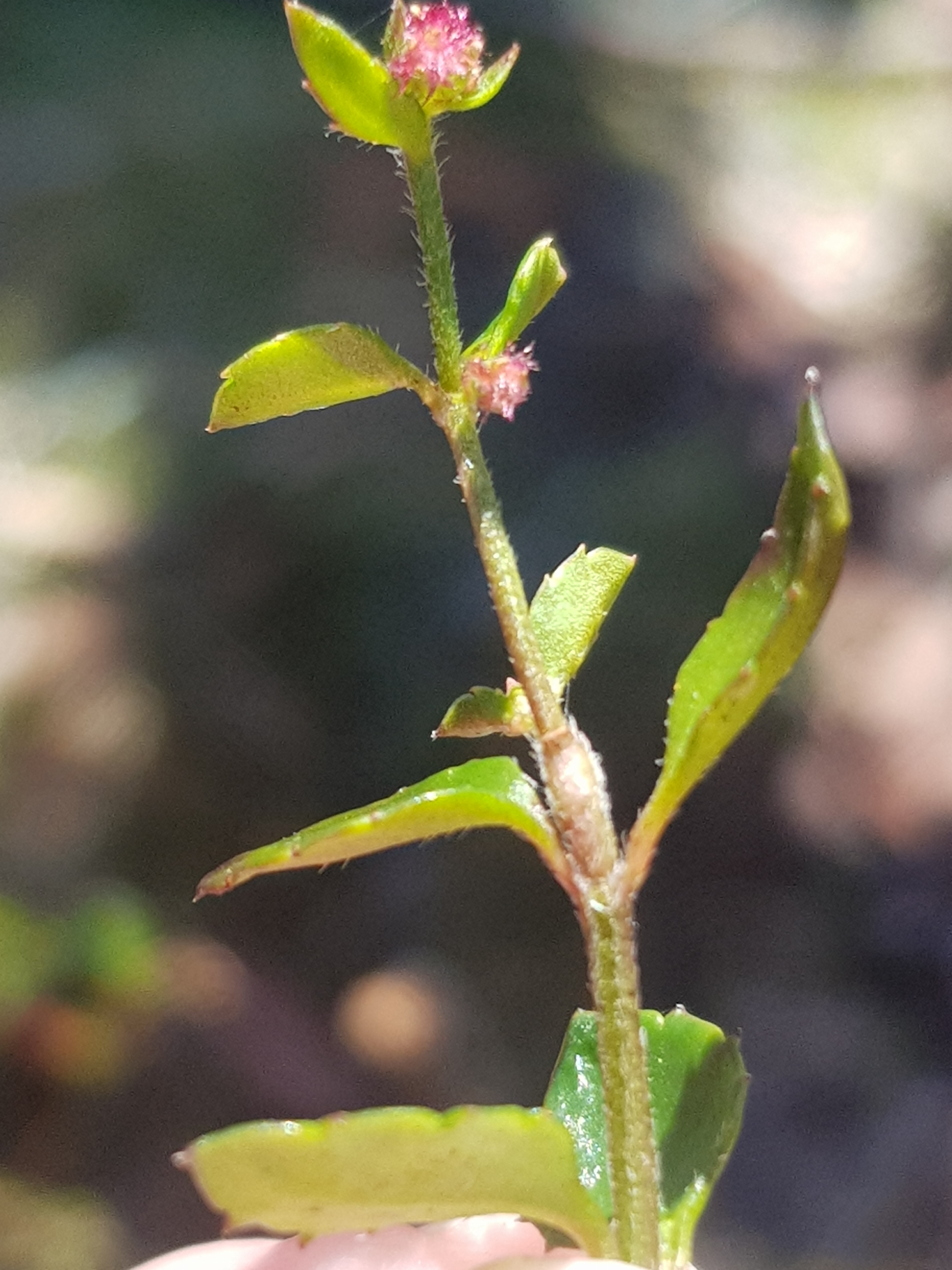
Photo part 2/2. As it's rotated the hairs along second highest internode "disappear", evidence the hairs run in lines.

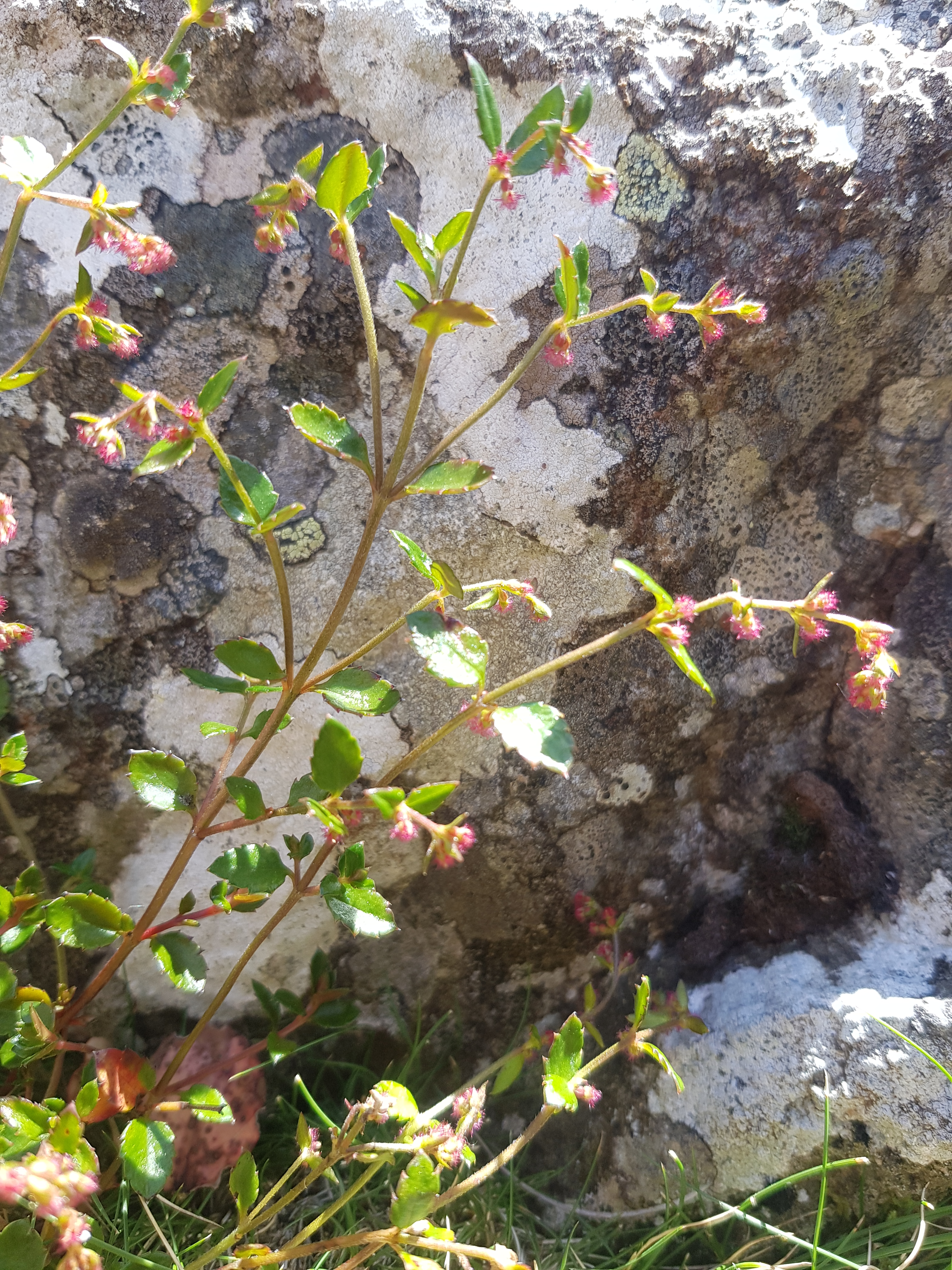
Growing in upright form and in flower.

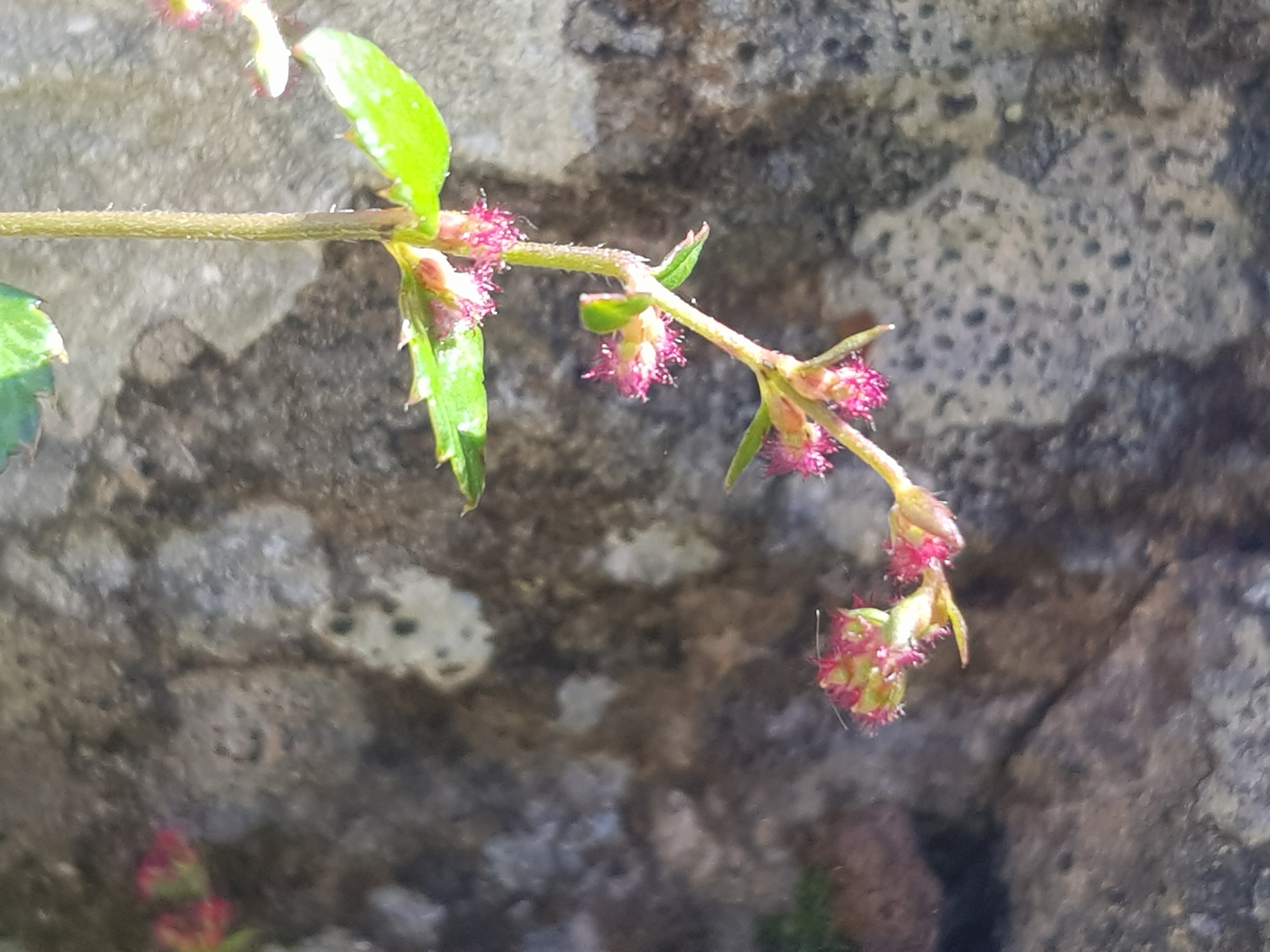
Flowers are bright pink on this specimen.

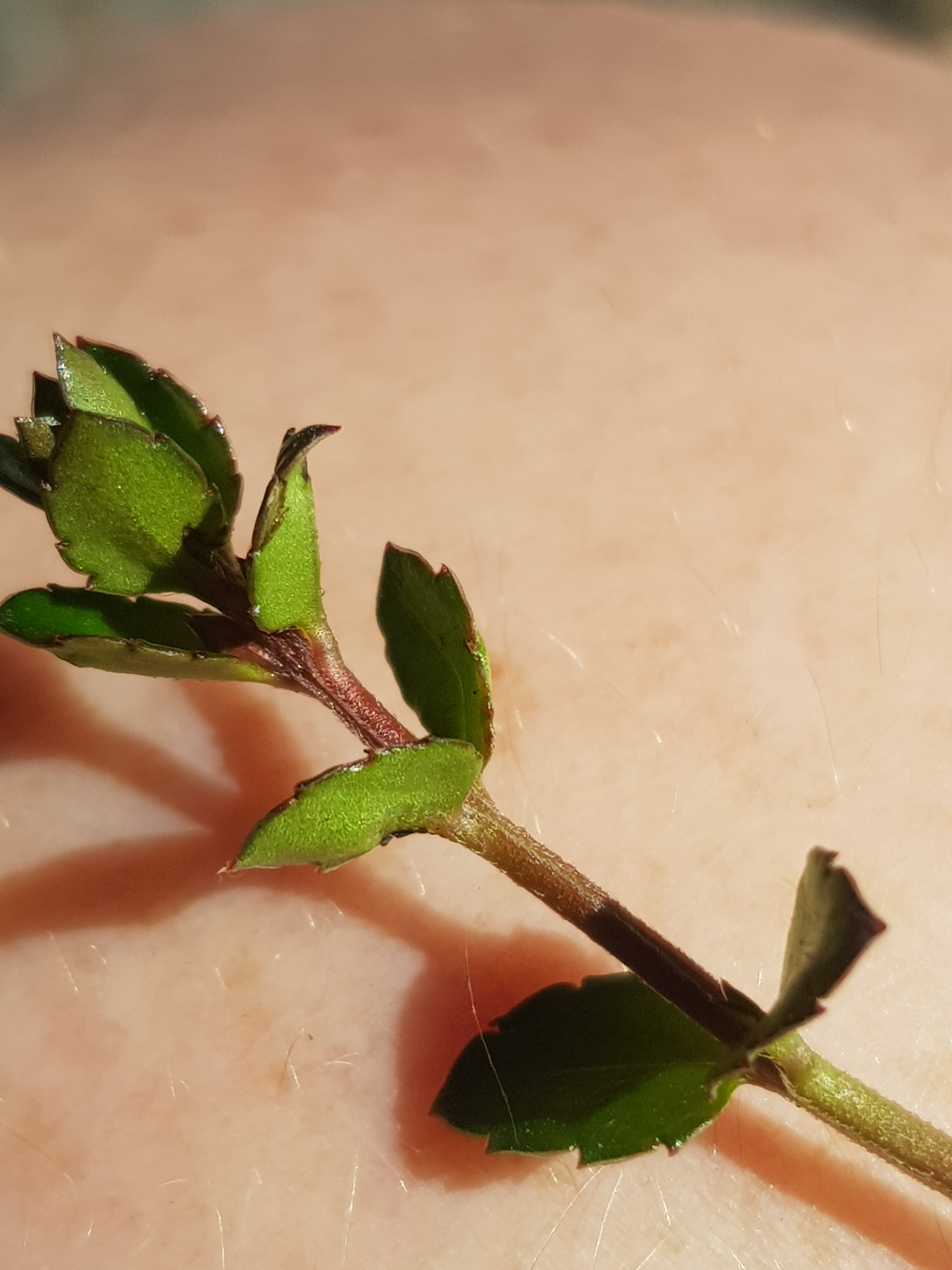
Opposite leaf arrangement is evident.

== Similar species ==
Table 1: Comparing similar species to Gonocarpus montanus.
Similar species (name).	Difference compared to Gonocarpus montanus.
Gonocarpus serpyllifolius	Smaller, thinner leaves with less robust habit. The flowers decussate in the lower part of the inflorescence only, fruit is more dull. Stems round in cross section and hairs are not in lines along the internode.
Gonocarpus teucrioides	Leaves and stems in spreading hairs (not appressed).
Gonocarpus humilis, Gonocarpus tetragynus, and Gonocarpus micranthus.	All bracts are alternate.

== Habitat and distribution ==
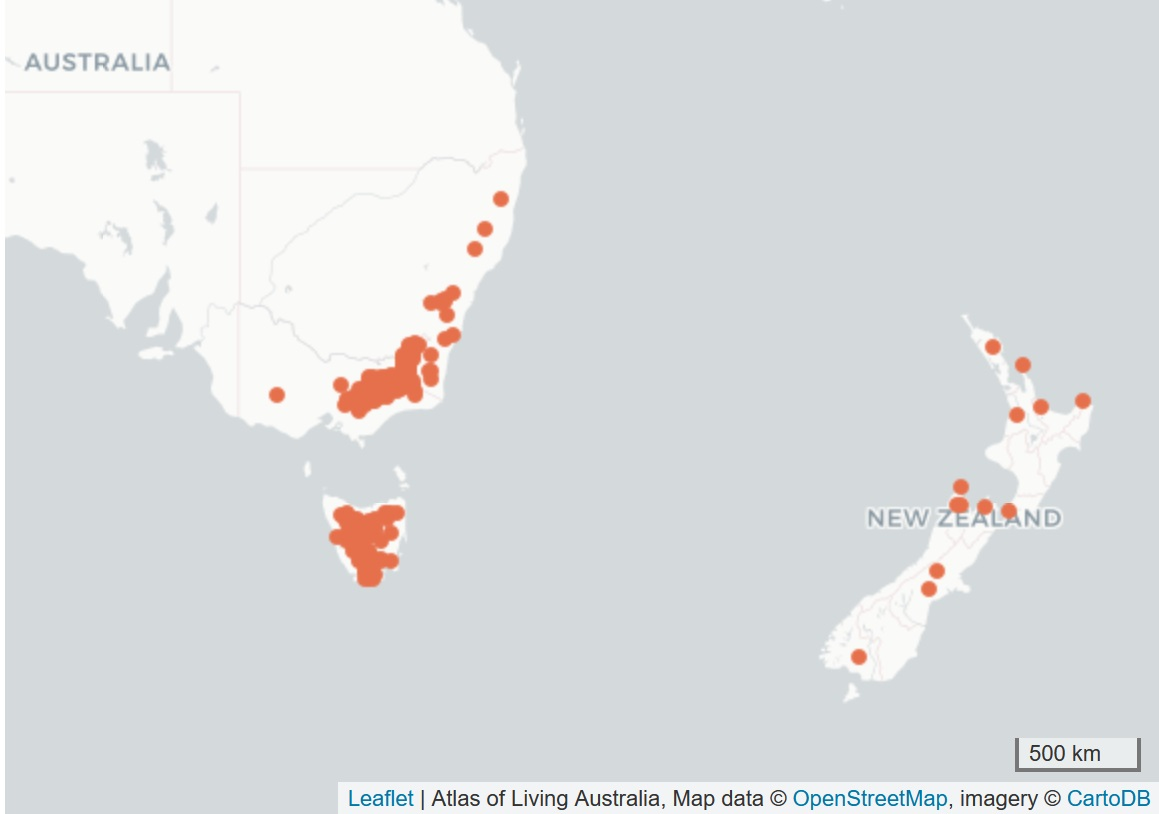
Species occurrence map of Gonocarpus montanus, from ALA.

Gonocarpus montanus occurs in the subalpine and alpine areas of NSW, Victoria, Tasmania and New Zealand. There is an exception in Victoria with an occurrence noted in the Grampians.

It is widespread and quite common in the subalpine to alpine, in a variety of habitats and vegetation communities. In Australia, it has been found in feldmark vegetation (Tasmania), layered eastern moor vegetation (Tasmania), wet sub alpine forests (Victoria), and in alpine heaths including in Kosciuszko National Park (NSW). In New Zealand, it has been found in Leptospermum scoparium forest, and tussock grasslands.

Table 2: Vegetation types and location of some Gonocarpus montanus occurrences in Tasmania.
Vegetation type	Location	Description
Feldmark vegetation	The Boomerang	On mountain in the south of Tasmania, on transects within 250m of the summit (1081m asl)
Layered Eastern Moor community	King William Creek	On the central Plateau in a sub community of Eastern Moorland community (770-780m asl).
Alpine heath, alpine moorland, Eucalyptus woodland, mountain rainorest, subalspine moorland	Lake Dobson	Found in lake sediments of Lake Dobson (1034m asl).

== Ecology ==
Recorded interactions with the abiotic and biotic environment include:

- Non-native deer (Cervus unicolor) in Bogong High Plains Victoria, show a preference to consume Gonocarpus montanus, especially in February and March.
- Gonocarpus montanus reproductive structures were preserved, leaves did not, in surface sediments in Lake Dobson catchment area in Mt Field national Park, Tasmania.
- Increasing peat depth was correlated with an increase in abundance of Gonocarpus montanus in a study at King William Creek, Tasmania.
- Aspect may affect distribution, as in feldmark vegetation at The Boomerang, Gonocarpus montanus was absent from the easterly and westerly aspects, but present in the northerly and southerly aspects.
- At King William Creek, it was generally overtopped in the Layered Eastern Moor community by the dominant graminoids (Lepidosperma filiforme, Lepyrodia tasmanica, Paa tenera, Empodisma minus, Diplarrena latifolia, Restio australis and Astelia alpina).

== Dispersal ==
In New Zealand it is thought the fruit is wind dispersed.

== Etymology ==
Gonocarpus derived from Greek 'gonia' meaning angle or corner and 'carpos' meaning fruit. This describes its ribbed fruits.

'Montanus' is latin for mountainous.

== Uses ==
A small plant for moist gardens and rockeries at higher altitudes. Can be used as a ground cover in pots with other erect plants, likes to be moist.
