= Gonocarpus humilis =

Scientific classification
- Kingdom: Plantae
- Clade: Tracheophytes
- Clade: Angiosperms
- Clade: Eudicots
- Order: Saxifragales
- Family: Haloragaceae
- Genus: Gonocarpus
- Species: G. humilis

Binomial name
- Gonocarpus humilis Orchard

Species of flowering plants

Gonocarpus humilis, commonly known as shade raspwort, is a small herb in the genus Gonocarpus of the family Haloragaceae. Shade raspwort is common along the eastern coast of Australia, and grows in moist and shaded locations. The leaves have a rough and scabrous surface, giving the plant the common name raspwort.

== Description ==
G. humilis is a variable monoecious perennial herb, reaching up to 50cm tall. It ranges from erect to prostrate or semiprostrate, with stems up to 70cm. Stems are ribbed, hairy or rough, with spreading hairs that are warty at the base. Flowers are yellow-green, with four hooded petals and stamens, each 0.8–1.5 mm (0.031–0.059 in) long. Leaves are opposite and decussate with toothed margins 10–20 mm (0.39–0.79 in) long, 5–12 mm (0.20–0.47 in) wide and shortly petiolate with a scabrous surface. The fruit is a silver-grey to purplish nut, oval in shape and 1–1.5 mm (0.039–0.059 in) long. It has eight ribs with two to three hard protrusions between them.

== Distribution ==
G. humilis is widespread along the eastern coast of Australia, and occurs in Queensland, New South Wales, Victoria, South Australia and Tasmania. It also occurs on Kangaroo Island.

== Habitat ==
This species is commonly found in moist or boggy patches in shady locations. Its habitat is variable depending on location, but it is primarily found in coastal regions in most states, except for Tasmania and Victoria, where it occurs from the coast through to inland regions.

== Distinguishing from similar species ==
Commonly mistaken for G. tetragynus, it can be distinguished by inflorescence: the flowers are alternate and sparse, and bracts are smaller and distinctly different from the leaves. Its habit is lax rather than erect. It has four stamens instead of eight and lacks white, appressed hairs. Site moisture can also be an indicator: G. tetragynus prefers dryer conditions.

== Cultivation ==
This species is rarely cultivated.
