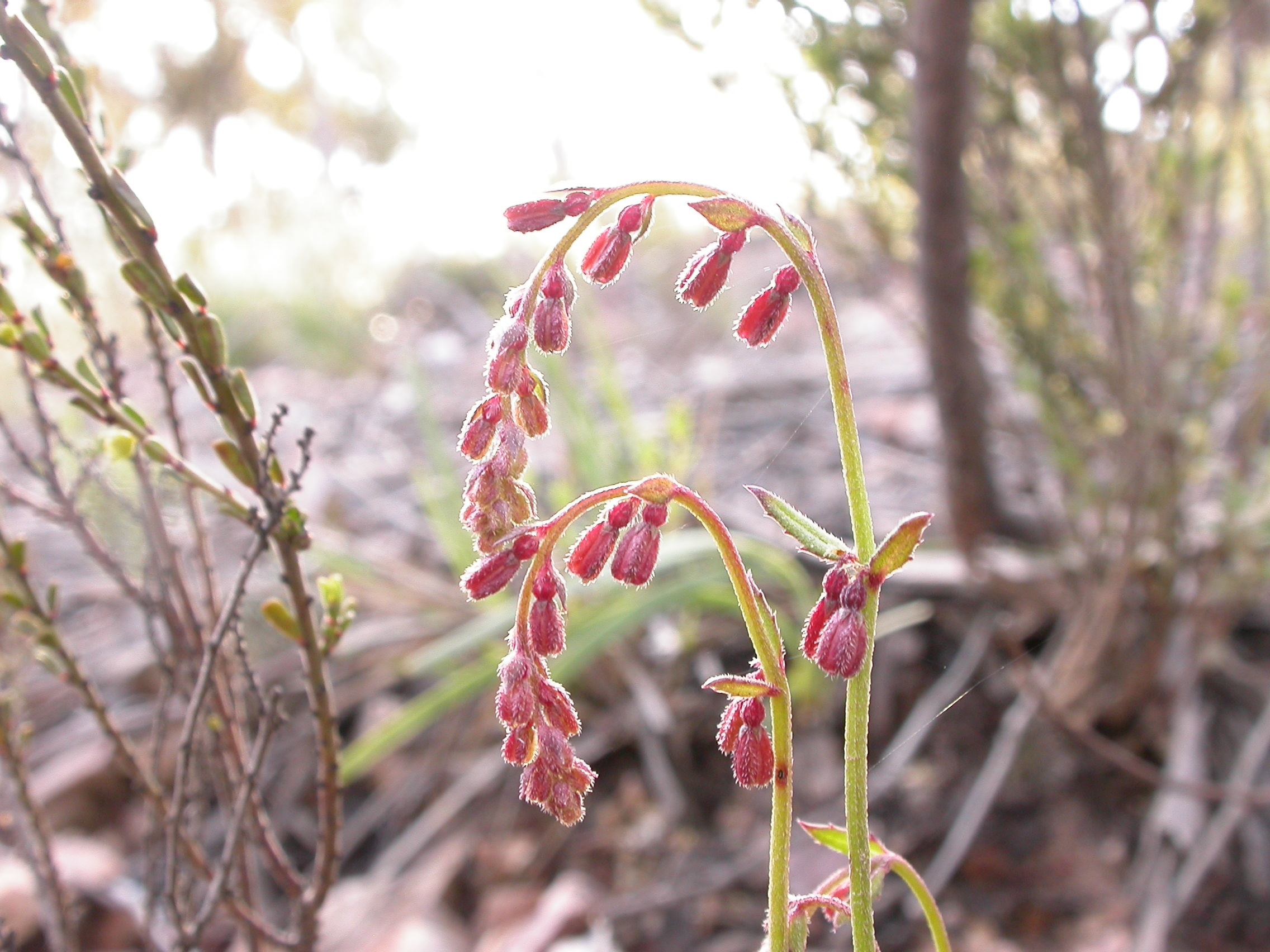

Scientific classification
- Kingdom: Plantae
- Clade: Tracheophytes
- Clade: Angiosperms
- Clade: Eudicots
- Order: Saxifragales
- Family: Haloragaceae
- Genus: Gonocarpus
- Species: G. tetragynus

Binomial name
- Gonocarpus tetragynus Labill.

Synonyms
- Synonymy: Gonocarpus tetragyna Labill.; Gonocarpus tenellus DC.; Haloragis gonocarpus Spreng.; Haloragis tetragyna (Labill.) Hook.f; Haloragis tetragyna var. hispida Schindl.; Halorrhagis tetragyna var. lanceolata Schindl.; Haloragis tetragyna var. decumbens Schindl.; Haloragis tetragyna var. serrata Schindl.; Halorrhagis tetragyna var. serrata Schindl.; Halorrhagis tetragyna var. hispida Schindl.; Haloragis tetragyna var. genuina Schindl.; Halorrhagis rubra Schindl.; Haloragis rubra Schindl.; Haloragis tetragyna var. lanceolata Schindl.; Halorrhagis tetragyna Schindl.; Halorrhagis tetragyna var. genuina Schindl.; Haloragis tetragyna var. bicallosa Schindl.; Halorrhagis tetragyna var. decumbens Schindl.

= Gonocarpus tetragynus =

Species of flowering plant

Gonocarpus tetragynus is an Australian herb in the watermilfoil family Haloragaceae native to eastern Australia. Common names include common raspwort. It is a widespread species particularly found in dry eucalyptus forests, scrubland, and heathland.

== Description ==
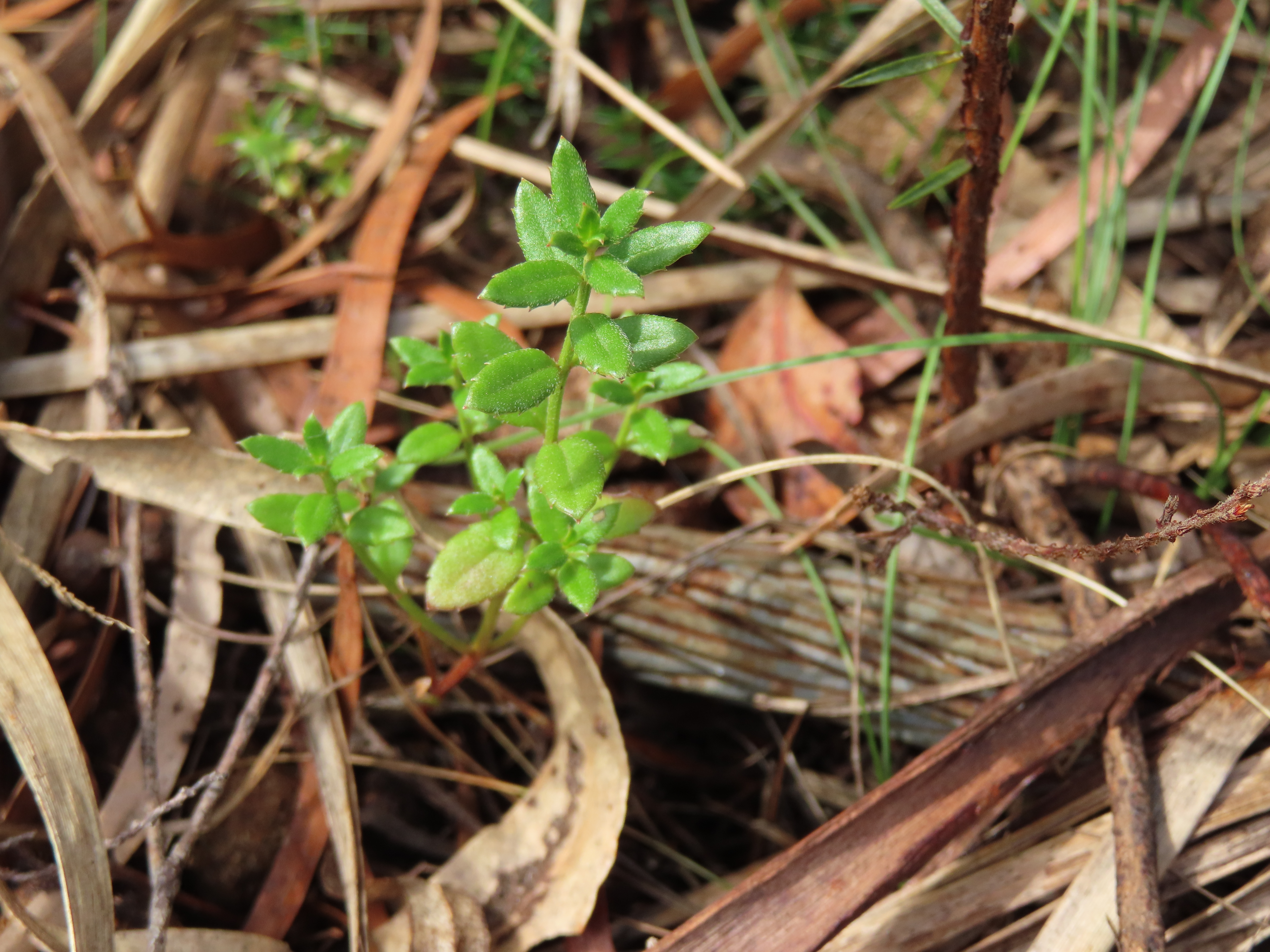
The wiry stems and opposite leaves of Gonocarpus tetragynus

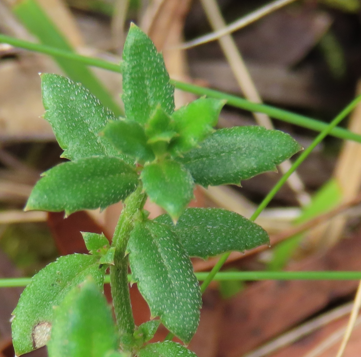
The even covering of white appraised hairs on the leaves and the stem

The herb can grow erect or ascend to 15-30 cm (5.9-11.8 in) tall. The many wiry branching stems can be smooth or are weakly 4-ribbed. Leaves are decussate, lanceolate and range from 0.6-1.2 cm (0.2-0.5 in) long. The leaf margins are thickened, irregularly toothed and recurved. The leaves are attached to petioles, 0.5-1 mm (0.020-0.039 in) long. The bracts are sessile, alternate, lanceolate, and range from 2-2.5 mm (0.079-0.098 in) long. The bracteoles are membranous, lanceolate to linear-lanceolate, 0.8-1.2 mm (0.031-0.047 in) long. Both the leaves and the stem are covered in white-appressed hairs, which gives a rough texture.

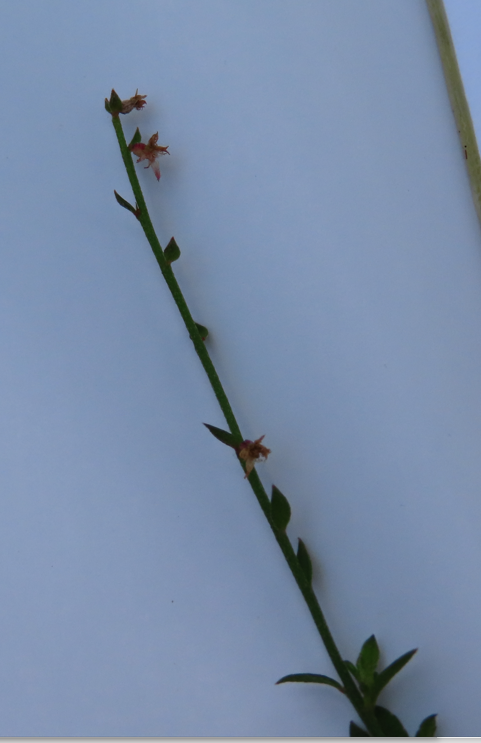
The inflorescence of Gonocarpus tetragynus after flowering

The species is perennial. The flowers are bisexual, but in the occasional individual, they become functionally female, after the abortion of the stamens and the petals. The flowering time ranges from spring to summer; as early as September and as late as February. The inflorescence is a spike with tiny solitary flowers which are 1-3 mm (0.039-0.12 in) across. Like in other members of the Haloragaceae family, the flowers are divided into four whorls. The sepals are deltoid and green, with a prominent basal callus. Petals range from green to red and are hooded and keeled. The herb has eight stamens and an 8-ribbed ovary.

The fruit is a dry nut, a family characteristic. The herb develops a ridged, globular nut. It is 1-1.3 mm (0.039-0.051 in) long. The colour ranges from silver-grey to slate grey.

== Taxonomy ==
Jacques Labillardière first formally described the species as G. tetragyna in 1805, as published in Novae Hollandiae Plantarum Specimen 1. Its variant, Gonocarpus tetragynus, was the accepted name by 2005, according to the Australian Plant Census of the same year.

Several other synonyms are known, including Goniocarpus tetragynus, Haloragis gonocarpus, Haloragis tetragyna, Halorrhagis tetragyna, Gonocarpus tenellus, Haloragis rubra, Halorrhagis rubra.

== Distribution and habitat ==
The species is widespread, in terrestrial Eastern Australia. It occurs in Queensland, New South Wales, ACT, Victoria, South Australia, and Tasmania. The herb can also be found in the Flinders and Clarke islands in the Bass Strait. While widespread it is particularly found in moist to dry soils in dry Eucalyptus forests, shrublands, and heathlands. In Tasmania, it is commonly found on dry stony outcrops.

Records of this species in other countries are based on miss identification of G. incanus, G. montanus, G. chinensis, and G. philippinensis.

== Distinguishing from similar species ==
Gonocarpus tetragynus is similar in appearance to Gonocarpus humilis. The two species can be distinguished by the former's lanceolate leaves, an even cover of white-appraised hairs and the flower's eight stamens.

== Cultivation ==
Cultivation of the species is possible, but it is not widely grown.
