= Serpicula =

Serpicula is a taxon synonym for three genera of plants

- Serpicula L. – synonym of Laurembergia P.J.Bergius
- Serpicula L.f. – synonym of Hydrilla Rich.
- Serpicula Pursh – synonym of Elodea Michx.
