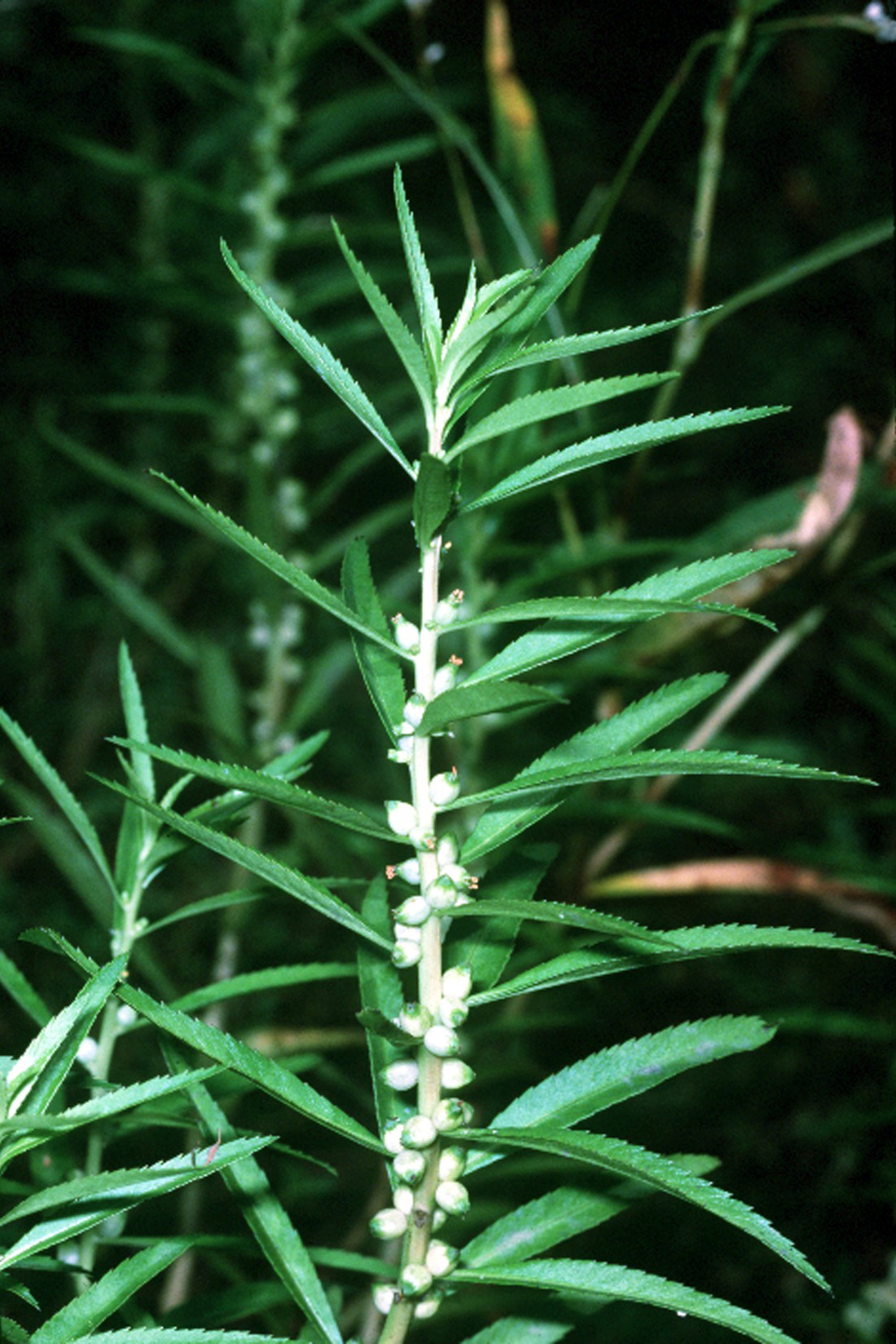

Conservation status
- Least Concern (IUCN 3.1)

- Secure (NatureServe)

Scientific classification
- Kingdom: Plantae
- Clade: Tracheophytes
- Clade: Angiosperms
- Clade: Eudicots
- Order: Saxifragales
- Family: Haloragaceae
- Genus: Proserpinaca
- Species: P. palustris

Binomial name
- Proserpinaca palustris L.

= Proserpinaca palustris =

Species of flowering plant

Proserpinaca palustris, the marsh mermaidweed or common mermaid-weed, is a species of flowering plant in the watermilfoil family (Haloragaceae). It is found in North America, the Caribbean, and Central America.

== Description ==
Proserpinaca palustris has submerged leaves, which are sessile, 2–6 cm (1–2 in) long. They are deeply divided into linear segments and the emergent leaves are simply serrated. Fruits have concave sides and sharp or winged angles. Leaves are divided into thread-like segments with a weak phloem and no xylem. The non-submerged leaves are broad with a serrated leaf margin and have a strong vascular system.

Proserpinaca palustris is heterophyllous, meaning that its leaves develop different morphology based on the environmental conditions. Humidity has been found to have the greatest impact on leaf variability. There is no standard internode length or leaf orientation. Exposure to intense high light or elevated temperatures has the most effect on the submerged shoots of long-day plants, causing them to produce transitional leaf forms. Proserpinaca palustris has fruit that is dry but does not split or burst when ripe. Proserpinaca palustris has an alternate leaf arrangement and radially symmetrical flowers, whose petals are fused into a cup-like shape. The stem of the plant ranges in color from green, brown, orange, to pink, with bright green to orange frond-like leaves.

== Taxonomy and nomenclature ==
There are two varieties currently recognized by the International Plant Names Index: P. palustris var. australis and P. palustris var. palustris. Proserpinaca palustris L. has eight synonyms listed in the World Flora Online Plant List: P. heterophyla, P. serrata, P. tuberculate, P. palustris var. crebra, P. palustris var. palustris, P. amblygona, P. palustris var. pectinate, P. platycarpa, and P. palustris var. amblyogona. Several of these synonyms were once considered distinct varieties but have been reclassified by the World Flora Online Plant Index as of 2024. However, there is still debate about whether P. palustris var. crebra should be classified as a valid variety, with proponents distinguishing it through habitat and width of fruit.

== Distribution and habitat ==
Proserpinaca palustris is commonly found in freshwater swamps, marshes, bogs, ponds, and shorelines in temperate climates in the Americas. It is found in the eastern half of North America, the Caribbean, Central America, and the southern coast of South America. It was recently observed as a probably introduction in the wetlands of the Southern Appalachian Mountains in North Carolina. This is common, as P. palustris is often found in disturbed areas, such as roadsides and ditches. The Flora of the Southeastern US classifies P. palustris as a secure global species and is most abundant in the coastal plain of eastern North America, though not found in brackish water or saltwater. According to the IUCN, it is not currently threatened and is listed as a species of least concern on the IUCN Red List and as secure by the Canadian Endangered Species Conservation Council. However, though it is classified as a secure species, there are several states in the United States of America and several provinces in Canada whose populations are considered to be 'Imperiled' or 'Critically Imperiled'.

== Uses ==
Proserpinaca palustris is used commercially as decoration for aquariums, as they grow much slower and smaller in controlled environments like fish tanks. They act as habitat enrichment and a method of beautification.

== Etymology ==
Proserpinanca palustris gets its name from the myth of Proserpina, or Persephone, the ancient Roman and Greek goddess of spring and the underworld. Carl Linnaeus drew inspiration from Pliny the Elder's Natural History when naming the plant, as a reference to the plant picked by Proserpina at the time of her abduction. Linnaeus saw a connection between the plant's ability to adapt to its environment and Proserpina's annual switch between the world of the living and the world of the dead. Parallels were drawn to Proserpina's duality of existence and heterophyllous leaves of P. palustris.

== Identification ==
Proserpinaca palistrus is often confused with Proserpinaca pectinata but can be distinguished through leaf and flower arrangement. Proserpinaca palustris is characterized as having flowers subtended by toothed bracts and leaf blades that measure between 20 and 40 mm (0.79 and 1.57 in) in length from tip to base, with the lower leaf blades being divided into 7 to 14 pairs of segments. Proserpinaca pectinata has flowers that are subtended by pinnately lobed or pinnately divided bracts and leaf blades that measure between 10 and 30 mm (0.39 and 1.18 in) in length, with lower leaf blades that are divided into 6 to 9 pairs of segments.

== Gallery ==
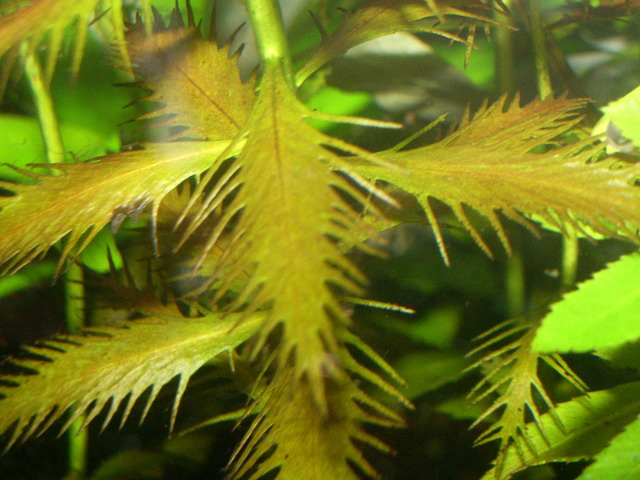
Leaves

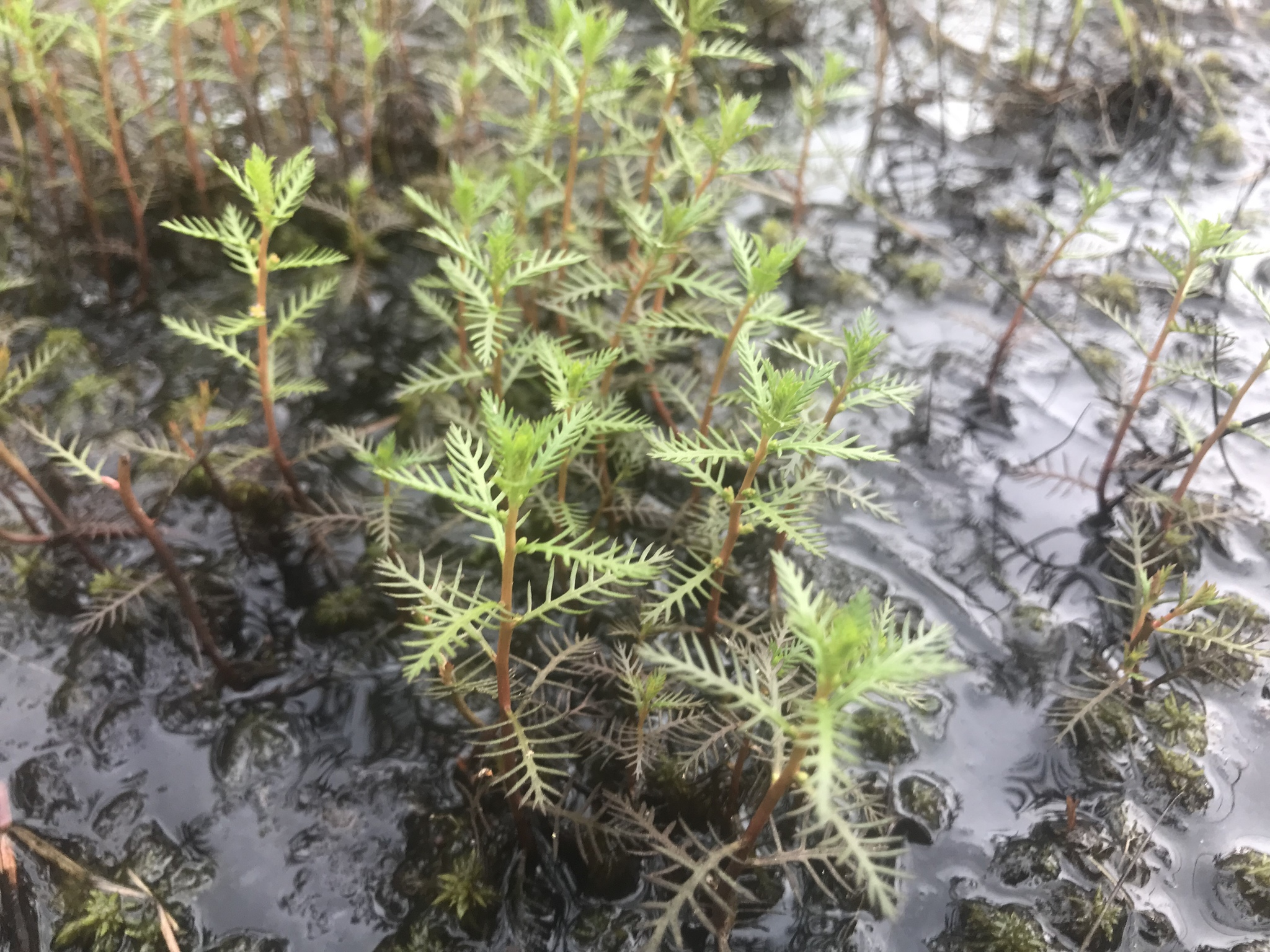
Habit
