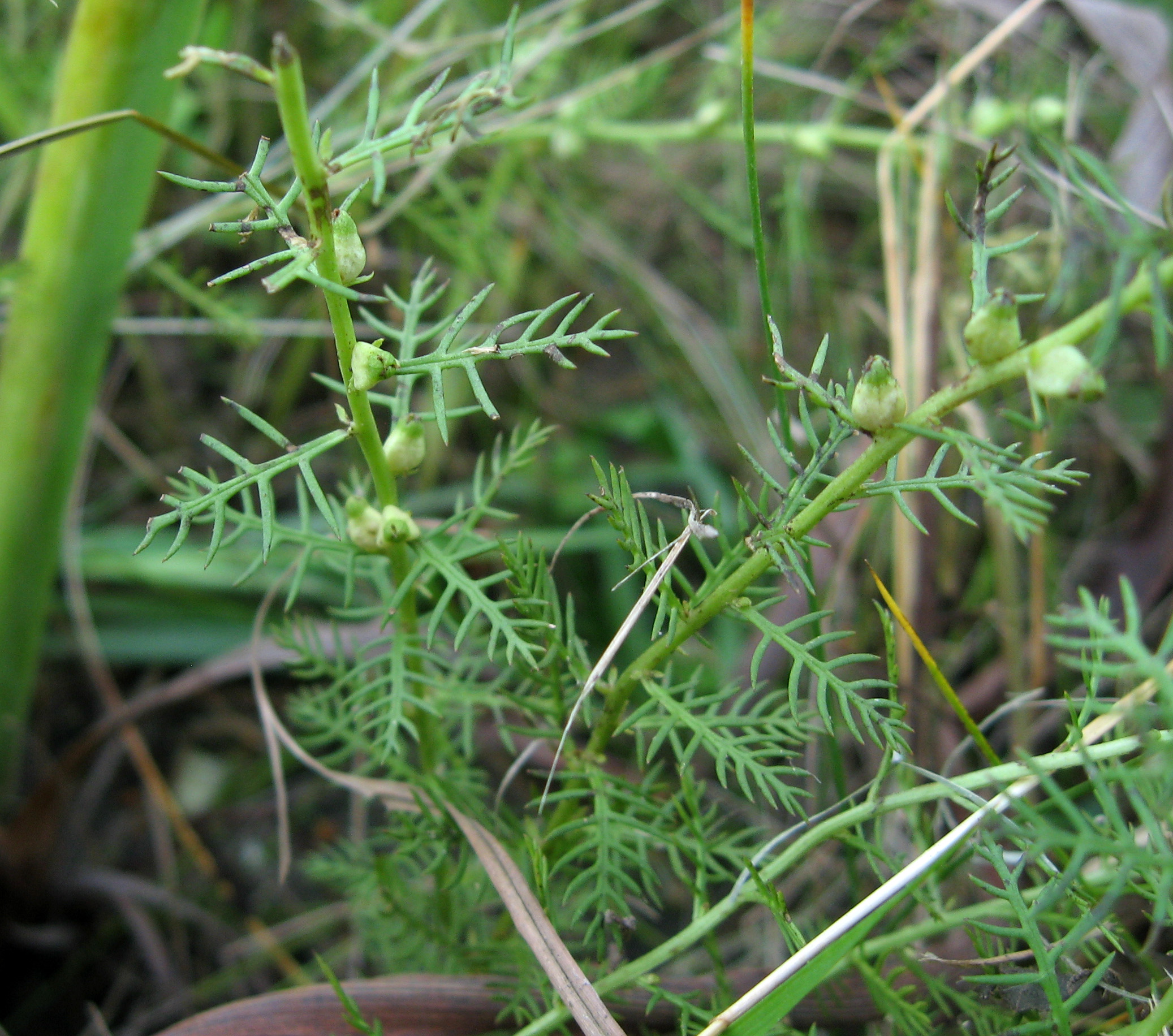
- Proserpinaca pectinata in fruit

Scientific classification
- Kingdom: Plantae
- Clade: Tracheophytes
- Clade: Angiosperms
- Clade: Eudicots
- Order: Saxifragales
- Family: Haloragaceae
- Genus: Proserpinaca; L.

Species
- See text

= Proserpinaca =

Genus of flowering plants

Proserpinaca, commonly called mermaidweed, is a genus of flowering plants in the watermilfoil family (Haloragaceae). It is a small genus, comprising only two to three extant species, all of which are native to eastern North America and the West Indies. All species in this genus are found in aquatic or terrestrial wetland habitats.

Proserpinaca can be distinguished from its relative Myriophyllum by having 3 stamens and carpels per flower (as opposed to having 4 or 8).

== Species ==
Two or three extant species are known from this genus, depending on the treatment. They are:

- Proserpinaca intermedia - Uncommon in the southeastern U.S.; intermediate in characteristics, and it is unclear if it is best treated as a hybrid
- Proserpinaca palustris - Widespread in eastern North America and the West Indies
- Proserpinaca pectinata - Native primarily to the Southeast Coastal Plain, with disjunct populations in middle Tennessee

== Fossil record ==
15 fossil fruits of †Proserpinaca ervinii from the early Miocene, have been found in the Kristina Mine at Hrádek nad Nisou in North Bohemia, the Czech Republic. Two fossil fruits of †Proserpinaca previcarpa have been described from middle Miocene strata of the Fasterholt area near Silkeborg in Central Jutland, Denmark.
