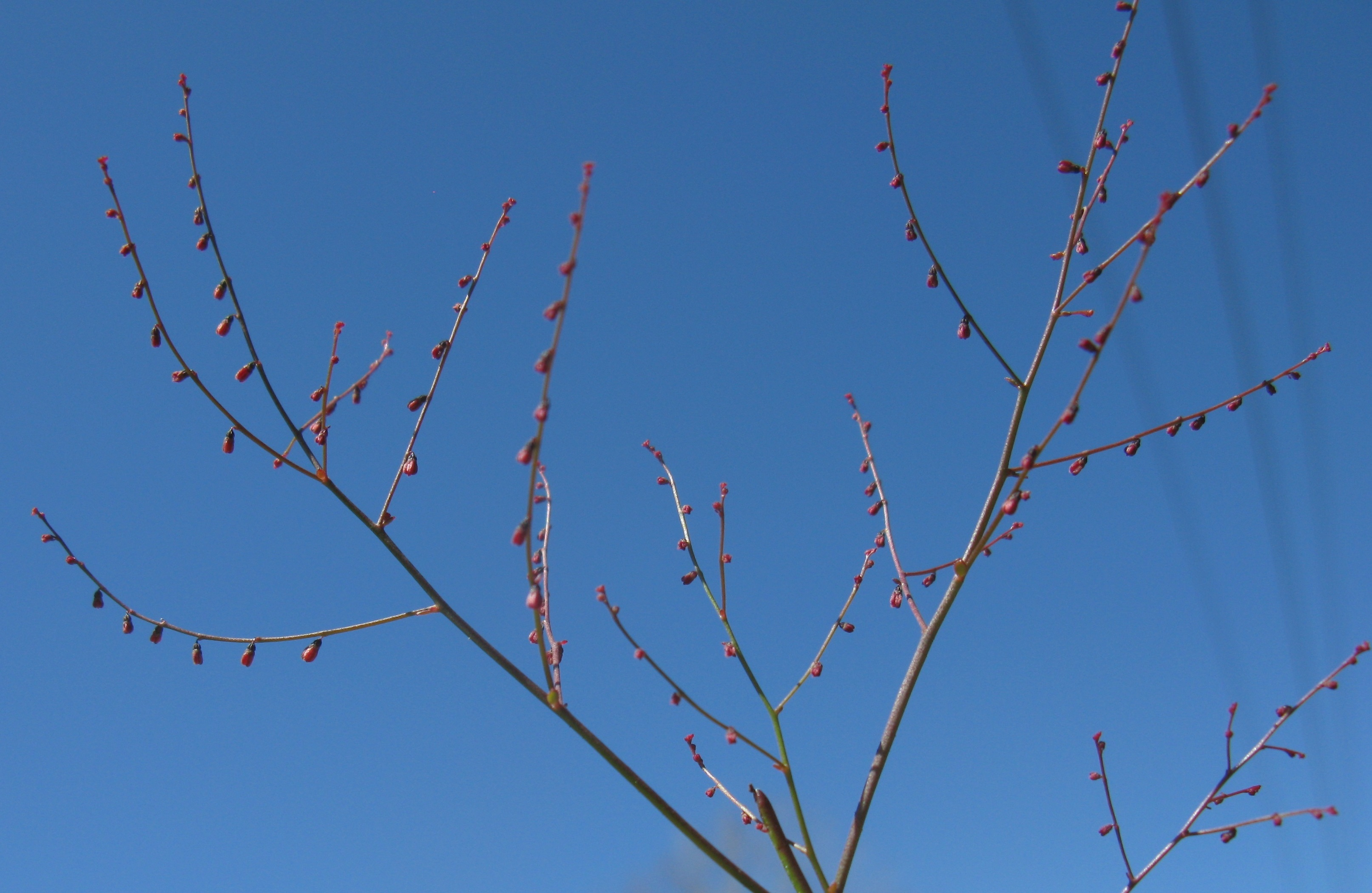
- Gonocarpus micranthus

Scientific classification
- Kingdom: Plantae
- Clade: Tracheophytes
- Clade: Angiosperms
- Clade: Eudicots
- Order: Saxifragales
- Family: Haloragaceae
- Genus: Gonocarpus; Thunb.

Species
- See text

= Gonocarpus =

Genus of flowering plants

The Gonocarpus of William Hamilton ("Ham.") is a synonym of Combretum.

Gonocarpus (raspwort) is a genus of flowering plants in the family Haloragaceae. The species, which are native to Australia, New Zealand and Malesia, include:

- Gonocarpus acanthocarpus (Brongn.) Orchard
- Gonocarpus benthamii Orchard
- Gonocarpus chinensis (Lour.) Orchard
- Gonocarpus confertifolius (F.Muell.) Orchard
- Gonocarpus cordiger (Fenzl) Nees
- Gonocarpus diffusus (Diels) Orchard
- Gonocarpus effusus Orchard
- Gonocarpus elatus (A.Cunn. ex Fenzl) Orchard - hill raspwort, tall raspwort
- Gonocarpus ephemerus Orchard
- Gonocarpus eremophilus Orchard
- Gonocarpus ericifolius Orchard
- Gonocarpus hexandrus (F.Muell.) Orchard
- Gonocarpus hirtus Orchard
- Gonocarpus hispidus Orchard
- Gonocarpus humilis Orchard - shade raspwort
- Gonocarpus implexus Orchard
- Gonocarpus intricatus (Benth.) Orchard
- Gonocarpus leptothecus (F.Muell.) Orchard
- Gonocarpus longifolius (Schindl.) Orchard
- Gonocarpus mezianus (Schindl.) Orchard - hairy raspwort
- Gonocarpus micranthus Thunb. - creeping raspwort (subsp. micranthus)
- Gonocarpus montanus (Hook.f.) Orchard - mat raspwort
- Gonocarpus nodulosus Nees
- Gonocarpus oreophilus Orchard
- Gonocarpus paniculatus (Benth.) Orchard
- Gonocarpus pithyoides Nees
- Gonocarpus pusillus (Benth.) Orchard
- Gonocarpus pycnostachyus (F.Muell.) Orchard
- Gonocarpus rotundifolius Drake
- Gonocarpus rudis (Benth.) Orchard
- Gonocarpus salsoloides Reichb. ex Spreng.
- Gonocarpus scordioides (Benth.) Orchard
- Gonocarpus serpyllifolius Hook.f. - flat raspwort
- Gonocarpus simplex (Britten) Orchard
- Gonocarpus tetragynus Labill. - common raspwort
- Gonocarpus teucrioides DC. - germander raspwort
- Gonocarpus trichostachyus (Benth.) Orchard
- Gonocarpus urceolatus Orchard
- Gonocarpus vernicosus Hook.f.
