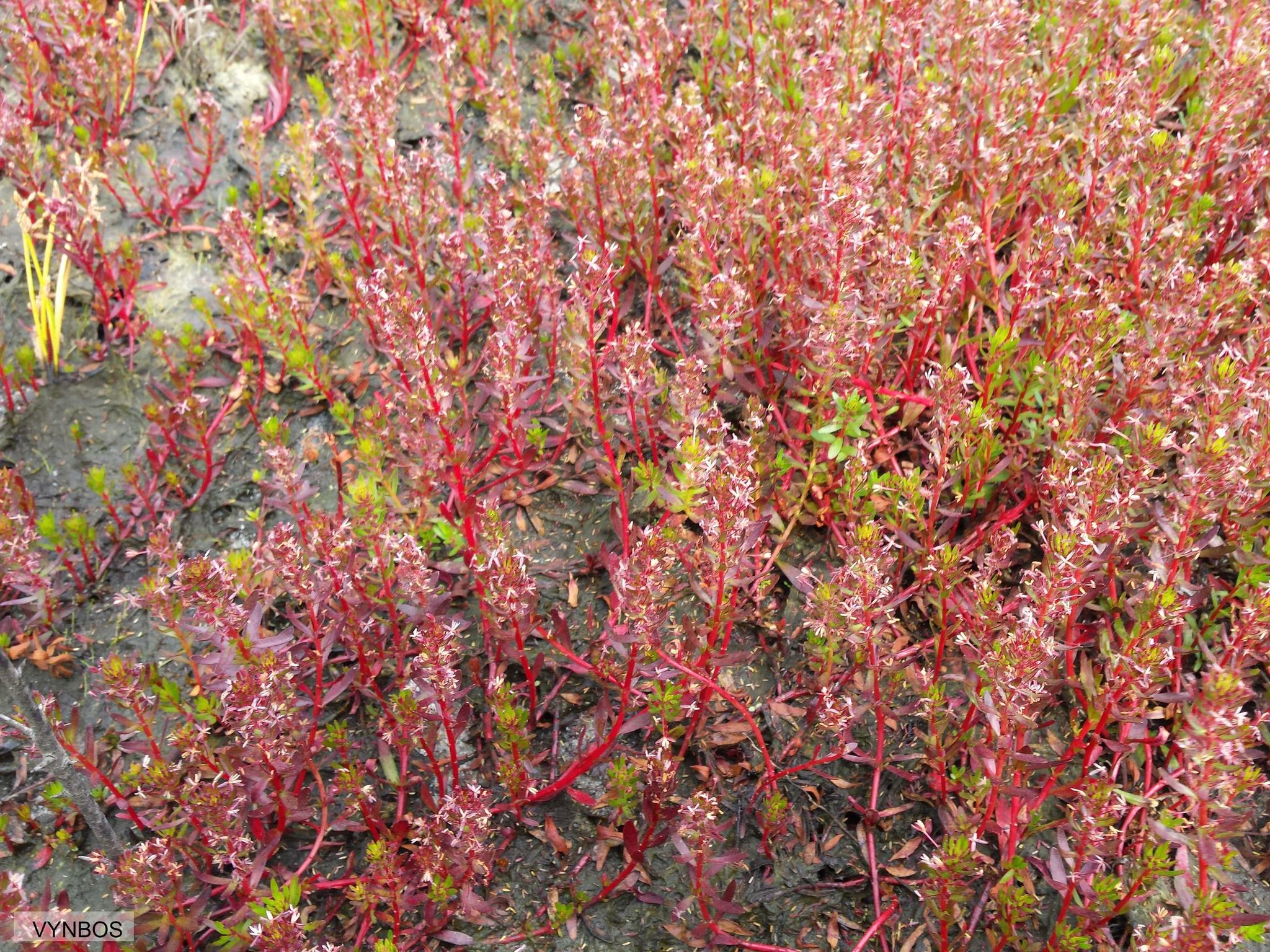
- Laurembergia repens

Scientific classification
- Kingdom: Plantae
- Clade: Tracheophytes
- Clade: Angiosperms
- Clade: Eudicots
- Order: Saxifragales
- Family: Haloragaceae
- Genus: Laurembergia; P.J.Bergius

= Laurembergia =

Genus of plants

Laurembergia is a semiaquatic genus of plant in the watermilfoil family, Haloragaceae. It is endemic to Southern Africa.

== Species ==
There are 7 species assigned to this genus:

- Laurembergia coccinea
- Laurembergia minor
- Laurembergia repens
- Laurembergia tetrandra
- Laurembergia veronicifolia
- Laurembergia walkeri
- Laurembergia zeylanica
