= Anthony Orchard =

Australian botanist (born 1946)

- Born: 22 May 1946 (age 79); Adelaide, South Australia
- Scientific career
- Fields: Botany, Rosaceae, Haloragaceae, Asteraceae, Rubiaceae
- Author abbrev. (botany): Orchard

Anthony Orchard (born 22 May 1946) is a retired botanist who worked at the State Herbarium of South Australia. His main interests were the study of the genera Rosaceae, Haloragaceae, Asteraceae and Rubiaceae.

Anthony (Tony) Orchard is a systematic botanist who, prior to his retirement, collected widely across Australia and New Zealand. Most of the specimens are in the Adelaide and Hobart herbaria. He had editorial and executive roles related to the publication of the Flora of Australia and the Australian Plant Census.

== Standard author abbreviation ==
The standard author abbreviation Orchard is used to indicate this person as the author when citing a botanical name.
