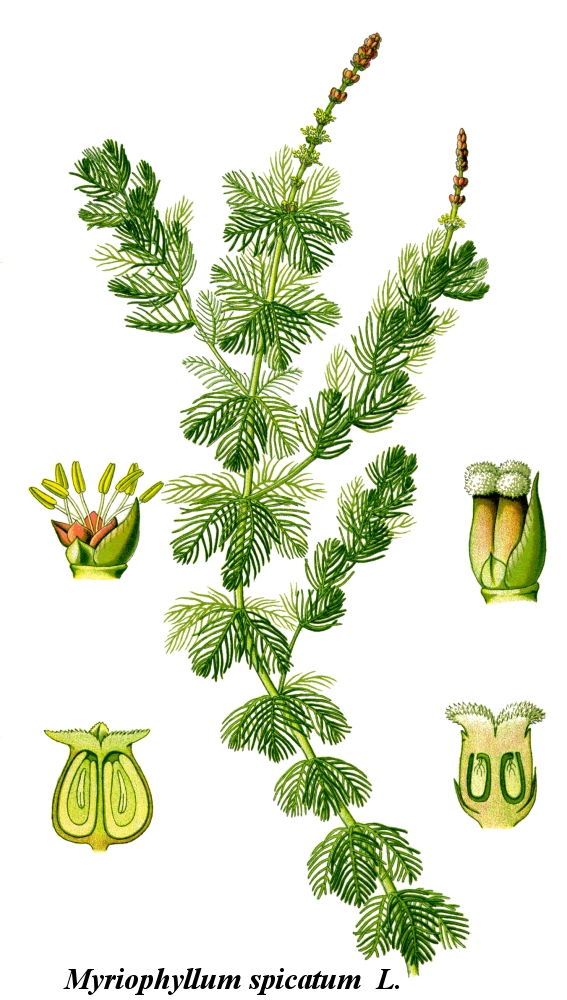
- Myriophyllum spicatum

Scientific classification
- Kingdom: Plantae
- Clade: Tracheophytes
- Clade: Angiosperms
- Clade: Eudicots
- Order: Saxifragales
- Family: Haloragaceae; R.Br.

Genera
- See text

= Haloragaceae =

Family of flowering plants

- Floral formula
- ✶$\mathrm{K}^{3-4}$$\mathrm{C}^{3-4}$ or $\mathrm{C}^0$$\mathrm{A}^{2-8}$$\mathrm{G}^{\overline{(2-4)}}$

Haloragaceae (the watermilfoil family) is a eudicot flowering plant family in the order Saxifragales, based on the phylogenetic APG system. In the Cronquist system, it was included in the order Haloragales.

== Description ==
The Haloragaceae (alternate spelling Halorrhagidaceae) are very diverse in habit, including both small trees and submerged aquatics. Most members of the Haloragaceae are herbaceous, and most of those in turn are perennials, though some species are annuals. In contrast however, members of the genus Haloragodendron are woody. Most species of Myriophyllum are monoecious while most other taxa have hermaphrodite flowers. The flowers are usually small and inconspicuous, but some genera can have more "showy" conspicuous flowers (Haloragodendron, Glischrocaryon). Flowers are usually radially symmetrical, and unusual for core eudicots, merosity is (2-3)-4 parted. Petals are usually keeled or hooded when present. In Myriophyllum, female flowers usually lack a perianth. They have (2-)4-8 stamens and an inferior ovary of (2-)4 carpels. In Myriophyllum, the fruit is a schizocarp of 1-seeded 'nutlets'. Other genera can have nuts or drupes that can be winged or inflated. The genus Gunnera, formerly included here, are now in the separate family Gunneraceae.

== Taxonomy ==
=== Phylogeny ===
Molecular phylogenetic studies, in particular, the APG system, placed the Haloragaceae within the core eudicot order, Saxifragales. Earlier versions of the APG had allowed either the broader circumscription (Haloragaceae s.l.) or a narrower Haloragaceae s.s..

Cladogram of Saxifragales families

- Saxifragales
  - Peridiscaceae (4)
  - 97
    - - Paeonia (Paeoniaceae)
      - woody clade
        - Liquidambar (Altingiaceae)
        - 69
          - 98
            Hamamelidaceae (27)
          - 95
            - Cercidiphyllum (Cercidiphyllaceae)
            - Daphniphyllum (Daphniphyllaceae)
    - core Saxifragales
      - - Crassulaceae (34)
        - Haloragaceae s.l.
          - Aphanopetalum (Aphanopetalaceae)
          - - Tetracarpaea (Tetracarpaeaceae)
            - - Penthorum (Penthoraceae)
              - Haloragaceae s.s. (8)
      - Saxifragaceae alliance
        - - Iteaceae (including Pterostemonaceae) (2)
        - - Ribes (Grossulariaceae)
          - Saxifragaceae (33)

Cynomorium (Cynomoriaceae) remains unplaced within this tree

=== Subdivision ===
==== History ====
Historically, the Haloragaceae included many disparate genera, since segregated. A major circumscription was carried out by Schindler in 1905, dividing the "Halorrhagaceae" into two subfamilies (Halorrhagoideae and Gunneroideae) and the former into two tribes (Halorrhageae and Myriophylleae), with a total of seven genera. He removed some of the disparate genera and merged Gonocarpus and Meionectes into Haloragis. This classification long remained the standard till Shaw (1966) removed Gunnera (into its own family Gunneraceae, within the order Gunnerales), the sole genus in Gunneroideae, leaving six genera. This situation remained until the monograph of Orchard (1975). Orchard restored Gonocarpus and split Haloragodendron from Haloragis, leaving 8 genera.
List of genera, habitat, distribution (Number of species)

- Terrestrial
  - Glischrocaryon Endl. Australia (4)
  - Gonocarpus Thunb. Australia, New Zealand, S. E. Asia (36)
  - Haloragis J.R.Forst. & G.Forst. Australia, New Zealand, S. Pacific (26)
  - Haloragodendron Orchard Australia (5)
- Semiaquatic
  - Laurembergia P.J.Bergius Pantropical (4)
- Aquatic
  - Meziella Schindl. S. W. Australia (1)
  - Myriophyllum L. Cosmopolitan (60)
  - Proserpinaca L. New World (3)

==== Molecular era ====
A molecular study resolved the infrafamilial relationships among the genera, resulting in some taxonomic revision, including redistribution of species. In addition, Meionectes was reinstated, separating two species from Haloragis and creating a new monotypic genus, Trihaloragis by segregating Gonocarpus hexandrus. Consequently, the number of genera is increased to ten, with the addition of:

- Meionectes R.Br. (2)
- Trihaloragis Moody & Les (1)

Glischrocaryon-Haloragodendron is resolved as the basal node, sister to the remaining family. While monophyly of this group is well supported, monophyly of the two separate genera is less well supported, and suggests some paraphyly. Thus the generic limits remain unresolved.

A subsequent, more detailed study of Myriophyllum demonstrated that the monotypic genus Meziella was embedded within it, leading to its submersion within the former as Myriophyllum subgenus Meziella, thereby reducing the number of genera within the family to 9.

==== Species ====
As of 2014, the family has 138 species, distributed among the nine genera as follows:

- Glischrocaryon (4)
- Gonocarpus (36)
- Haloragis (24)
- Haloragodendron (6)
- Laurembergia (4)
- Myriophyllum (60)
- Proserpinaca (2)
- Meionectes (2)
- Trihaloragis (1)

== Distribution and habitat ==
The distribution of the family is nearly worldwide. The center of species diversity is in Australia where all genera are found excepting Proserpinaca and Laurembergia. Habitats vary from arid desert regions to freshwater lakes. The terrestrial genera (Glischrocaryon, Gonocarpus, Haloragis, Haloragodendron, Trihaloragis) are primarily limited to the Southern Hemisphere. Meionectes, Meziella, Myriophyllum and Proserpinaca are aquatic, while Laurembergia are semiaquatic. Glischrocaryon, Haloragodendron, Meionectes and Trihaloragis are Australian endemics, where about 70% of all species are found. For detailed maps of the distribution of each genus, see Chen et al (2014) Figure 1.

== Bibliography ==
=== Books and theses ===
- Byng, James W. (2014). "Haloragaceae". The Flowering Plants Handbook: A practical guide to families and genera of the world. Plant Gateway Ltd. p. 165. ISBN 978-0-9929993-1-5.
- Christenhusz, Maarten J. M.; Fay, Michael F.; Chase, Mark W. (2017). "Saxifragales". Plants of the World: An Illustrated Encyclopedia of Vascular Plants. University of Chicago Press. pp. 231–244. ISBN 978-0-226-52292-0.
- Kubitzki, Klaus, ed. (2007). Flowering Plants. Eudicots: Berberidopsidales, Buxales, Crossosomatales, Fabales p.p., Geraniales, Gunnerales, Myrtales p.p., Proteales, Saxifragales, Vitales, Zygophyllales, Clusiaceae Alliance, Passifloraceae Alliance, Dilleniaceae, Huaceae, Picramniaceae, Sabiaceae. The Families and Genera of Vascular Plants. Vol. IX. Springer. ISBN 978-3-540-32219-1.
  - Kubitzki, Klaus (2007a). Haloragaceae. pp. 184–190., in Kubitzki (2007)
- Les, Donald H. (2017). Aquatic Dicotyledons of North America: Ecology, Life History, and Systematics. CRC Press. ISBN 978-1-351-64440-2.
- Moody, Michael Lee (2004). Systematics of the angiosperm family Haloragaceae R. Br. emphasizing the aquatic genus Myriophyllum: Phylogeny, hybridization and character evolution (PhD thesis). University of Connecticut.
- Orchard, Anthony Edward (1972). Taxonomic revisions in the family Haloragaceae R. Br (PhD thesis). Department of Botany, University of Adelaide.
- Schindler, A.K. (1905). "Halorrhagaceae". In Engler, Adolf (ed.). Das Pflanzenreich: regni vegetablilis conspectus (in Latin and German). Vol. 23. Leipzig: W. Engelmann.
- Willis, John Christopher; Shaw, Herbert Kenneth Airy (1966). A Dictionary of the Flowering Plants and Ferns (7th ed.). Cambridge U.P.

=== Articles ===
- Angiosperm Phylogeny Group IV (2016). "An update of the Angiosperm Phylogeny Group classification for the orders and families of flowering plants: APG IV". Botanical Journal of the Linnean Society. 181 (1): 1–20. doi:10.1111/boj.12385.
- Chen, Ling-Yun; Zhao, Shu-Ying; Mao, Kang-Shan; Les, Donald H.; Wang, Qing-Feng; Moody, Michael L. (September 2014). "Historical biogeography of Haloragaceae: An out-of-Australia hypothesis with multiple intercontinental dispersals" (PDF). Molecular Phylogenetics and Evolution. 78: 87–95. doi:10.1016/j.ympev.2014.04.030. PMID 24841538.
- Christenhusz, Maarten JM & Byng, J. W. (2016). "The number of known plants species in the world and its annual increase". Phytotaxa. 261 (3). Magnolia Press: 201–217. doi:10.11646/phytotaxa.261.3.1.
- Jian, Shuguang; Soltis, Pamela S.; Gitzendanner, Matthew A.; Moore, Michael J.; Li, Ruiqi; Hendry, Tory A.; Qiu, Yin-Long; Dhingra, Amit; Bell, Charles D.; Soltis, Douglas E. (February 2008). "Resolving an ancient, rapid radiation in Saxifragales". Systematic Biology. 57 (1): 38–57. doi:10.1080/10635150801888871. PMID 18275001.
- Moody, Michael L.; Les, Donald H. (2007). "Phylogenetic Systematics and Character Evolution in the Angiosperm Family Haloragaceae" (PDF). American Journal of Botany. 94 (12): 2005–2025. doi:10.3732/ajb.94.12.2005. ISSN 0002-9122. JSTOR 27733378. PMID 21636395. Supplement Archived 2022-03-05 at the Wayback Machine
- Moody, M.L.; Les, D. H. (2010). "Systematics of the Aquatic Angiosperm genus Myriophyllum (Haloragaceae)" (PDF). Systematic Botany. 35 (1): 121–139. doi:10.1600/036364410790862470. S2CID 52999042.
- Orchard, A.E. (1975). "Taxonomic revisions in the family Haloragaceae. 1. The genera Haloragis, Haloragodendron, Glischrocaryon, Meziella and Gonocarpus ". Bulletin of the Auckland Institute and Museum. 10: 1–299.
- Orchard, A E (1977). "Taxonomic revisions in the family Haloragaceae. 2. Further notes on Haloragus, Haloragodendron and Gonocarpus". Nuytsia. 2 (3): 126–144.
- Orchard, A. E. (1979). "Myriophyllum (Haloragaceae) in Australasia. I. New Zealand: A Revision of the Genus and a Synopsis of the Family". Brunonia. 2: 247–287. doi:10.1071/bru9850173.
- Orchard, A E (1986). "New taxa in Gonocarpus and Haloragis (Haloragaceae)". Nuytsia. 5 (3): 327–340.

=== Websites ===
- Orchard, A E (2019). Kodela, Phillip (ed.). "Haloragaceae R.Br". Flora of Australia Online vol.18. ABRS.
- POWO (2019). "Haloragaceae R.Br". Plants of the World Online. Royal Botanic Gardens, Kew.
- "Haloragaceae". VicFlora: Flora of Victoria. Royal Botanic Gardens Victoria.
- "Haloragaceae R.Br". FloraBase—the Western Australian Flora. Western Australian Herbarium.
- "Family Haloragaceae". PlantNET - FloraOnline. The Royal Botanic Garden, Sydney.
- Stevens, P.F. (2019) [2001]. "Saxifragales". AP Web v. 14. Missouri Botanical Garden. (see also Angiosperm Phylogeny Website)
- Chen, Jiarui; Funston, Michele (2004). "Haloragaceae". pp. 427–428., in Flora of China online vol. 13
