= Jelena de Belder-Kovačič =

Slovenian-Belgian botanist and horticulturist

- Born: Jelena Kovačič; 23 August 1925; Jasenovac, Kingdom of Yugoslavia
- Died: 31 August 2003 (aged 78); Krk, Croatia
- Other name: Jelena de Belder
- Occupations: horticulturist, botanist
- Years active: 1955–2003

Jelena de Belder-Kovačič (23 August 1925 – 31 August 2003) was a Slovenian-Belgian botanist and horticulturist, who worked extensively on the taxonomy and preservation of plant specimens, gaining an international reputation for her development of the Kalmthout and Hemelrijk Arboreta. Several varieties of plants she cultivated were recognized with awards from the Royal Horticultural Society in London and she was elevated to Baroness by Albert II of Belgium for her contributions to dendrology.

== Early life ==
Kovačič was born on 23 August 1925 in Jasenovac, Kingdom of Serbs, Croats, and Slovenes (later known as Kingdom of Yugoslavia) in present-day Croatia, to parents Andrej and Elza (née Zorčič). Her parents were ethnically Slovene, originally from Bizeljsko, a village in the modern municipality of Brežice in Slovenia, on the border with Croatia.

At the time of her birth, her father Andrej was employed as an agronomist on the large Belje estate in the Baranya region in what is now eastern Croatia. She attended elementary school in Kneževo and went on to study at the gymnasiums in Osijek and Ptuj. After completing her secondary education, and after World War II, Kovačič enrolled at the University of Zagreb in 1947. Graduating in 1951, with a degree in agronomy, she worked for a year at the city nursery on the outskirts of Zagreb and then in 1953 she was granted a rare permit from the now communist Yugoslavia to continue her studies abroad. She spent 1953 in Denmark, studying at the Petersen nursery and traveled on to Germany to study at horticultural sites in Schleswig-Holstein. The following year, she arrived in Zundert in the Netherlands to study at the Lombarts Nursery.

Hearing that there were historical and rare Stewartia pseudocamellia trees at the old Kort Nursery in Kalmthout, Kovačič bicycled to the site. She discovered that the nursery, founded in 1856 had closed in 1930, but had been purchased in 1952 by a diamond merchant, Robert De Belder and his brother Georges. The brothers became interested in the site when the ancient collection of trees were in danger of being cleared for a housing project. They purchased the plot and expanded the acquisition to encompass about 30 acres (12.5 hectares), attempting to protect the most significant varieties of trees. The brothers also founded the International Dendrology Society (IDS) at Kalmthout in 1952, to promote preservation and conservation of rare or endangered woody plants. During her visit, Kovačič suggested that Robert try propagating his witch hazel plants from cuttings, rather than by transplantation. Joined by their interest in plants, a romance developed between Robert and Kovačič, who were married within three months and she permanently settled in Belgium.

== Career ==
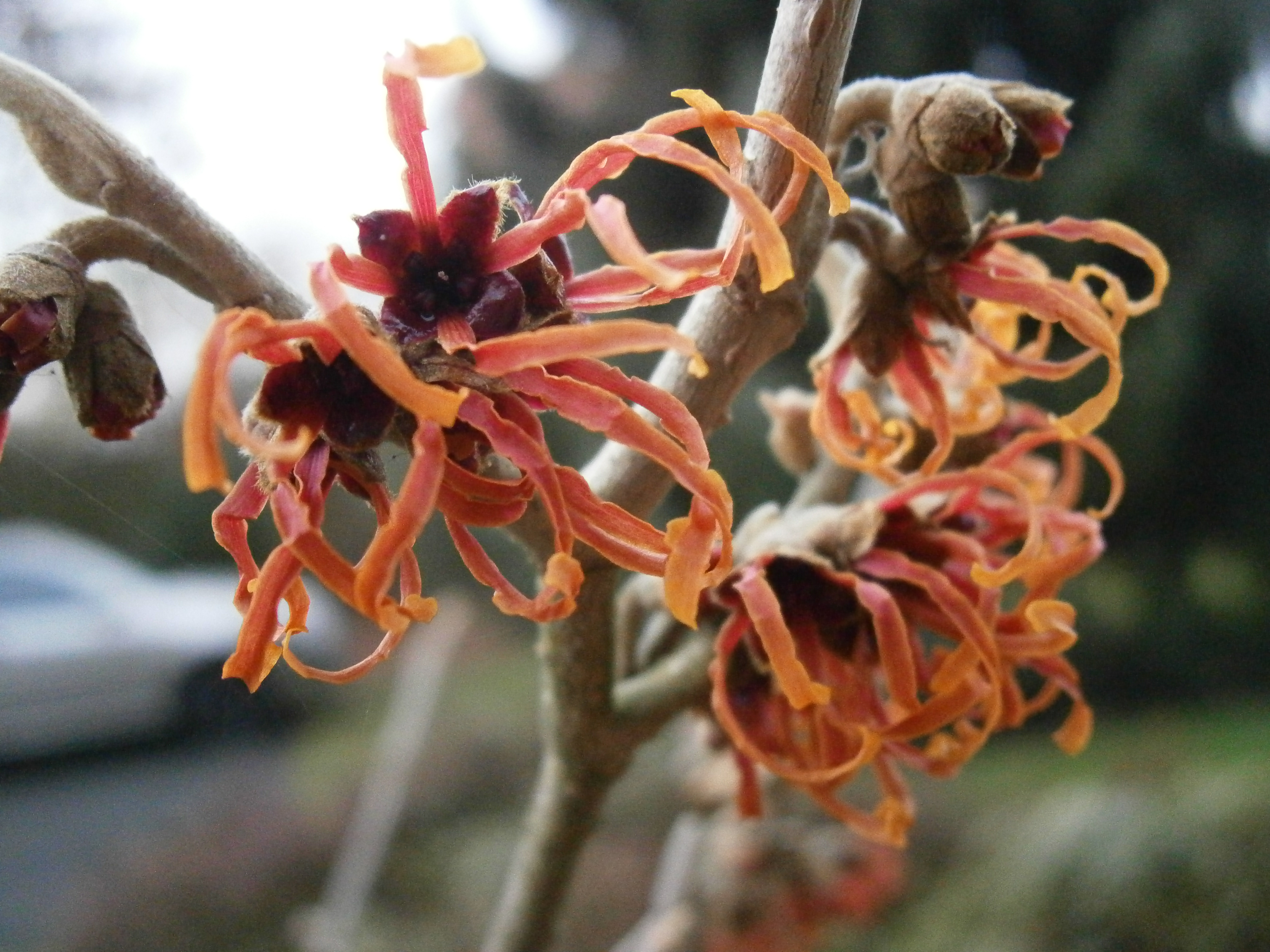
Hamamelis × intermedia 'Jelena'

The first witch hazel grown from cuttings on the property, which would become known as the Arboretum Kalmthout, bloomed in January 1955. The shrub had intense orange-brown flowers which reflected the winter sun. Robert named the variety, Hamamelis × intermedia Jelena and entered it that year at an exhibition held in London by the Royal Horticultural Society. The shrub earned a Certificate of Merit, leading the couple to design what would become one of the most well-known arboreta in the world. While Robert worked by day in the diamond business in Antwerp, she focused on sorting through the over-grown landscape to label and identify the plants. In the evenings and when he was not working, Robert worked with Georges to dig the ponds and create the vistas while de Belder worked to develop the plants for the spaces they created.

In April 1955, the couple invited Jože Strgar(sl) to the estate to study and de Belder paved the way for his studies with other European nurseries. Within ten years, the arboretum had reached capacity and the couple bought another, much larger estate, Hemelrijk in Essen, Belgium, containing 250 acres (101.171 hectares). Traveling widely with the International Dendrology Society, the couple collected specimens and created an international exchange network for plant seeds and educational sharing. They also created an extensive library of rare books on botany and horticulture. Known for their open-door policy of inviting students as well as the general public to study at the facility, the couple hosted more than 350 students, including noted Japanese botanist, Mikinori Ogisu.

De Belder also began breeding plants, focusing on Hamamelis, Hydrangea and Rhododendron and trees of the genera Malus and Prunus. The couple experimented with Hydrangea paniculata, creating cultivars, including Brussels Lace, Burgundy Lace, Green Spire, Little Lamb, Pink Diamond, The Swan, Unique and "White Moth" among others, as well as Spreading Beauty from Hydrangea serrata. Typically gardens feature only one witch hazel, as the plant requires a large growing space. De Belder, propagated forty varieties at Kalmthout. One of the seedlings named after their daughter Diane, received the Award of Garden Merit in 1993 from the Royal Horticultural Society for its intense red color.

During an economic decline fueled by the oil crisis, Robert's diamond business suffered in the 1980s, and the couple turned the arboretum over to the Province of Antwerp. They relocated to their second estate at Hemelrijk and de Belder continued to propagate ornamental plants. She was the author of a cookbook, Okus po cvetju: kulinarično popotovanje (Ljubljana: DZS, 1994 [A taste for flowers: a culinary journey]) and Life Begins in Autumn (1998). De Belder made a series of documentaries which were broadcast in Slovenia on the national Radiotelevizija Slovenija. These included List in cvet (Leaf and Flower, 1994), Okus po cvetju (Taste of Flowers, 1998) and Okus po plodovih (Taste of Fruit, 2003). After Robert's death in 1995, de Belder was elevated to a Baroness by Albert II of Belgium for her contributions to dendrology. In 1998, she served as the vice president of the Royal Horticulture Society.

== Death and legacy ==
De Belder died while vacationing on the island of Krk on 31 August 2003 In 2011, in commemoration of the 20th anniversary of Slovenian independence, the government of Slovenia planted a linden tree in the Arboretum Kalmthout in honor of de Belder.
