= Kalmthout Heath =

Coordinates: 51.3953°N 4.4411°E

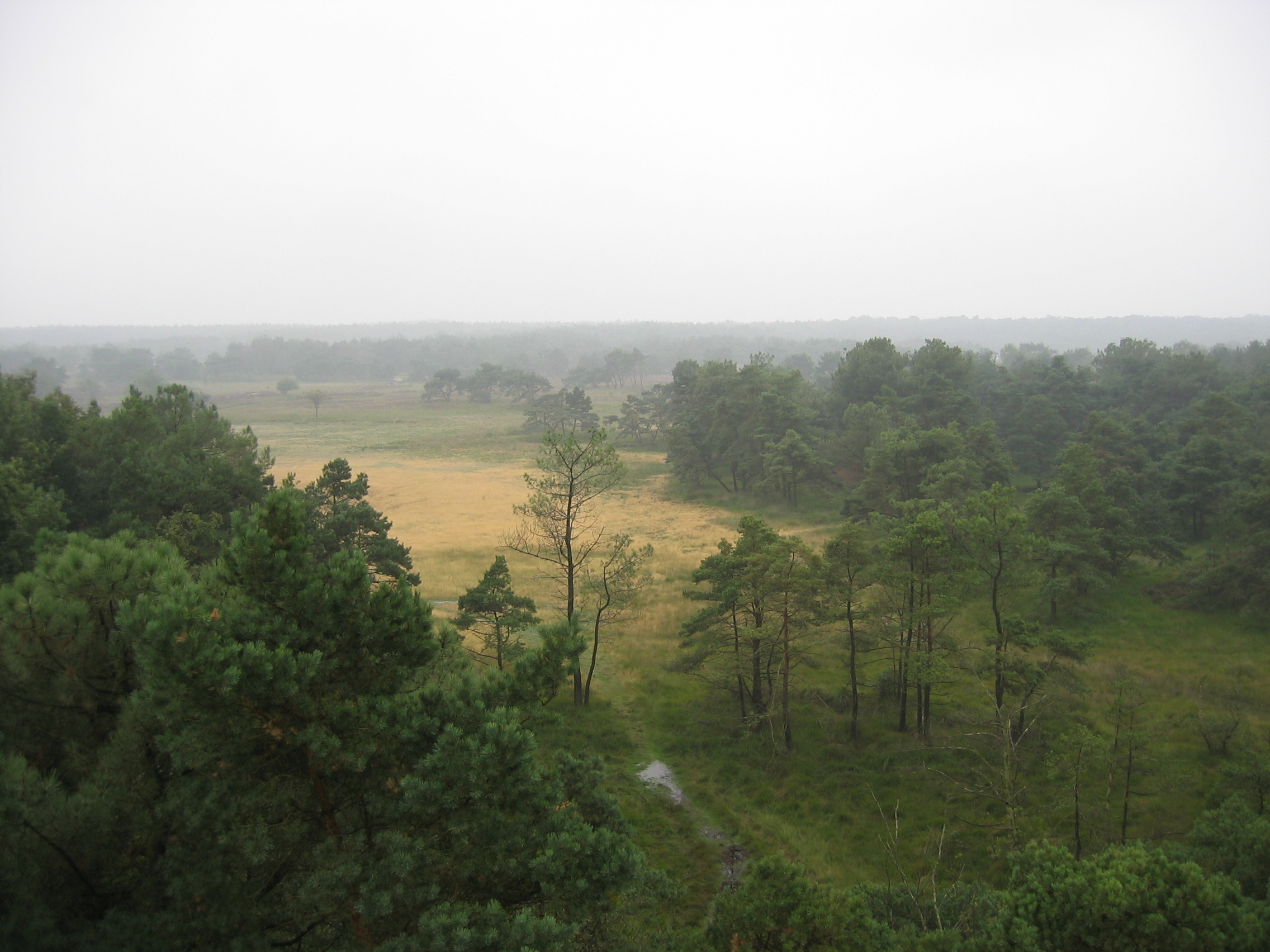
View of the Kalmthout Heath from the top of its watchtower, on 11 September 2005.

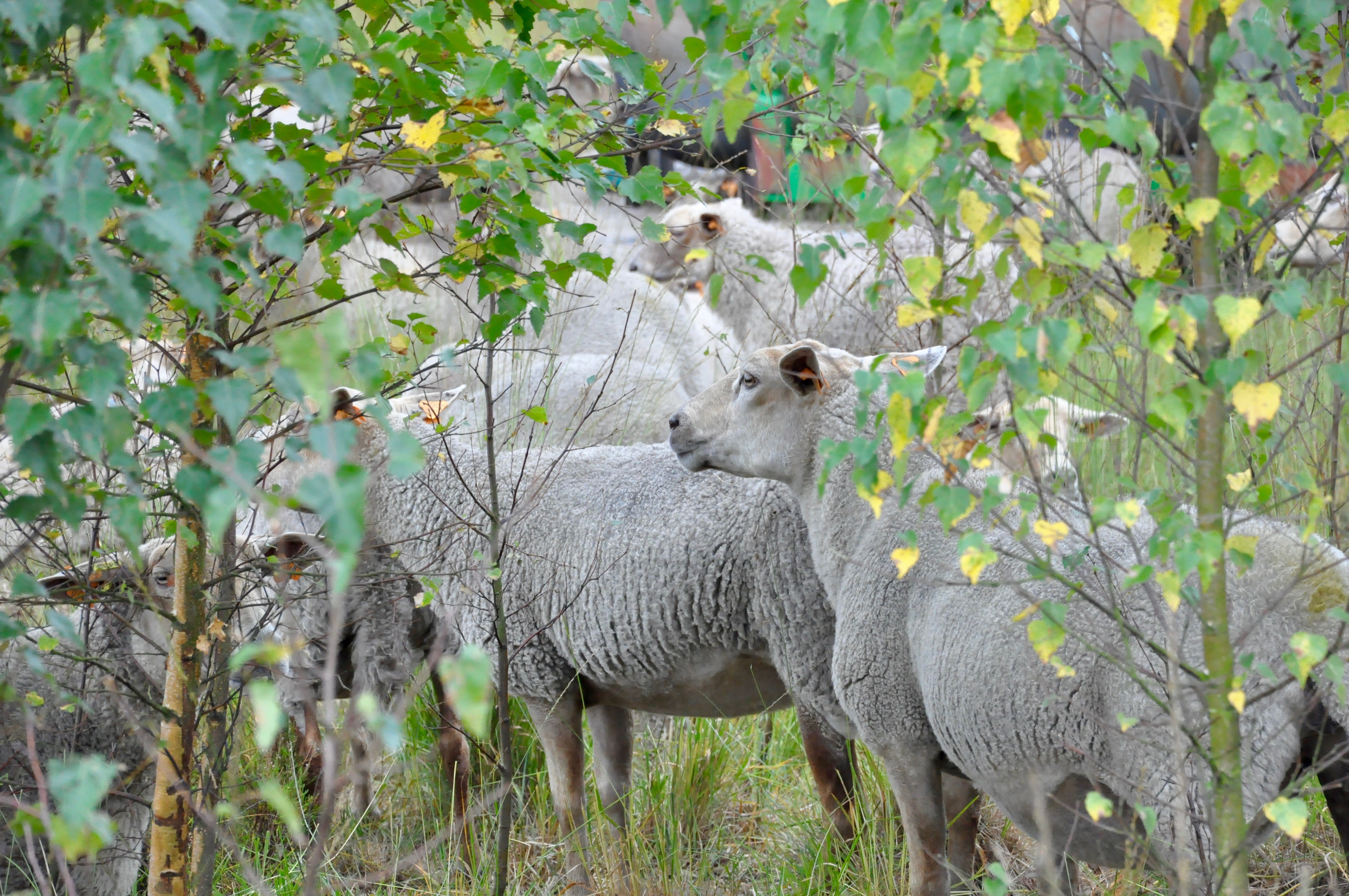
Marked and numbered sheep within a fenced area of the Kalmthout Heath, on 11 September 2016.

The Kalmthout Heath (Dutch: Kalmthoutse Heide) is one of the oldest and largest nature reserves of Flanders, bordering the Netherlands and part of the Dutch-Belgian cross-border park De Zoom – Kalmthoutse Heide. It used to be part of a vastly larger European heath landscape. Its name stems from its location: the Belgian municipality Kalmthout.

It has been protected as a landscape since 1941, and officially became a state reserve (Dutch: staatsreservaat) in 1964 due to a petition of over 100,000 signatures.

== Geography ==
The heath is an infiltration area located in a cover sand region, in the north of the province of Antwerp. Its relief consists mainly of clay sediments from the Early Pleistocene Kempen Formation. Dunes formed during the Preboreal and the Boreal epochs. At least some of the heath's larger dune systems were still active up until at least the 1990s. In these dune systems, dune-forms (featuring dry podzols or undifferentiated soils) such as parabolic dunes and longitudinal dunes alternate with vast deflation planes (featuring wet podzols) with multiple moorland pools. All of the soils are sandy, transported by saltation. Its water is low in minerals and profoundly acid.

== Visitor centre "De Vroente" ==
"De Vroente" is a NME-centre (Dutch: Vlaams Kennis- en Vormingscentrum voor Natuur & Milieu) of the Flemish Government located at the main entrance of the Kalmthout Heath, and is the main visitor centre for the cross-border park "De Zoom – Kalmthoutse Heide" which spans six thousand hectares. The centre also features nature exhibitions.

== The Steertse Heath ==
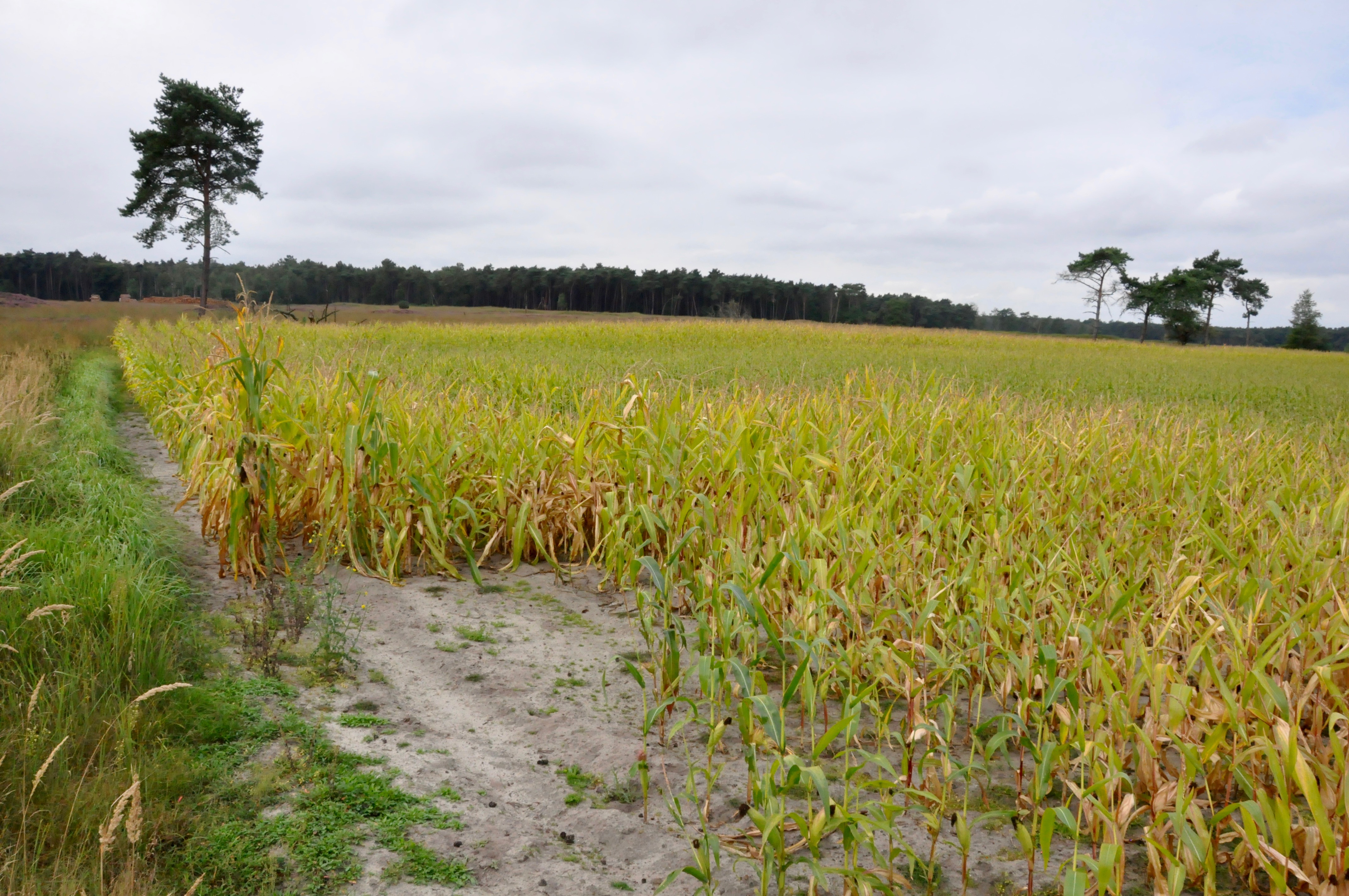
Corn field in "The Steertse Heath", amidst the Kalmthout Heath, on 11 September 2016

Because of the desiccation and dramatic reduction of biodiversity in "De Groote Meer" in Ossendrecht; in 2015, seven nature organisations advocated for buying lands of the agriculture enclave "The Steertse Heath" located on the Belgian territory of the Kalmthout Heath.

== See also ==
- De Zoom – Kalmthoutse Heide
