= Joseph Barondess =

American labor leader

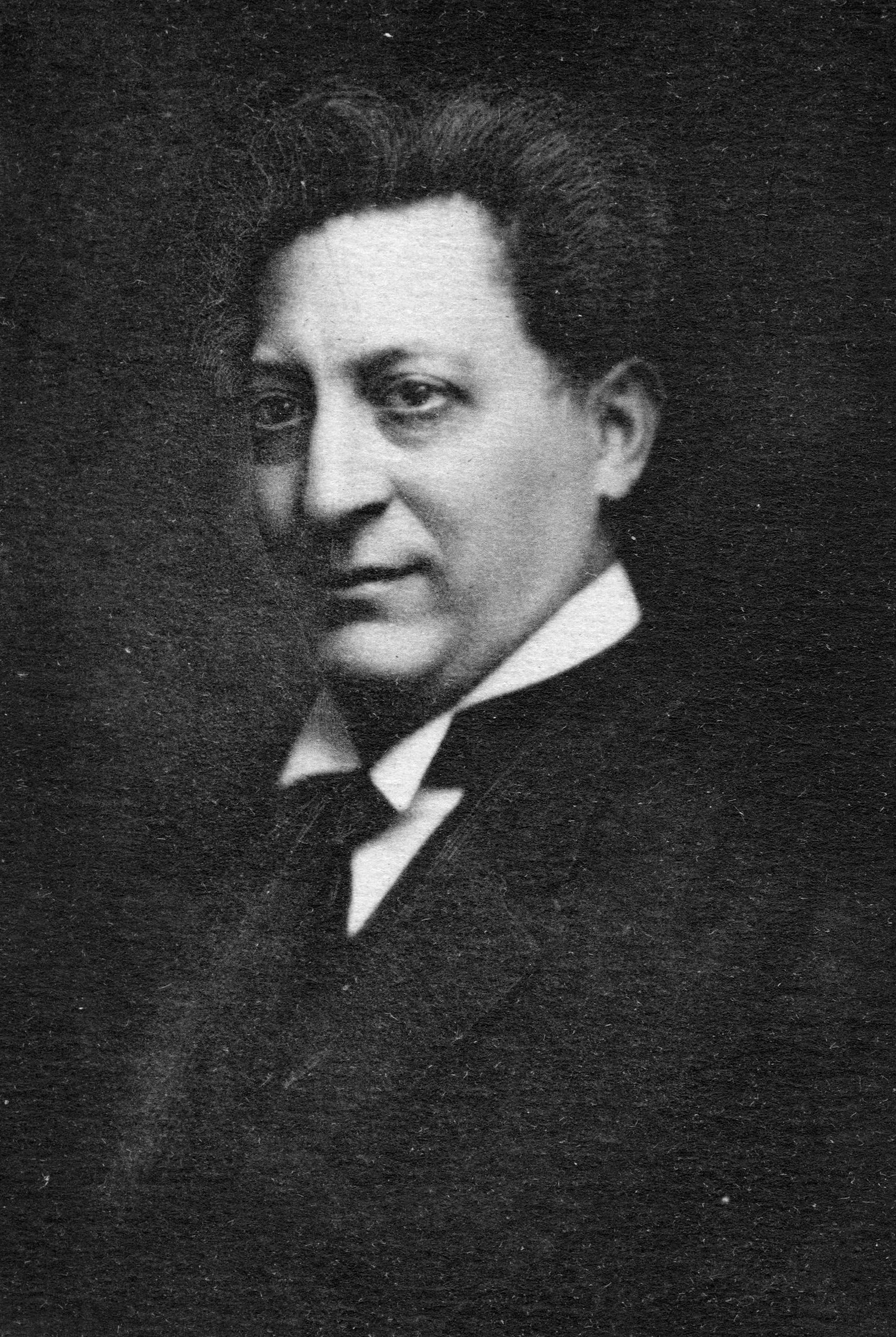
- Born: July 3, 1867; Bar, Podolia Governorate, Russian Empire
- Died: June 19, 1928 (aged 60); New York City, U.S.
- Education: New York University
- Occupation: Labor leader

Joseph Barondess (July 3, 1867 – June 19, 1928) was an American labor leader and political figure in New York City's Lower East Side Jewish community in the late nineteenth century and early twentieth century. Known as the "King of the Cloakmakers", whose union he led, he carried himself like an actor, a career he had tried but failed at before he became a garment worker and union leader. In his heyday he was in great demand at public celebrations of all sorts; as one observer of the time noted, "It was almost a pleasure to die, knowing that Barondess would arrange the rites."

== Biography ==
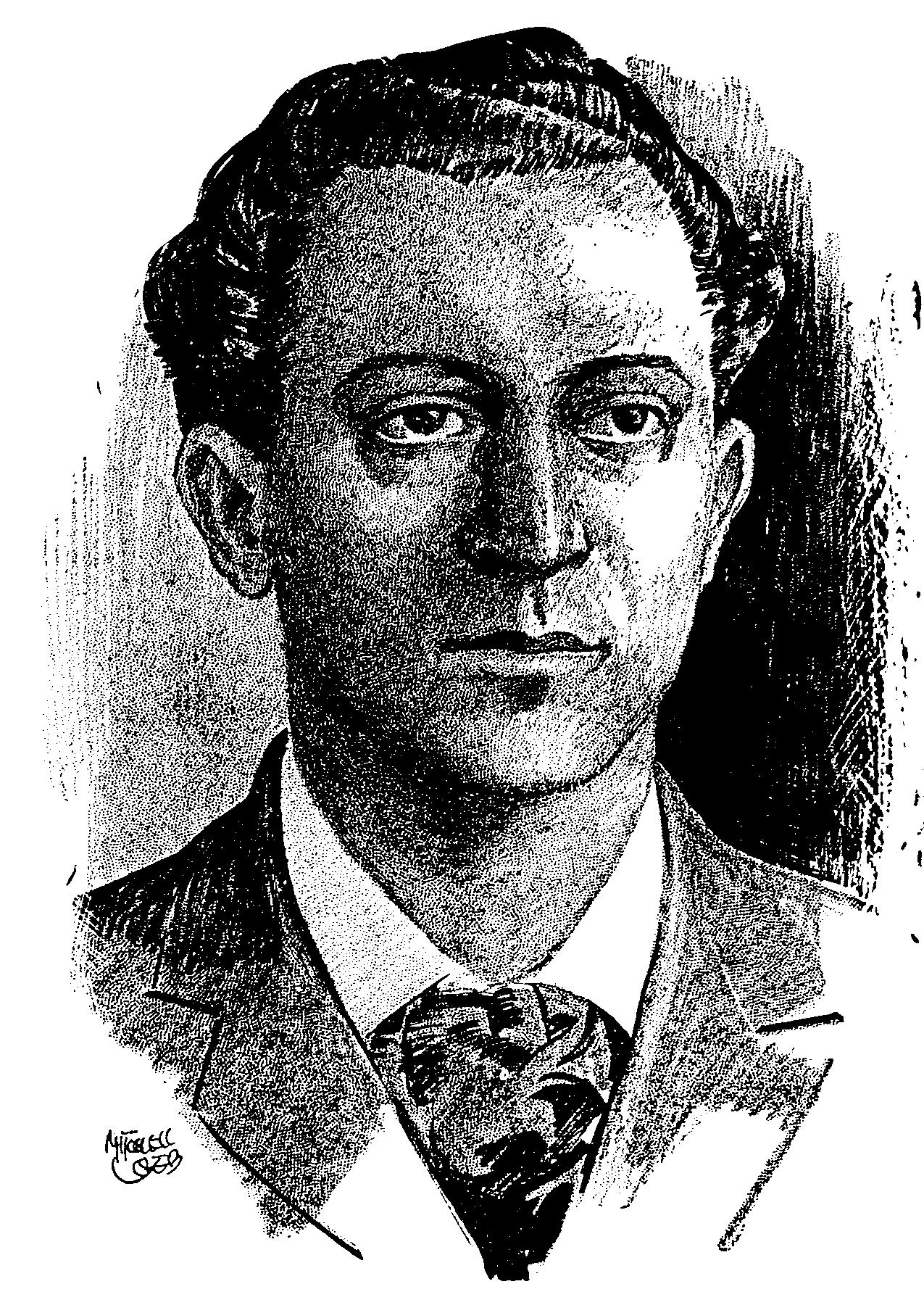
Illustration of Barondess

Barondess was born in Bar, Russian Empire between Vinnytsia and Kamianets-Podilskyi in Ukraine (former Russia). He was a son of Rabbi Judah Samuel Barondess. He was a relative of Supreme Court Justice Louis Brandeis Joseph Barondess may have spent time in Medzhibozh or perhaps he felt affiliated with the town because his wife came from there. Regardless, he was a lifelong member of the Medzhibozh landsmanshaftn society and helped support various members. He immigrated to England in 1885, where he met his wife, Anna Zifels, and came to the United States in 1888. After trying out with the Romanian Opera Company in New York, he went to work in the garment trade. Three years later Barondess helped found the Cloakmakers' Union. He also studied law for a time at New York University, but never finished his studies.

Barondess feuded with the Socialist Labor Party, which criticized him relentlessly. He formed a brief alliance with anarchists in the labor movement, but fell out with them as well. He eventually forged warmer relations with those socialists who left the SLP to form the Socialist Party.

His star faded somewhat after his conviction for extortion in connection with a cloakmakers' strike in 1891, in which he was accused of accepting a check for one hundred dollars from an employer who had violated his collective bargaining agreement with the union. The accusation was probably false; the union did not have its own checking account at the time, so any payment would have had to go through the account of an individual who did. After being convicted, Barondess jumped bail to flee to Canada, returning to serve a shortened sentence only after union leaders pleaded for him to do so.

He eventually recovered his former popularity, however, presiding at the conference at which the International Ladies' Garment Workers' Union was founded in 1900, helping to organize the Hebrew Actors' Union (1899; this union of actors from the Yiddish theater was the country's first performing arts union), running unsuccessfully for Congress as a Socialist in 1904 (though he earned 21% of the vote), later becoming a Zionist, then serving on New York City's Board of Education in 1911. He counted among his friends Woodrow Wilson, having close ties with him long before he became president.

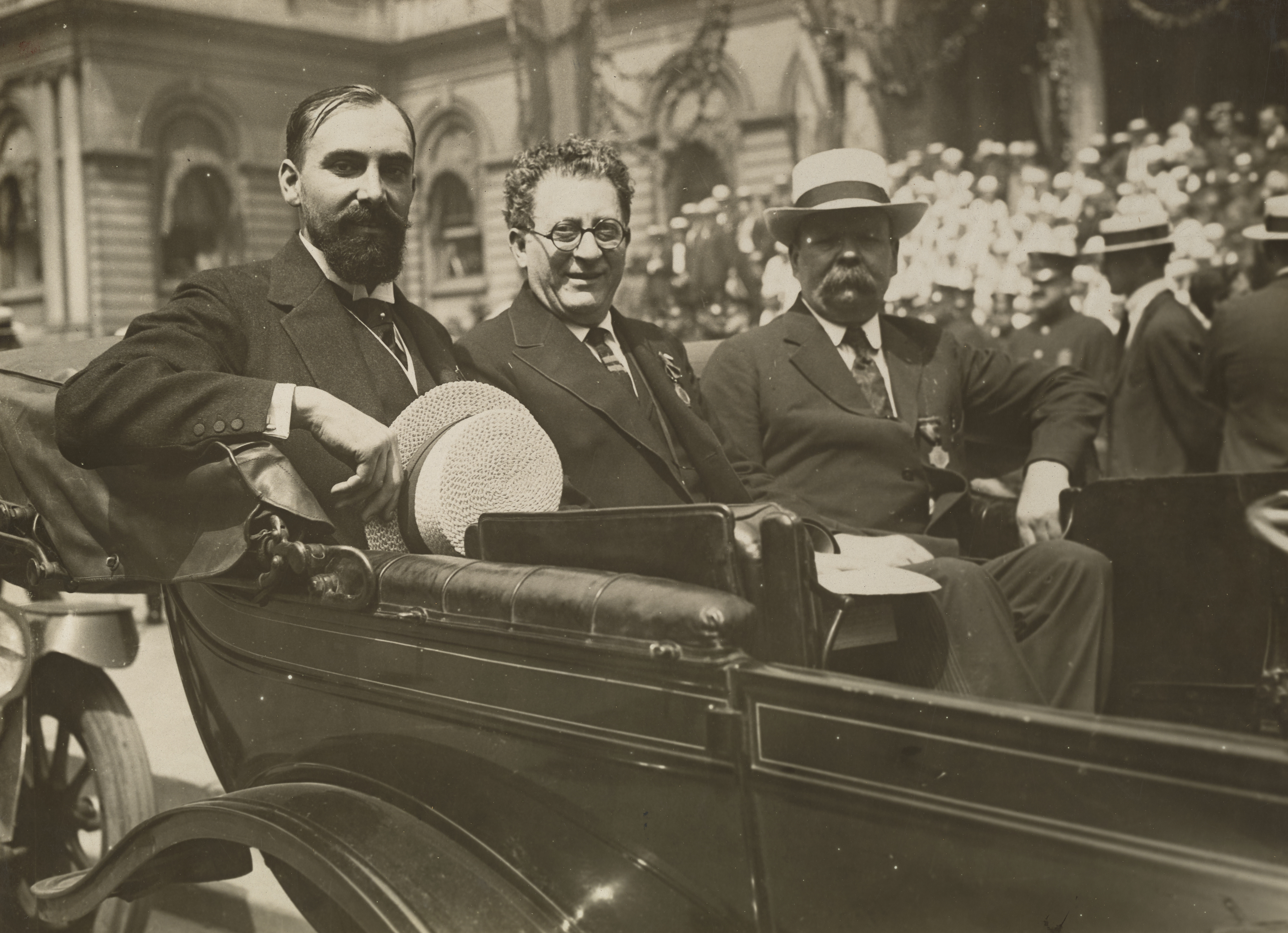
Barondess (center) and New York City Coroner Timothy Healy (right) welcome Hector Carlier of the Belgian Mission to New York City, June 16, 1917

Barondess was one of the founders of the American Jewish Congress, and in 1919 he participated in the AJC's delegation to the Paris Peace Conference leading to the Treaty of Versailles. He became active in Jewish relief efforts in the wake of pogroms in the Ukrainian civil war of 1919–1921.

Even when he held no particular office later in his life, Barondess served as the advocate for whoever sought his help, whether petitioning for small favors or protesting mistreatment by the authorities. Even though English was his second language (Yiddish was his first), he was a brilliant orator and elegant writer. In his later years his calendar was full with speaking engagements.

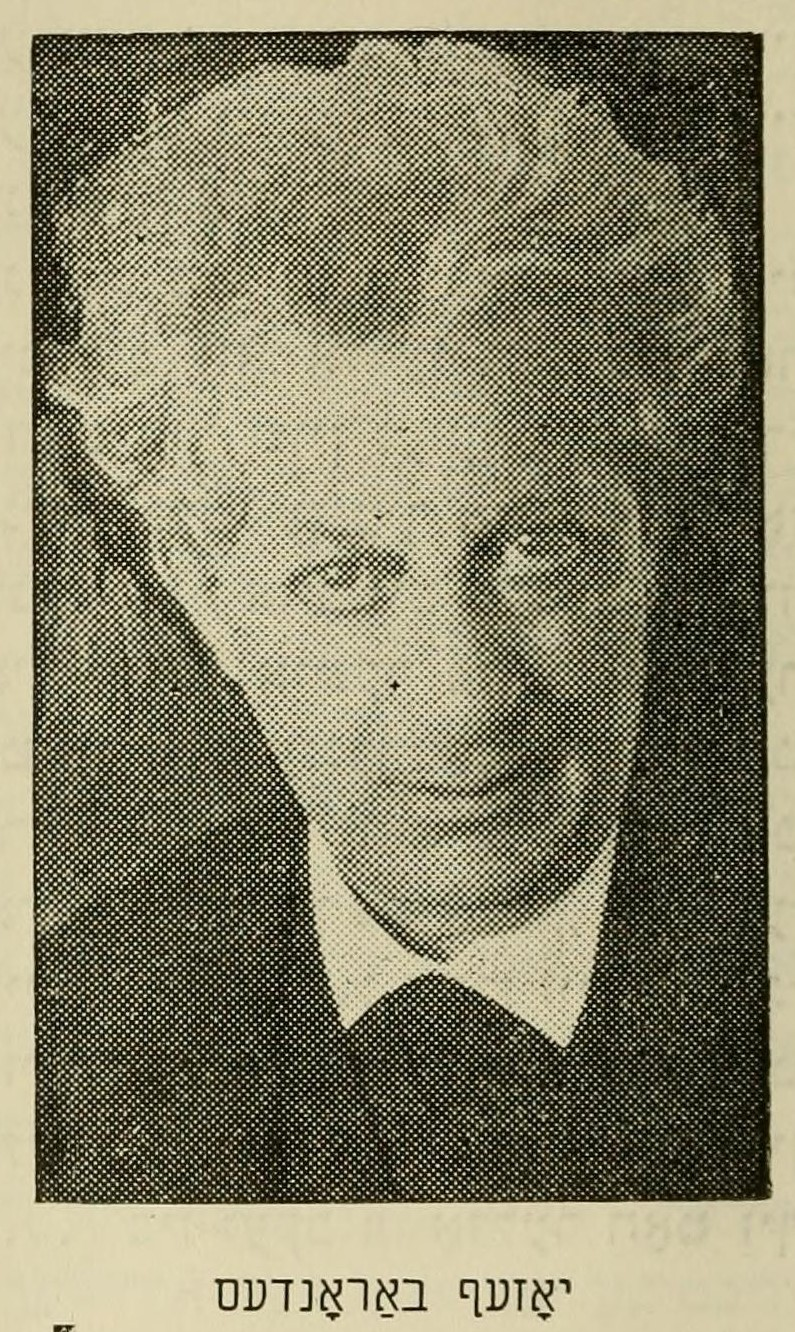
Barondess later in life

By the time of his death in 1928, however, he no longer had any active role in either the labor movement or politics. He died at Mount Sinai Hospital in New York following two operations for kidney trouble. He was remembered fondly as a pioneer in the union movement and for his gifted speaking and writing skills; even the Communist paper Freiheit gave him a respectful obituary. One of the mourners in attendance at his funeral reportedly stated that it would have been a more impressive service if Barondess had been there to deliver the eulogy.

== Sources ==
- Howe, Irving, World of Our Fathers, New York: Harcourt Brace Jovanovich, 1976. ISBN 0-15-146353-0.
- Epstein, Melech, Profiles of eleven; profiles of eleven men who guided the destiny of an immigrant society and stimulated social consciousness among the American people, Detroit: Wayne State University Press, 1965.
- Chapin, David A. and Weinstock, Ben, The Road from Letichev: The history and culture of a forgotten Jewish community in Eastern Europe, Volume 2. ISBN 0-595-00667-1 iUniverse, Lincoln, NE, 2000, p. 538-545.
- American Jewish Archives, Cincinnati, microfilms 2004-2019, contain Barondess' correspondence files.
