= Arboretum Kalmthout =

Arboretum in Kalmthout, Antwerp, Belgium

Coordinates: 51°23′35″N 4°27′47″E

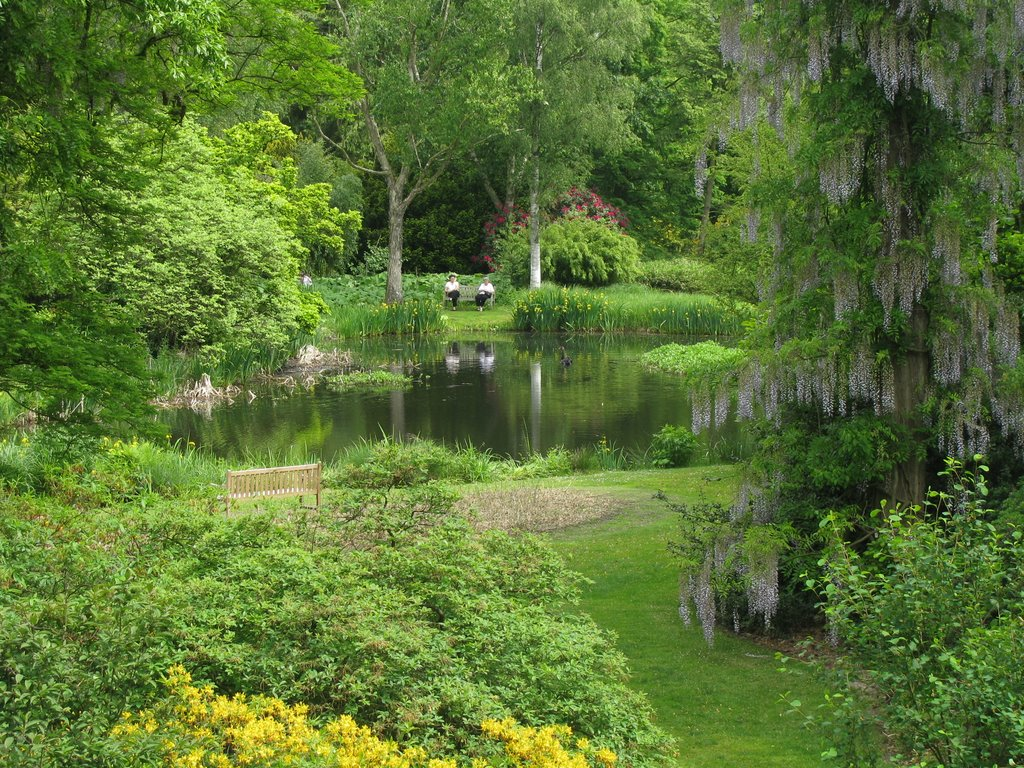
The arboretum in May 2009

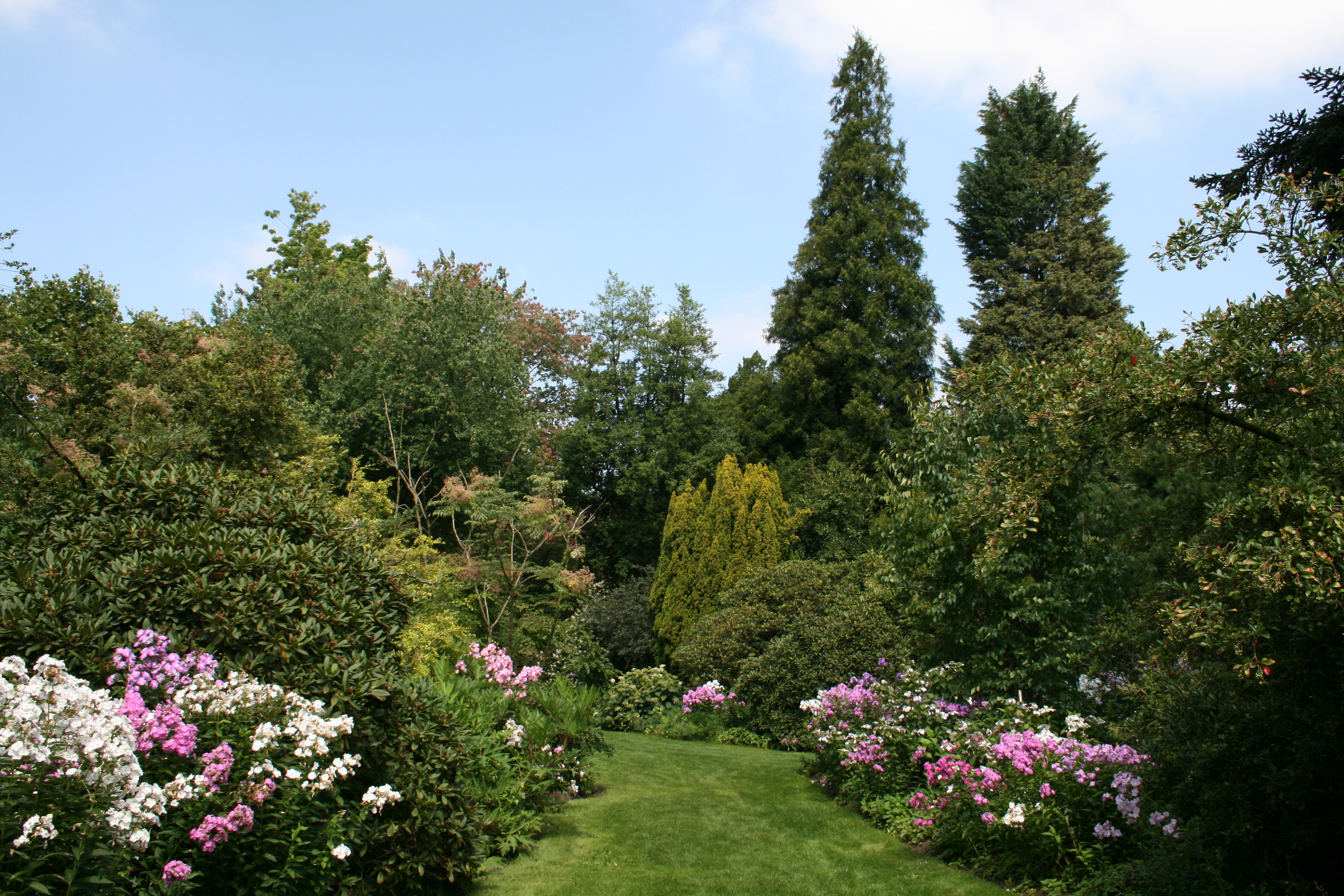
The arboretum in August 2011

The Arboretum Kalmthout is a botanical garden in Kalmthout, Belgium. It was started as a tree plantation by Charles Van Geert in 1856. Van Geert developed a collection of rare plants and trees before selling the property after 40 years to Antoine Kort. Kort added an extensive collection of Hamamelis or witch hazel to the nursery, but was forced to close his business due to the Great Depression of the 1930s. In 1952, the property was purchased by the brothers Georges and Robert de Belder, to save it from being destroyed by a housing development. At the site, the year that they purchased the property, the de Belder brothers founded the International Dendrology Society (IDS) to promote preservation and conservation of rare or endangered woody plants. Robert de Belder and his wife, Jelena de Belder-Kovačič worked together to build an internationally known arboretum, where plant enthusiasts could study and exchange knowledge and information about plants. In 1986 it became property of the Antwerp province and is now open to the public.

== See also ==
- National Botanic Garden of Belgium
