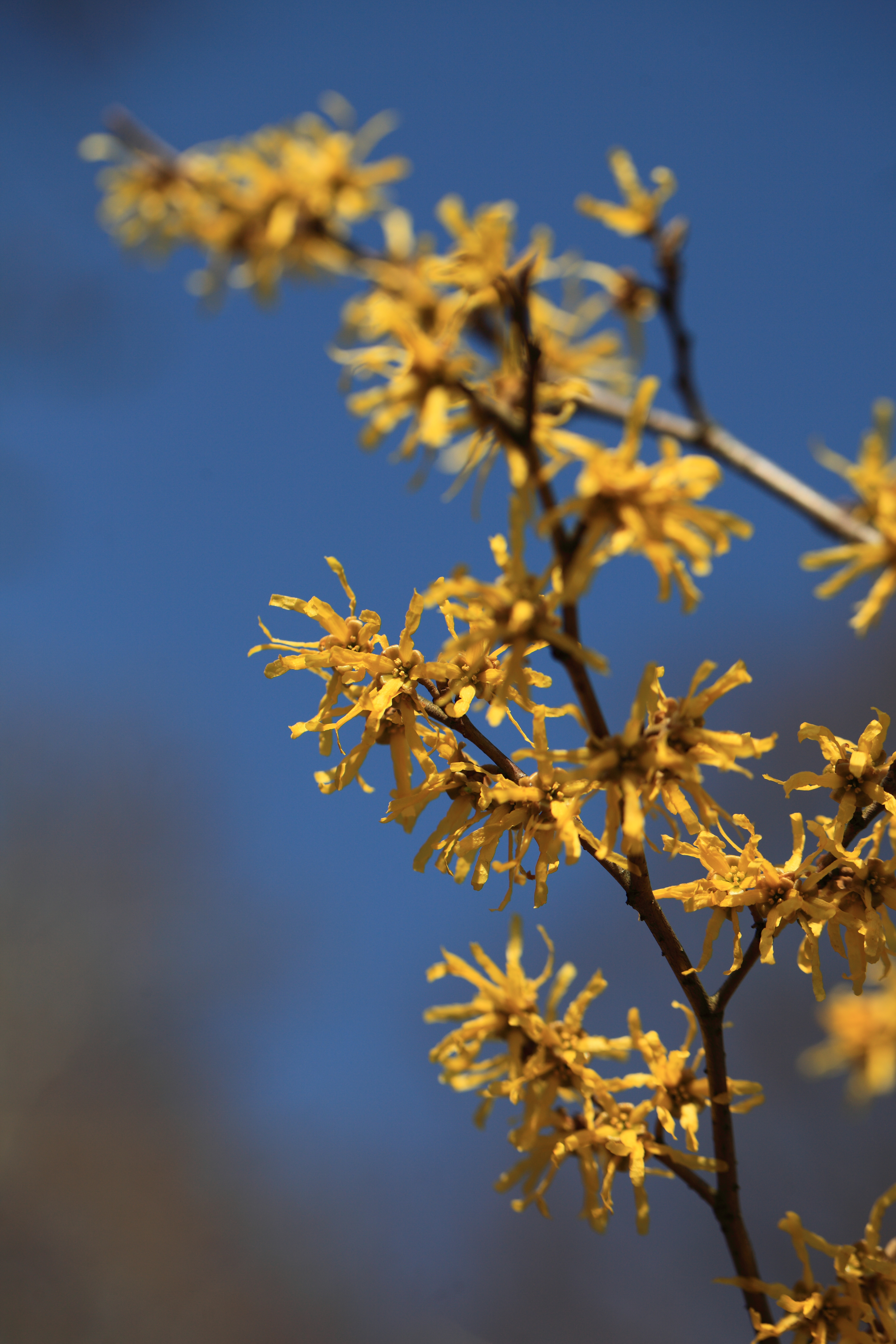

Scientific classification
- Kingdom: Plantae
- Clade: Tracheophytes
- Clade: Angiosperms
- Clade: Eudicots
- Order: Saxifragales
- Family: Hamamelidaceae
- Genus: Hamamelis
- Species: H. japonica

Binomial name
- Hamamelis japonica Siebold & Zucc.

= Hamamelis japonica =

Species of tree

Hamamelis japonica, Japanese witch-hazel, is a species of flowering plant in the family Hamamelidaceae, native to Japan but widely cultivated in temperate situations elsewhere. A horizontally spreading, hardy deciduous shrub or small tree, it is notable for the slightly fragrant yellow blooms which clothe its naked branches in the depths of winter through to early spring (usually in January and February). The green leaves follow, and in favourable locations they turn yellow before dropping in autumn.

H. japonica is one parent of the hybrid Hamamelis × intermedia, an extremely popular and widespread award-winning garden shrub, whose other parent is Hamamelis mollis.

Cultivars:

- 'Zuccariniana'

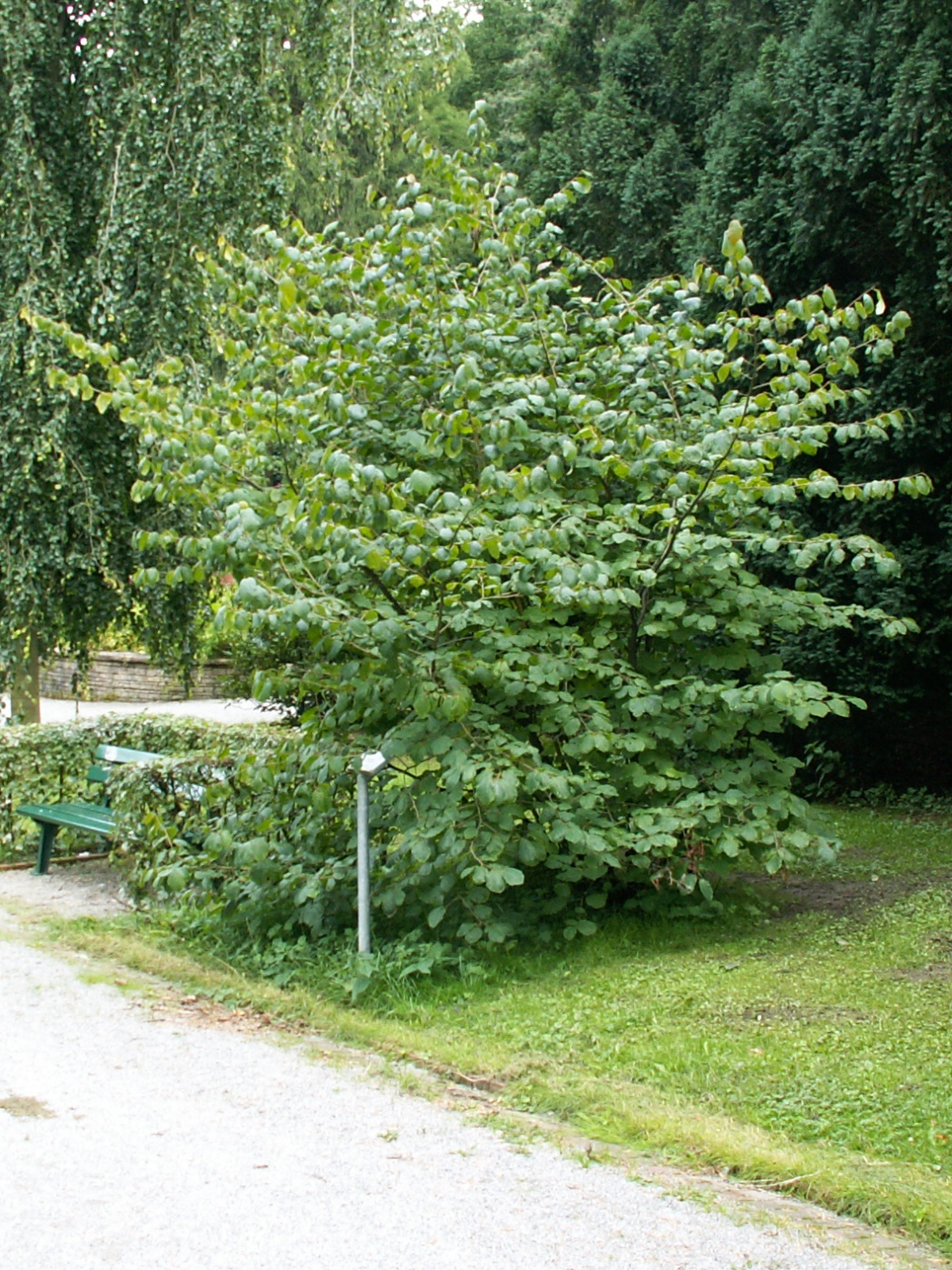
Shrub in summer
