= De Zoom–Kalmthoutse Heide Cross-Border Park =

- Grenspark De Zoom - Kalmthoutse Heide
- IUCN category II (national park)
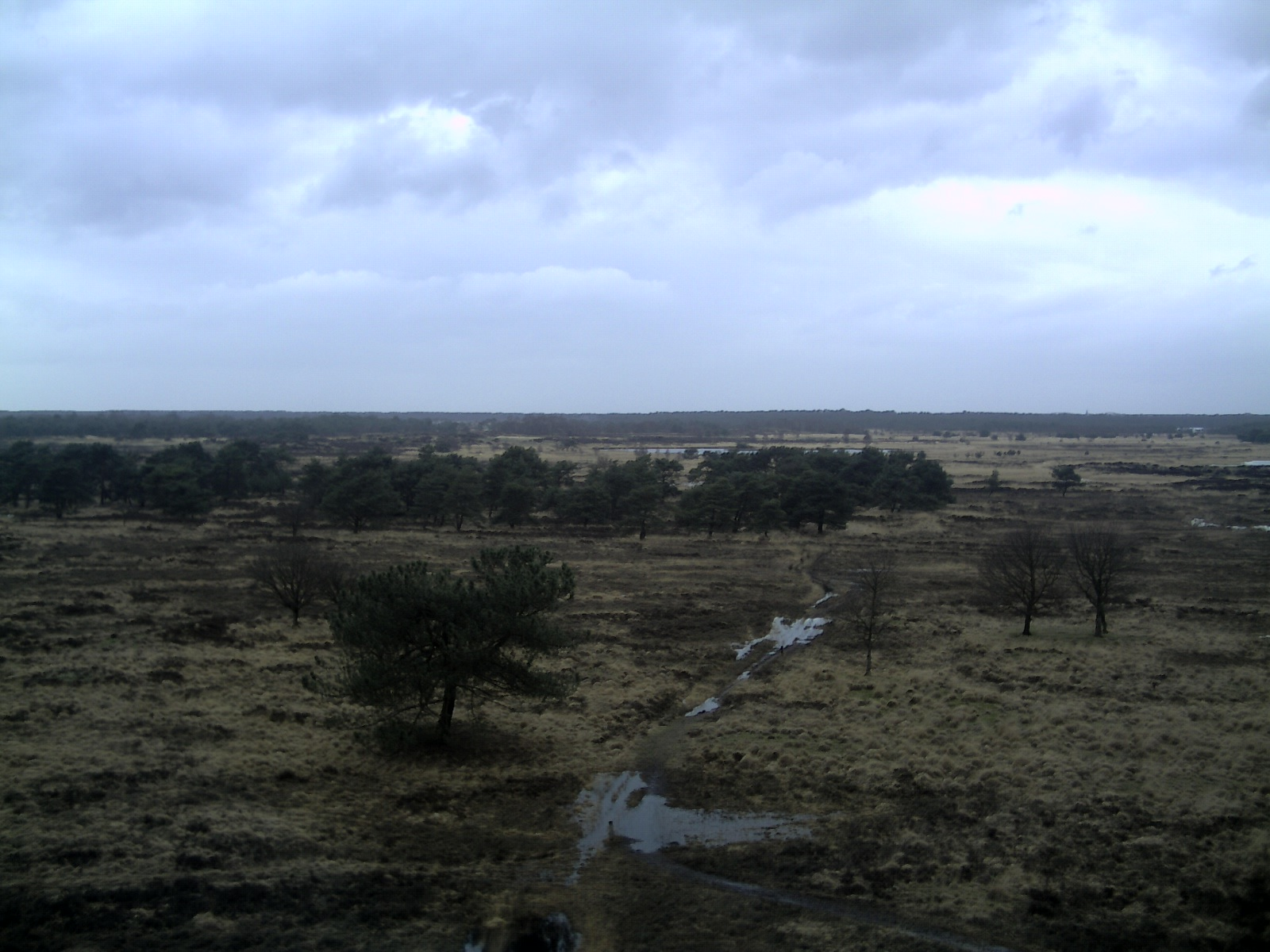

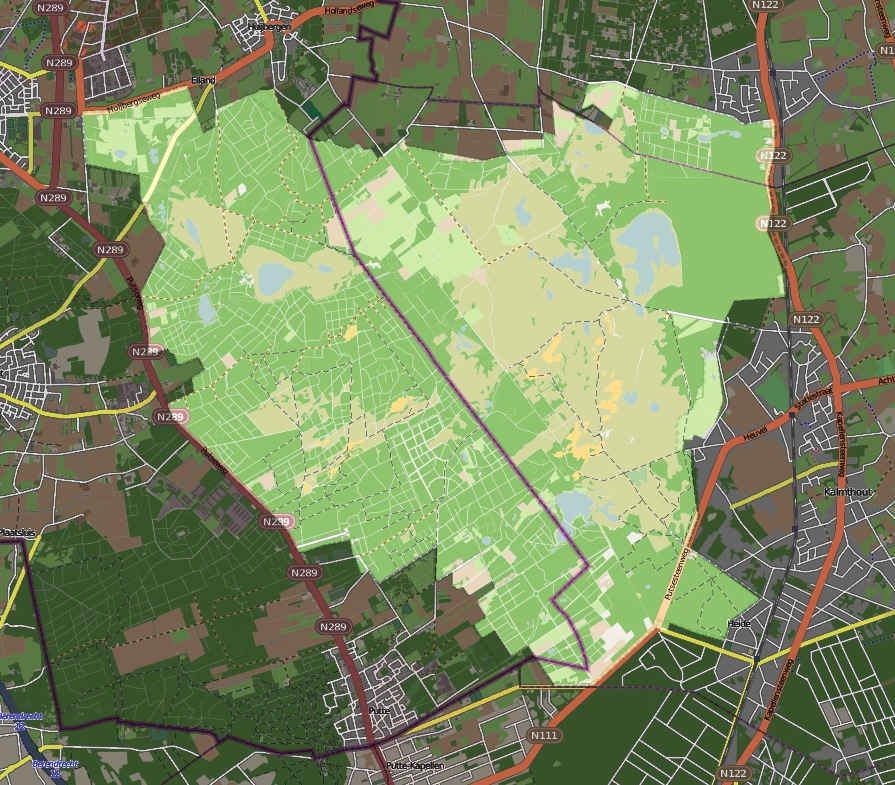
- Map of the National Park
- Location: North Brabant, Netherlands and Antwerp, Belgium
- Coordinates: 51°23′43″N 4°26′28″E
- Area: 37.5 km^{2} (14.5 sq mi)
- Established: 2001
- Governing body: Bijzondere Commissie "Grenspark De Zoom-Kalmthoutse Heide"
- Website: www.grensparkzk.nl

Ramsar Wetland
- Official name: Kalmthoutse Heide
- Designated: 4 March 1986
- Reference no.: 330

De Zoom–Kalmthoutse Heide Cross-Border Park is a cross-border park on the Belgian–Dutch border. It is a merger of two former parks, the Kalmthoutse Heide (Kalmthout Heath) in Belgium and De Zoom in the Netherlands, together extending over 37.50 square kilometres (14.48 sq mi). A very large part of the park is covered with heath.

The park is managed by a special commission in which both Flemish and Dutch organisations are represented. The park is owned by the state of Flanders, the municipality Kalmthout, Staatsbosbeheer, Natuurmonumenten and several private owners. The best known part of the border park lies in Belgium, in the north of the province of Antwerp (Kalmthout and Essen). The Dutch part lies in the municipality Woensdrecht (province North Brabant) and stretches from the border to the villages Huijbergen and Putte.

== History ==
Originally, the area was covered with the deciduous forests typical of Central Europe. However, centuries of using the area as grazing land for cattle and sheep led to a significant decline in vegetation and the emergence of extensive heathland. The removal of sods practiced in the Middle Ages, which were used together with the excrement of the cattle as fertilizer for the surrounding fields, led to further removal of nutrients from the soil. Furthermore, from the 13th century, people began to drain the local bogs to extract peat for fuel. From the 1850s, people began to either reforest the heathlands in the Antwerp region with conifers or convert them to farmland. As one of the last larger heath areas, the Belgian part of today's park was declared a landscape protection area as early as 1941. The area has been part of the Ramsar Convention for the Protection of Important Wetlands since 1986. On 17 October 1988, the Flemish part was designated a bird sanctuary (Dutch Vogelrichtlijngebied), the Dutch part followed a few years later.

Shortly before the turn of the millennium, considerations arose of combining the nature reserves on both sides of the border into a single, coherent reserve. In 2001, these led to the establishment of the border park De Zoom – Kalmthoutse Heide with a total area of around 4,000 hectares. The Dutch part received the official status of a national park in the same year. A decade later, the park's area was expanded by another 2,000 hectares to its current size.
