= Aloys Van de Vyvere =

Belgian politician (1871–1961)

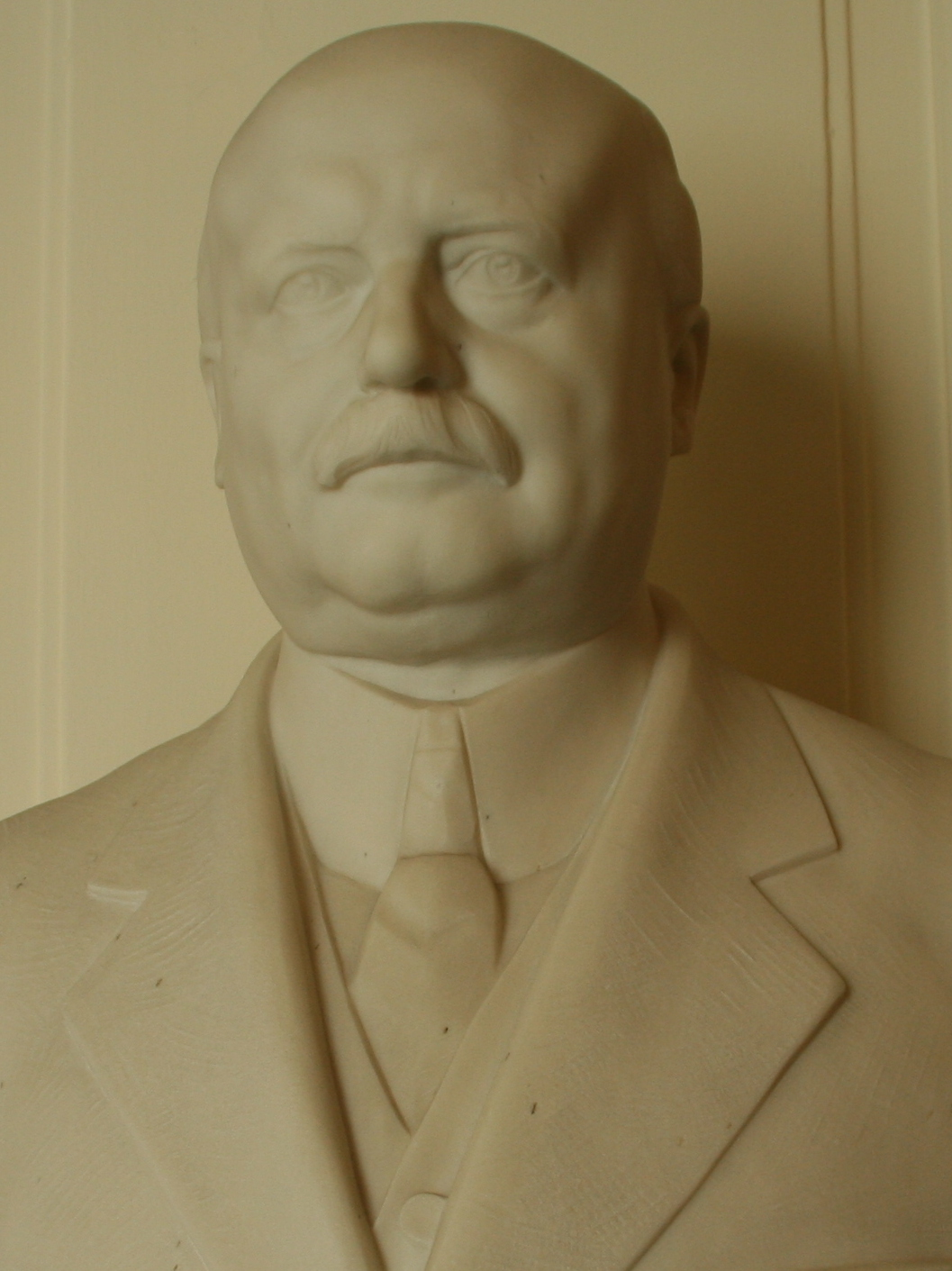
- Van de Vyvere's official portrait bust in the Belgian Federal Parliament

Prime Minister of Belgium
- In office 13 May 1925 – 17 June 1925
- Monarch: Albert I
- Preceded by: Georges Theunis
- Succeeded by: Prosper Poullet

Personal details
- Born: 8 June 1871 Tielt, Belgium
- Died: 22 October 1961 (aged 90) Paris, France
- Party: Catholic Party

Aloys Jean Maria Joseph "Alois", Viscount Van de Vyvere (8 June 1871 – 22 October 1961) was a Belgian Catholic Party politician who briefly served as Prime Minister of Belgium in 1925.

== Biography ==
Born in Tielt, Van de Vyvere studied law and philosophy and worked as a lawyer in Ghent, where he served as a local councillor between 1909 and 1911. In 1911 he was elected to the Belgian Chamber of Representatives for Roeselare and Tielt with the strong support of the Boerenbond (farmers' union). On 25 February 1920, he cofounded the oil company Compagnie Financière Belge des Pétroles (Petrofina), together with Fernand and Hector Carlier.

He held ministerial office regularly in the period from 1911 to 1926, beginning as Agriculture and Public works minister (1911–1912), then moving to Railways and Posts (1912–1914), Finance (1914–1918), Economic affairs (1920–1924), and returning to Agriculture (1925–1926). He was named an honorary minister of State in 1918.

Becoming the prime minister of Belgium in 1925, he presided over a party and cabinet in crisis, and his government fell after only a month.

He left politics in 1926, working in business. He died in Paris in 1961.

== Honours ==
- Belgium: Minister of State, By royal decree.
- Belgium: Grand cordon in the Order of Leopold
- by Royal Decree of 13.11.1919. Grand Officer in the Order of Leopold.
- 1923: Knight Grand Cross in the Order of Saint Gregory the Great, by request of cardinal Mercier.
- Spain: Knight Grand Cross in the Order of Isabella the Catholic
- Netherlands: Knight Grand Cross in the Order of the Netherlands Lion
- Luxemburg: Knight Grand Cross in the Order of the Oak Crown

Political offices
Preceded by Georges Theunis	Prime Minister of Belgium; 1925	Succeeded by Prosper Poullet
