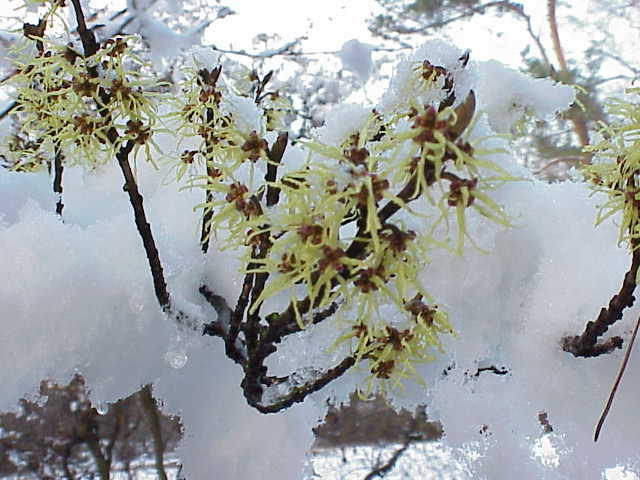
- Flowers

Scientific classification
- Kingdom: Plantae
- Clade: Tracheophytes
- Clade: Angiosperms
- Clade: Eudicots
- Order: Saxifragales
- Family: Hamamelidaceae
- Genus: Hamamelis
- Species: H. mollis

Binomial name
- Hamamelis mollis Oliv.

= Hamamelis mollis =

Species of tree

Chinese name
- Traditional Chinese: 金縷梅
- Simplified Chinese: 金缕梅
- Hanyu Pinyin: jīnlǚméi
- Literal meaning: "golden-thread plum"
Transcriptions
Standard Mandarin
- Hanyu Pinyin: jīnlǚméi
- Bopomofo: ㄐㄧㄣ ㄌㄩˇ ㄇㄟˊ
- Gwoyeu Romatzyh: jinleumei
- Wade–Giles: chin^{1}-lü^{3}-mei^{2}
- Yale Romanization: jīnlyǔméi
- MPS2: jīnliǔméi
- IPA: [tɕín.lỳ.měɪ]
Yue: Cantonese
- Yale Romanization: gāmléuihmùih
- Jyutping: gam1leoi5mui4

Hamamelis mollis, also known as Chinese witch hazel, is a species of flowering plant in the witch hazel family Hamamelidaceae, native to central and eastern China, in Anhui, Guangxi, Hubei, Hunan, Jiangxi, Sichuan, and Zhejiang.

It is a deciduous large shrub or small tree growing to 8 m (26 ft) tall. The leaves are oval, 8–15 cm (3 1/4–6 in) long and 6–10 cm (2 1/4–4 in) broad, oblique at the base, acute or rounded at the apex, with a wavy-toothed or shallowly lobed margin, and a short petiole 6–10 mm long; they are dark green and thinly hairy above, and grey beneath with dense grey hairs. The Latin term mollis means "soft", and refers to the felted leaves, which turn yellow in autumn. The flowers are yellow, often with a red base, with four ribbon-shaped petals 15 mm (0.59 in) long and four short stamens, and grow in clusters; flowering is in late winter to early spring on the bare branches. The fruit is a hard woody capsule 12 mm (0.47 in) long, which splits explosively at the apex at maturity one year after pollination, ejecting the two shiny black seeds from the parent plant.

== Cultivation and uses ==
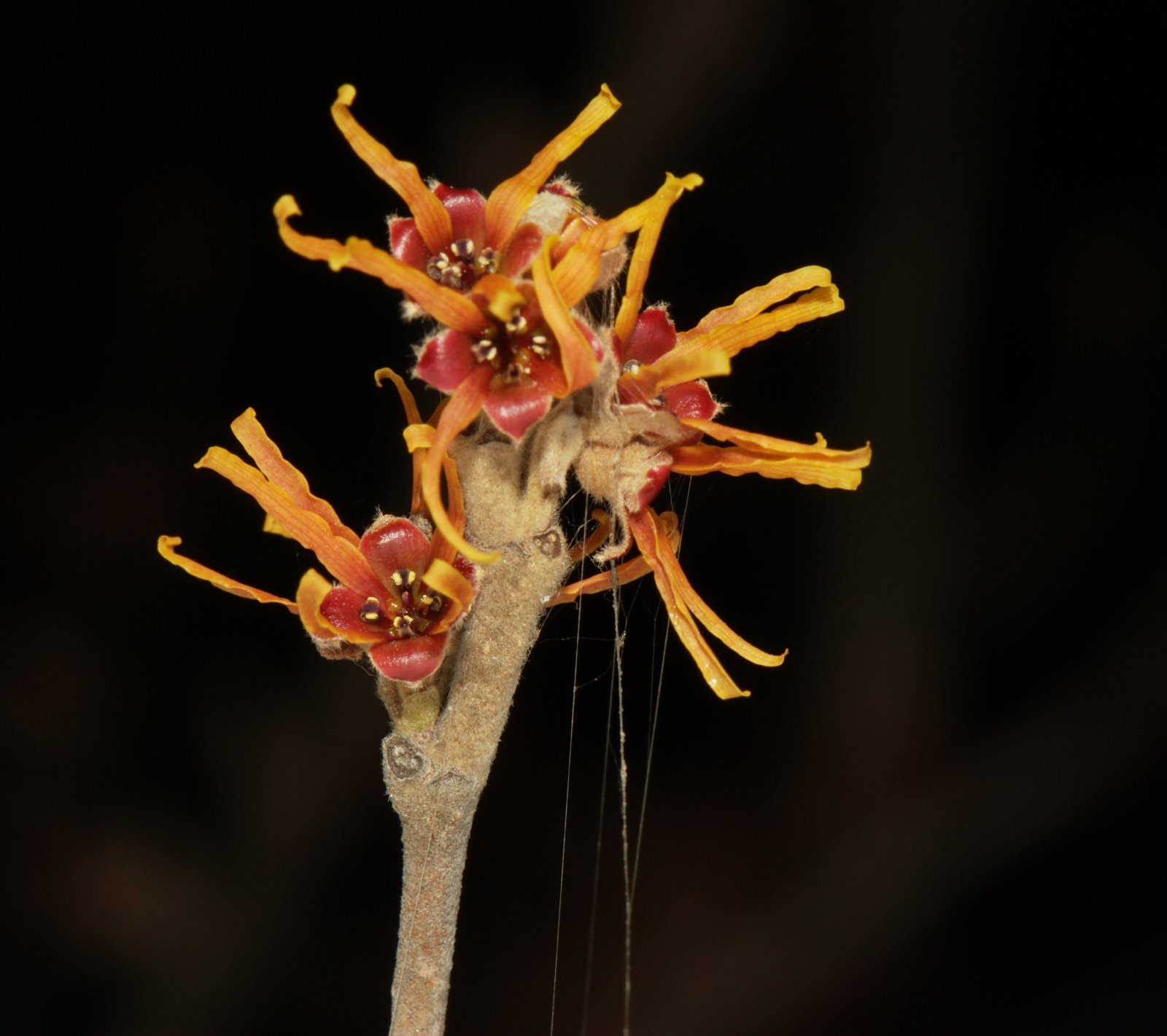
Flowers.

H. mollis is widely grown as an ornamental plant, valued for the strongly-scented flowers appearing in winter when little else is growing. Numerous cultivars have been selected, for variation in flower colour and size, and in shrub size and habit. It is also one of the two parents of the popular garden hybrid H. × intermedia (the other parent is H. japonica).

The cultivars 'Jermyns Gold' and 'Wisley Supreme' have gained the Royal Horticultural Society's Award of Garden Merit.

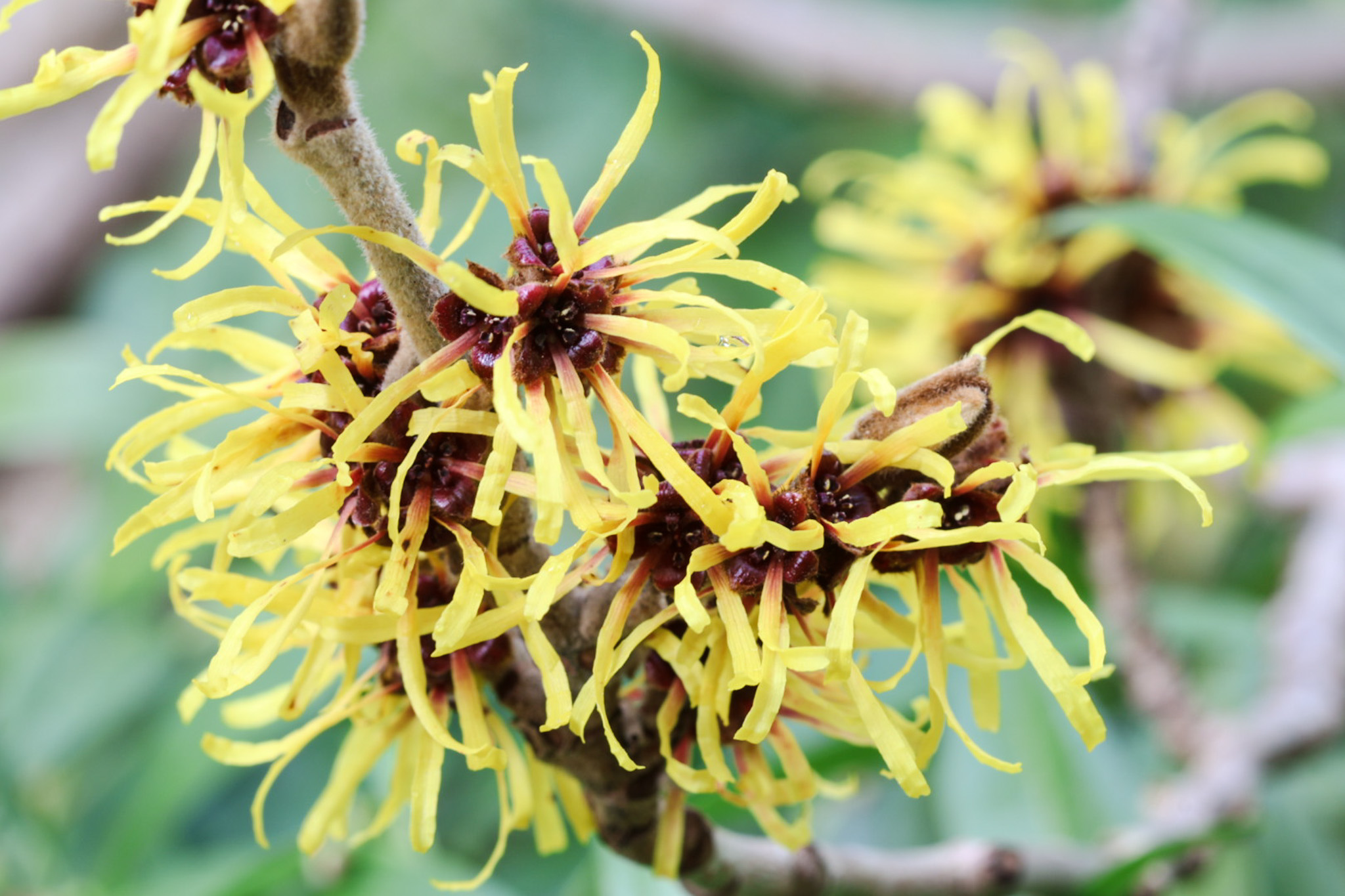
January flowers
