= Hector Carlier =

Belgian banker and industrialist

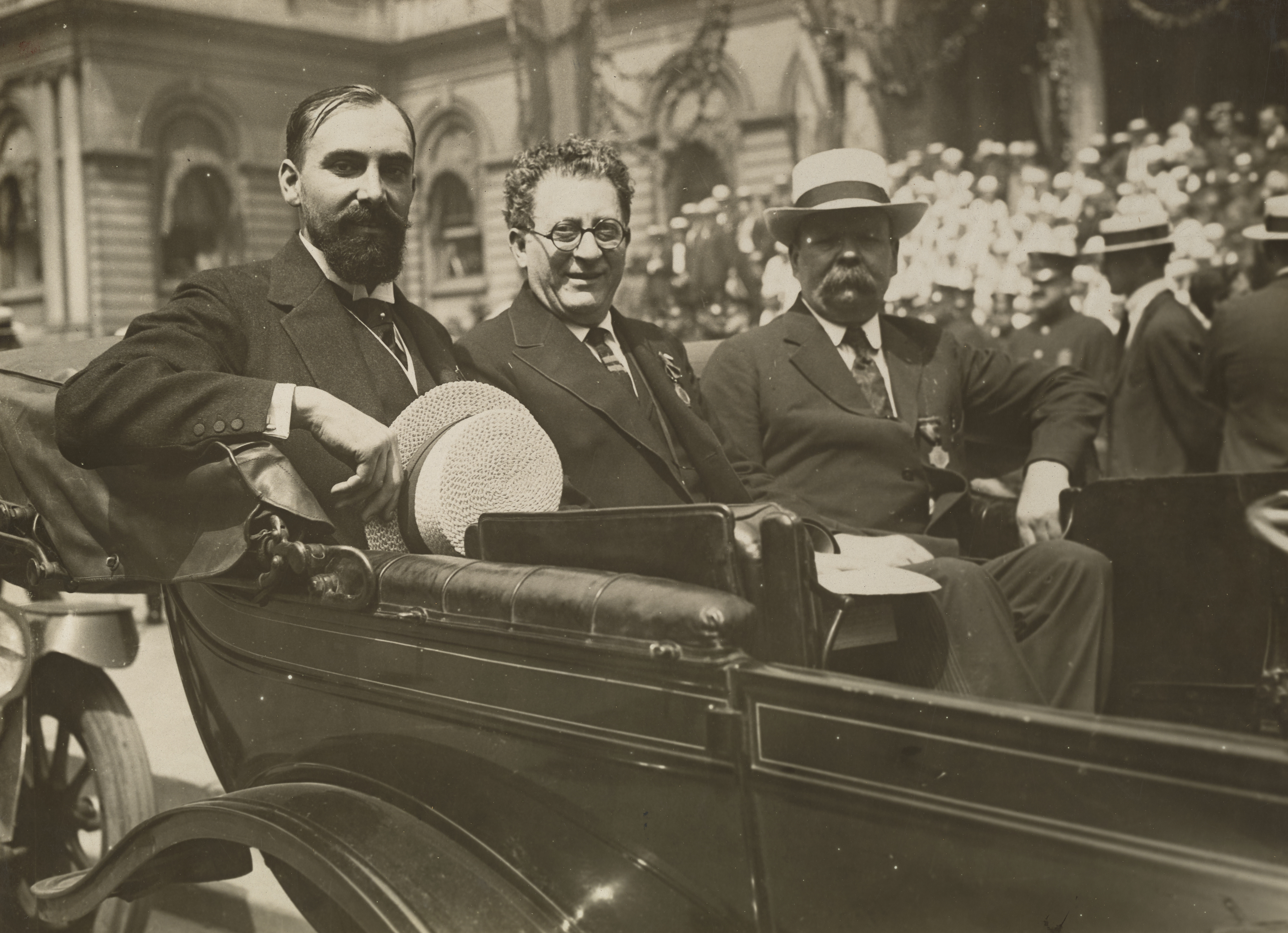
Labor leader Joseph Barondess (center) and New York City Coroner Timothy Healy (right) welcome Carlier of the Belgian Mission to New York City, June 16, 1917

Hector Carlier (11 June 1884 – 1 January 1946 in Kalmthout) was a Belgian banker and industrialist who was the son of banker Jean Baptist Ferdinand Carlier and Marie de Roy. He was married with Amelia Goossens and together they had three children. He is one of the founders of the Belgian oil company Petrofina. Petrofina merged with Total of France to form TotalFina and with Elf Aquitaine in 2000 to form TotalFinaElf. The company's current name is Total S.A.

== Career ==
Hector Carlier started his career at the Banque d'Anvers which his father partly owned, together with the Société Générale de Belgique. On 25 February 1920, he founded the oil company Compagnie Financière Belge des Pétroles, together with his brother Fernand and the Roman Catholic minister Aloys Van de Vyvere. The company got its oil from Romania, after they first had compensated the German claimants on that oil. Their success came to an abrupt end with the outbreak of World War II. The most important refinery of Petrofina in Dunkirk, was devastated during the war. After the war the Carliers were accused of economic collaboration. Hector committed suicide on 1 January 1946 on his Boterberg estate in Kalmthout, and his brother Fernand escaped to Brazil.

== Personal life ==
In 1933 Hector had married the 23 years younger Dutch Amelia Goossens (1907 – 1989) from Woensdrecht, in Dover, Great Britain. Together they had three children, Marie-Antoinette (1934 – 2007), Ferdinand (1935 – 1986) and Amalia (1937 – 2001), who all remained unmarried. The sisters Carlier, after the death of their mother, lived soberly at the Boterberg castle in Kalmthout. When Marie Antoinette died in 2007, she left the entire family fortune to some private heirs and to the King Baudouin Foundation.
