= Kalmthout =

- Municipality
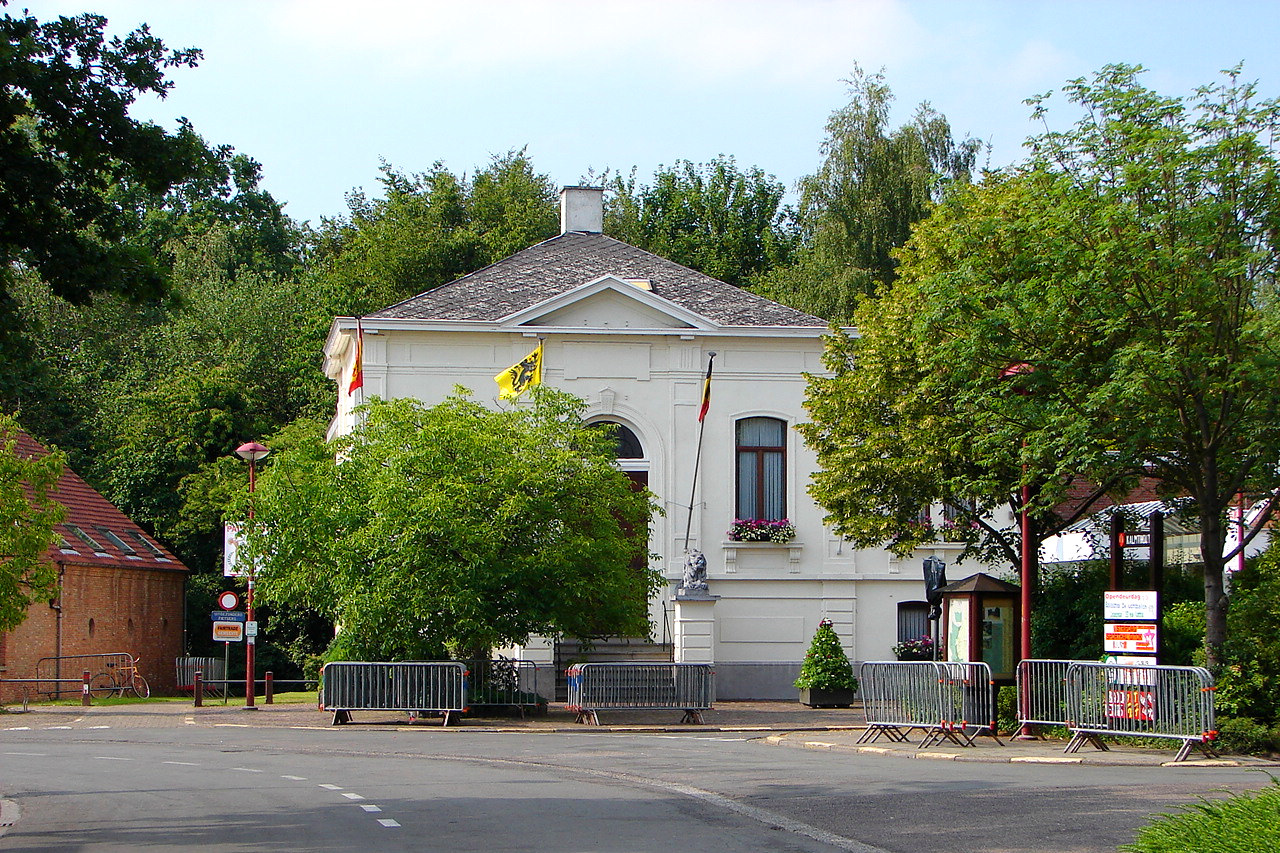
- Town hall

- Flag Coat of arms

- Location of Kalmthout in the province of Antwerp
- Interactive map of Kalmthout
- Location in Belgium
- Coordinates: 51°23′N 04°28′E
- Country: Belgium
- Community: Flemish Community
- Region: Flemish Region
- Province: Antwerp
- Arrondissement: Antwerp

Government
  - Mayor: Lukas Jacobs (CD&V)
  - Governing party: CD&V

Area
  - Total: 59.41 km^{2} (22.94 sq mi)

Population (2020-01-01)
  - Total: 18,872
  - Density: 317.7/km^{2} (822.7/sq mi)
- Postal codes: 2920
- NIS code: 11022
- Area codes: 03
- Website: www.kalmthout.be

Kalmthout (Dutch pronunciation: [ˈkɑl(ə)mtɦʌut]) is a municipality in the Belgian province of Antwerp. The municipality comprises the villages of Kalmthout, Achterbroek, Heide, and Nieuwmoer. In 2021, Kalmthout had a population of 19,020. The total area is 59.45 square kilometres (22.95 sq mi).

In addition to Kalmthout itself, the municipality also contains the communities of Dorp-Heuvel, Heide, Achterbroek, and Nieuwmoer.

The Arboretum Kalmthout is one of Belgium's most beautiful botanical gardens. The Kalmthoutse Heide is a nature reserve of nearly 10,000 acres (40 km^{2}) spanning the border between Belgium and the Netherlands.

== Sightseeing ==
The "Kalmthoutse Heide" is a big natural park in Kalmthout. It is open to the public and has more than 15 different routes that can run for tens of kilometers.

The first synagogue outside of a city in Belgium was built in 1928 on Leopoldstraat in the village of Heide. This pre-dates the Catholic church St. Jozef's and can be seen on the local walking tour. The Jewish community played an important part in local history, with the first Belgian yeshiva also being built in Heide. Many architecturally innovative villas from the community still stand and can be seen during walking tours guided by local historians.

== Notable inhabitants ==
- Peter Janssens van Kalmthout (c. 1535 – 1572), Norbertine priest, was born here
- Hector Carlier (1884–1946), industrialist and cofounder of Petrofina
- Maria Rosseels (1916–2005), journalist and writer
- Willy Vandersteen (1913–1990), Flemish comic book creator of Spike and Suzy
- Karel Bossart (1903–1975), designer of the Atlas missile
- Sam Dejonghe (born 1991), racing driver
- The three members of Flemish folk and world music group Laïs are from Kalmthout.

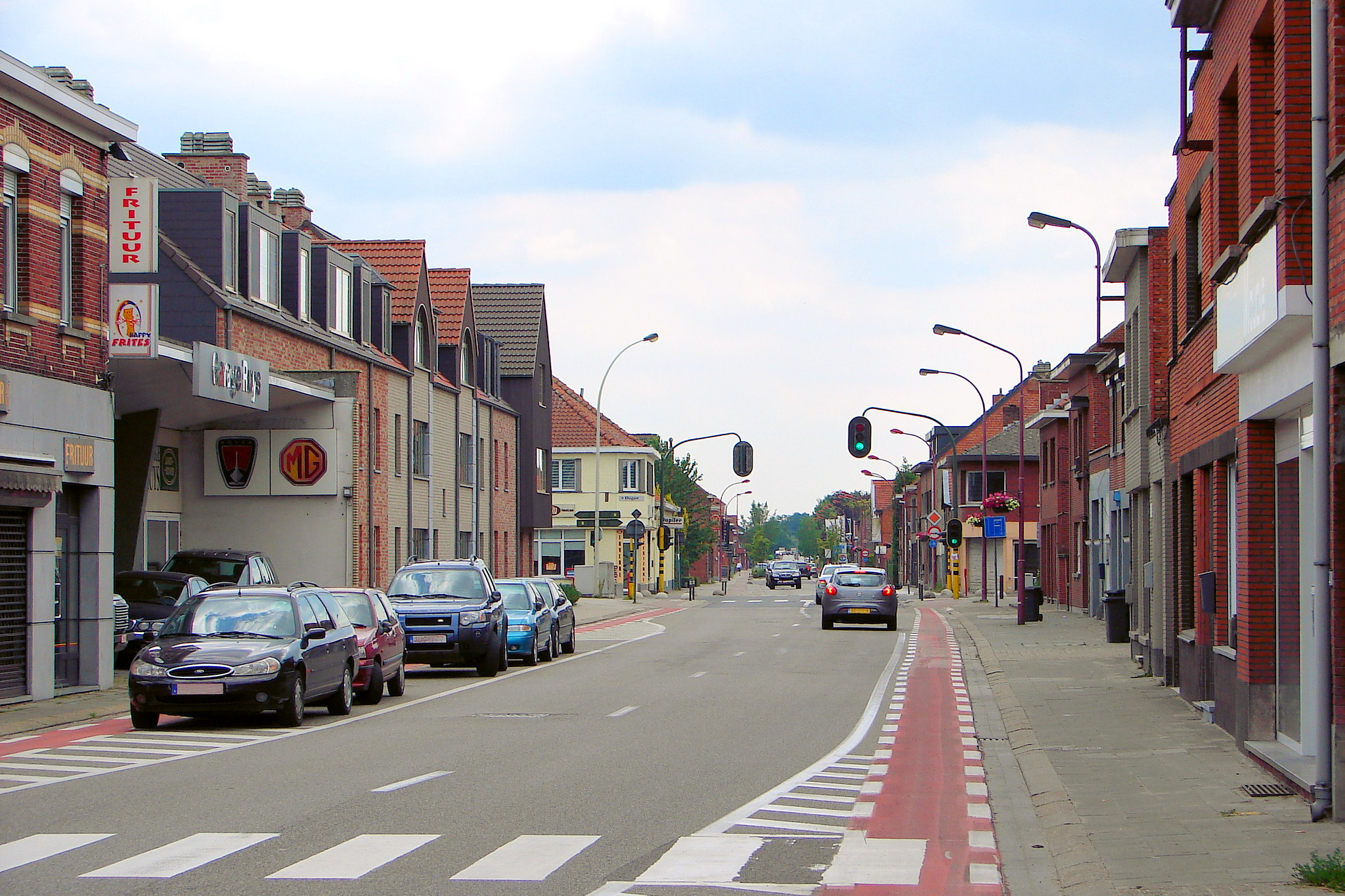
Achterbroek

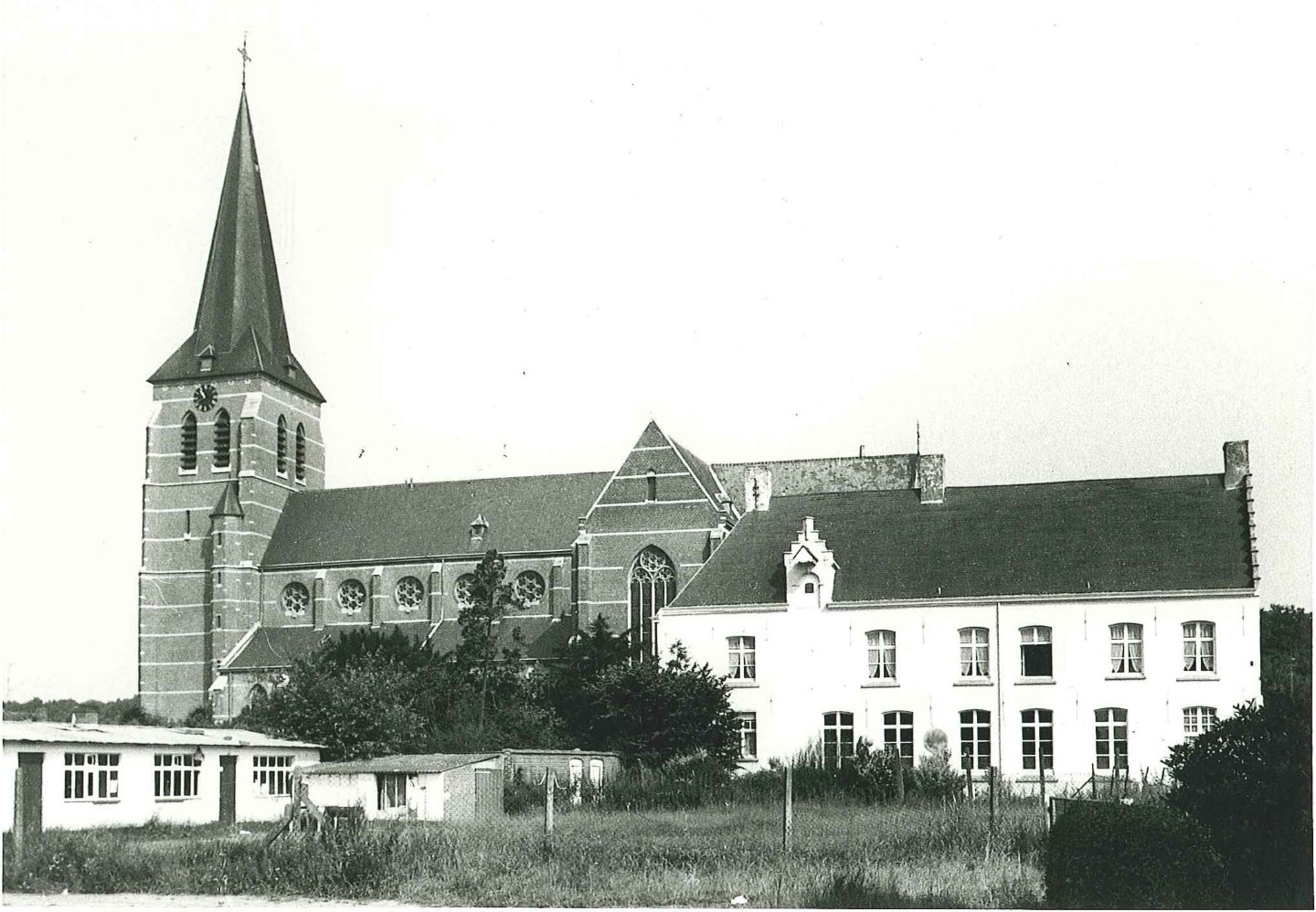
Onze-Lieve-Vrouwkerk (Kalmthout)
