= Petrofina =

1920–2000 Belgian oil company

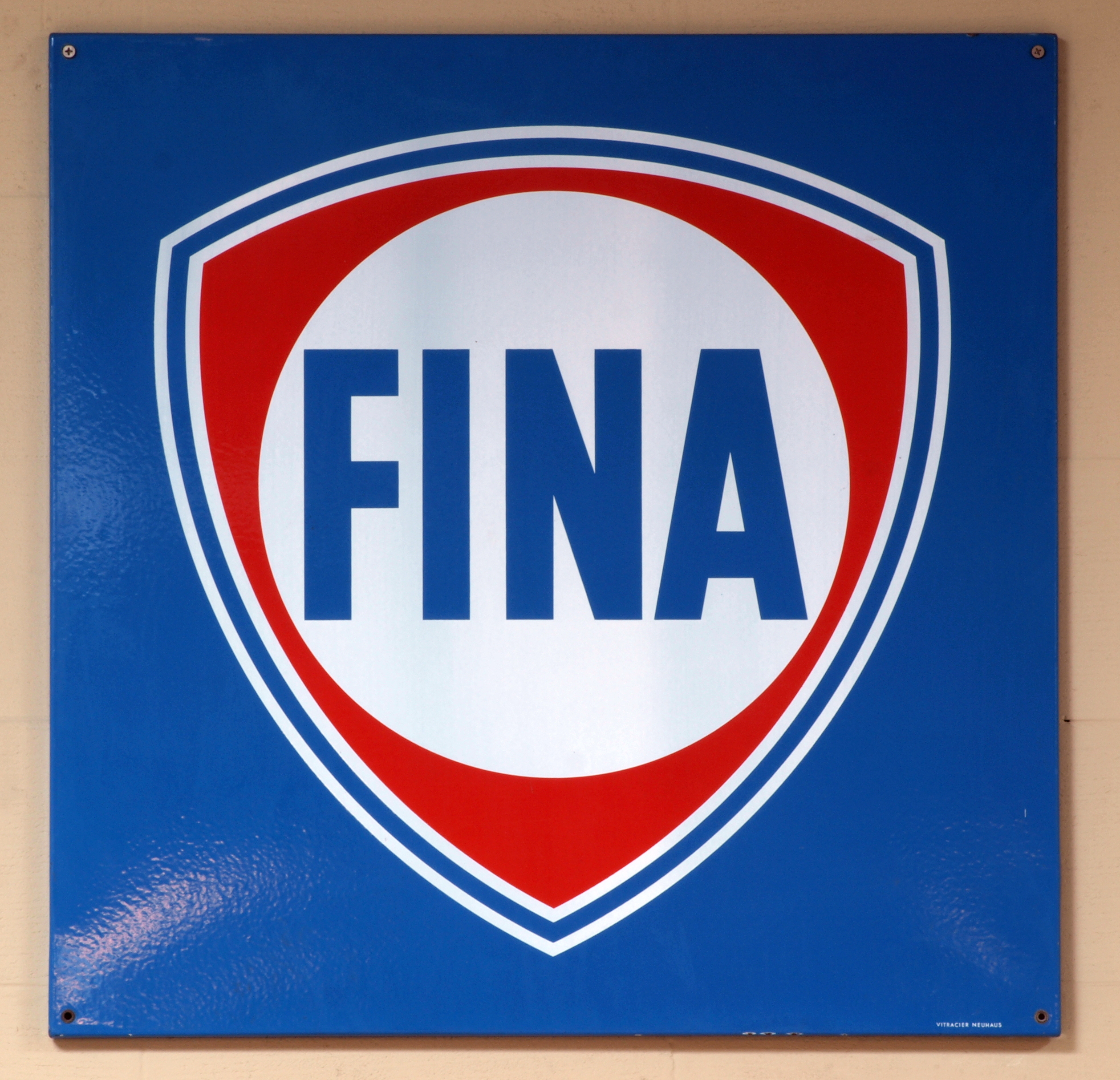
- Company type: public
- Industry: Petroleum
- Predecessor: Compagnie d'Anvers; Hydrofina
- Founded: February 25, 1920; 106 years ago
- Defunct: 2000; 26 years ago
- Fate: Merged with Total S.A. to form TotalFinaElf
- Successor: TotalEnergies
- Headquarters: Belgium
- Products: Fuels, lubricants
- Revenue: $
- Website: n/a

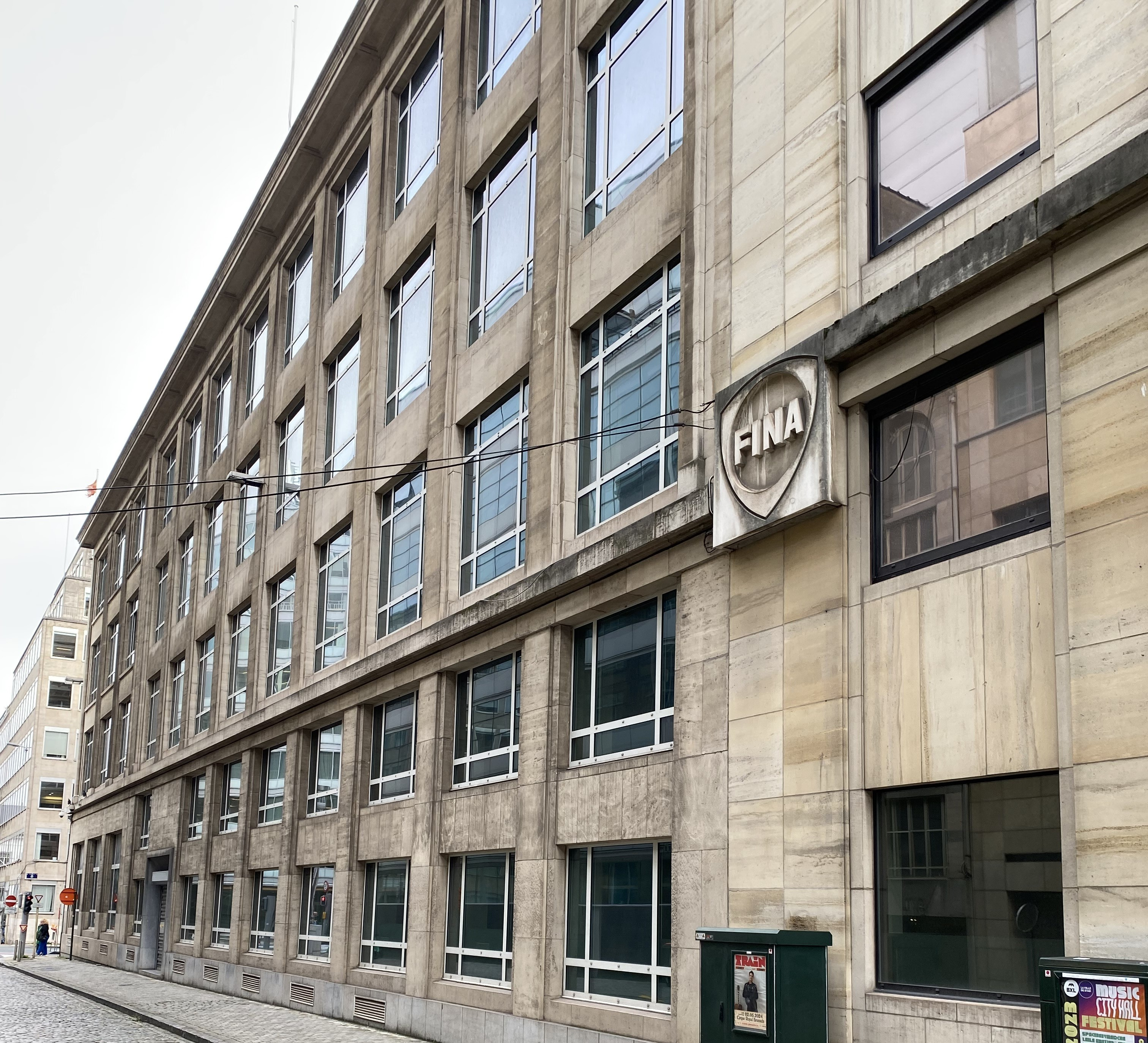
Fina logo on the company's former head office in Brussels

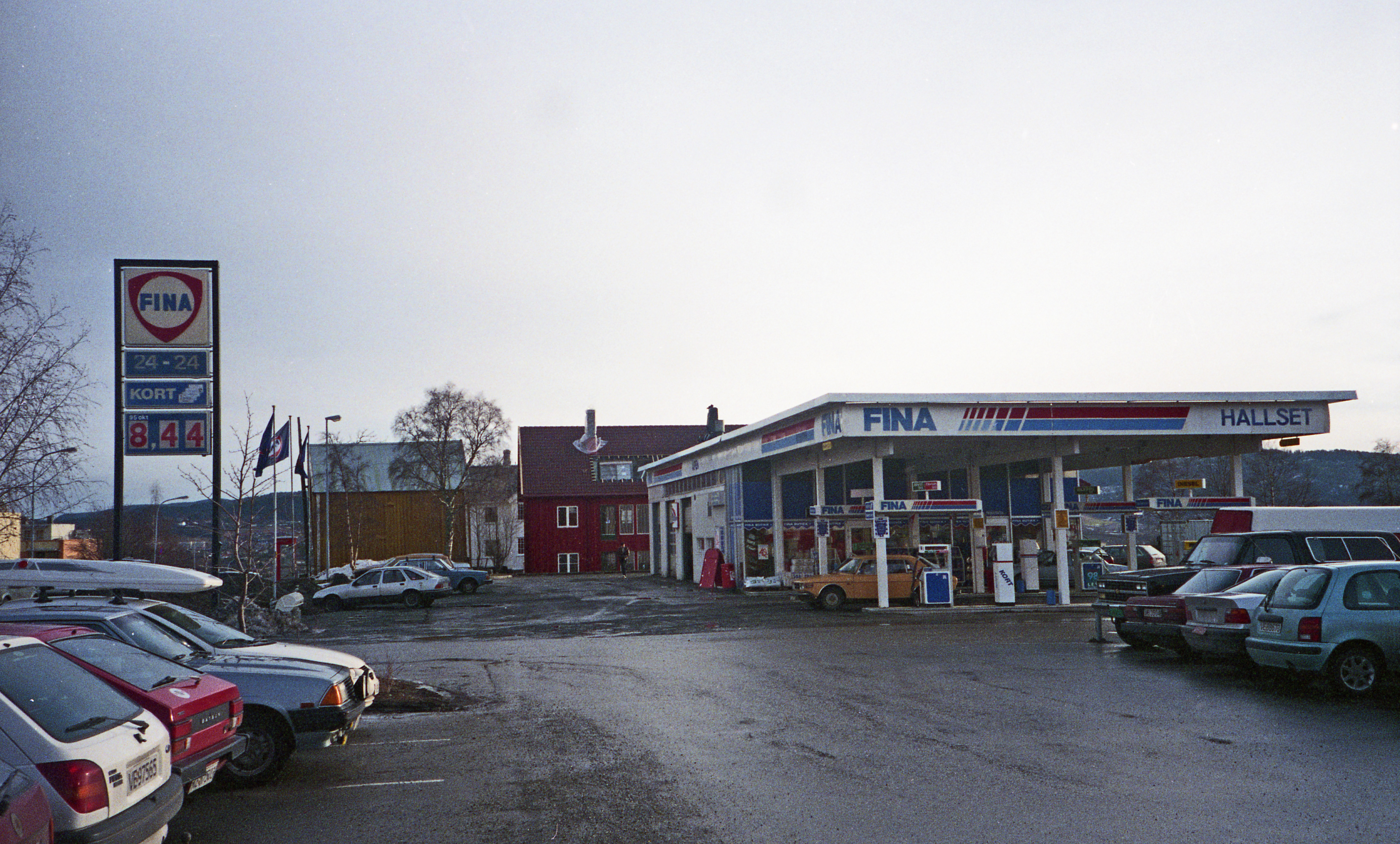
A Fina petrol station in Trondheim, Norway in 1998.

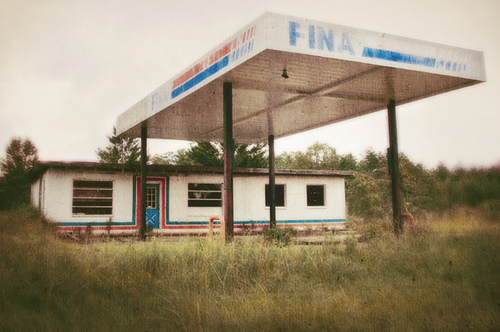
A closed Fina petrol station in Florida, US.

Petrofina was a Belgian oil company. It merged with Total in 1999 to form TotalFina, which after subsequent mergers has changed its name back to Total. In the United States, Fina's former refining and marketing operations are now owned by Delek US.

== History ==
Petrofina was founded on 25 February 1920 by Auguste Diagre, Hector Carlier his brother Fernand and Aloys Van de Vyvere as an Antwerp-based group called Compagnie Financière Belge des Pétroles, but changed to PetroFina to reflect their telegraphic address name.

In 1981, Petrofina sold its Canadian retail operations in eastern Canada to the Canadian government and became part of Petro-Canada.

Petrofina merged with Total S.A. of France to form TotalFina and with Elf in 2000 to form TotalFinaElf. The company's current name is TotalEnergies (since 2021).

== Fina in the United States - "Pink Air" and "Pflash" ==
Petrofina expanded its operations to the United States in 1956 with the purchase of Texas-based Panhandle Oil Company, which was headquartered in Wichita Falls, Texas, where the firm operated an oil refinery and marketed gasoline through service stations in Texas, Oklahoma and New Mexico. American Petrofina, as the United States operation was called, further expanded its presence in the US through the purchase of several small oil companies, the largest being the Cosden Oil Company from W.R. Grace in 1963, which gave Fina a very large chain of service stations in Texas and New Mexico along with an oil refinery in Big Spring, Texas.

The Fina brand appeared on gasoline and other petroleum products at Panhandle stations in 1958, with the service stations rebranded as Fina in 1959 and service stations acquired through purchase of Cosden and other companies also converted to the Fina brand. In 1961, Fina introduced its Pink Air promotional campaign noting that while Fina gasolines were loaded with all the same ingredients that made their fuels "Exactly As Good As The Best" adding that only at Fina stations could motorists get "Pink Air" for their tires to keep them from deteriorating. In its "Pink Air" ads, Fina (then undergoing a major expansion of its marketing territory which encompassed the Mid-Continent region from Texas to Minnesota) noted that Pink Air was arriving at new Fina stations as fast as they could be opened and set a goal of having Pink Air in all of its stations by May 1966 - five years later.

In 1966, when "Pink Air" finally arrived at every Fina station, Fina replaced that campaign with a new one regarding an ingredient in its gasoline called "Pflash." At a time when other US oil companies were promoting their gasoline products with campaigns such as Exxon/Esso's "Put A Tiger in Your Tank!", Shell's "Platformate" additive that they claimed to improve gas mileage, Texaco's invitation to "Trust Your Car to the Man Who Wears The Star" and Mobil's "Detergent gasoline"; ""PFLASH", was promoted as an ingredient in Fina gasoline that would improve driving pleasure by "turning red lights green," "smoothing out rough roads," "improving the food at roadside restaurants" and "making you feel less sorry you ever got a driver's license." Fina stations even offered free "Pflash" bumper stickers to motorists who pulled in for gasoline purchases.

In 1973, American Petrofina expanded its marketing area to include Florida, Georgia and several other Southeastern states following the purchase of BP's marketing assets including service stations, terminals and jobber contracts, converting them to the Fina brand. Another expansion of Fina's marketing operations came in 1984, when American Petrofina purchased several thousand service stations from Oklahoma-based Champlin Refining Company following that firm's closing of its Enid, Oklahoma refinery. The Champlin assets were rebranded as Fina stations in several Mid-Continent states including Texas, Oklahoma, Kansas, Nebraska and Iowa among others.

Petrofina's U.S. subsidiary, Fina Inc., announced that it would move its headquarters to Houston from Plano, Texas in 2000. Fina Inc. planned to occupy 149,000 square feet (13,800 m^{2}) in the World Houston Plaza building, near George Bush Intercontinental Airport.

In 2005, Total Petrochemicals USA, Inc., moved to offices in downtown Houston. Petrochemicals USA, Inc. has retained the petrochemicals operations of the former Fina, and the Port Arthur, Texas refinery.

== US Fina assets now owned by Alon USA ==
Since the Total-Petrofina merger in 1999, all of Fina's former marketing assets and the Big Spring refinery have been owned by Texas-based Alon USA. Alon assets include the former Fina refinery at Big Spring, Texas and the Fina brand name. Alon supplies gasoline and other petroleum products to 1,200 Fina stations directly and through distributors in seven Southwestern states including Texas, Oklahoma, Arkansas, Louisiana, New Mexico, Arizona and the southern portion of Colorado. Alon also owns Southwest Convenience Stores, which is the largest franchiser of 7-Eleven convenience stores in the United States. Southwest owns and operates 160 7-Eleven stores in West Texas and New Mexico, each of which sell Fina gasoline. In 2012, Alon announced it would be converting all of its retail locations to the Alon gasoline brand, rather than extend the contract they had with TotalElf which lasted 12 years to keep using the Fina brand. Doing so would also allow them to expand beyond the original eight state territory they could use the Fina name in (Arizona, Arkansas, Oklahoma, Texas, Utah, Louisiana, Colorado, and New Mexico). This conversion was completed by the end of 2012 at all former Fina locations.

The Fina Port Arthur refinery is still owned by Total.

== BMW Motorsport ==
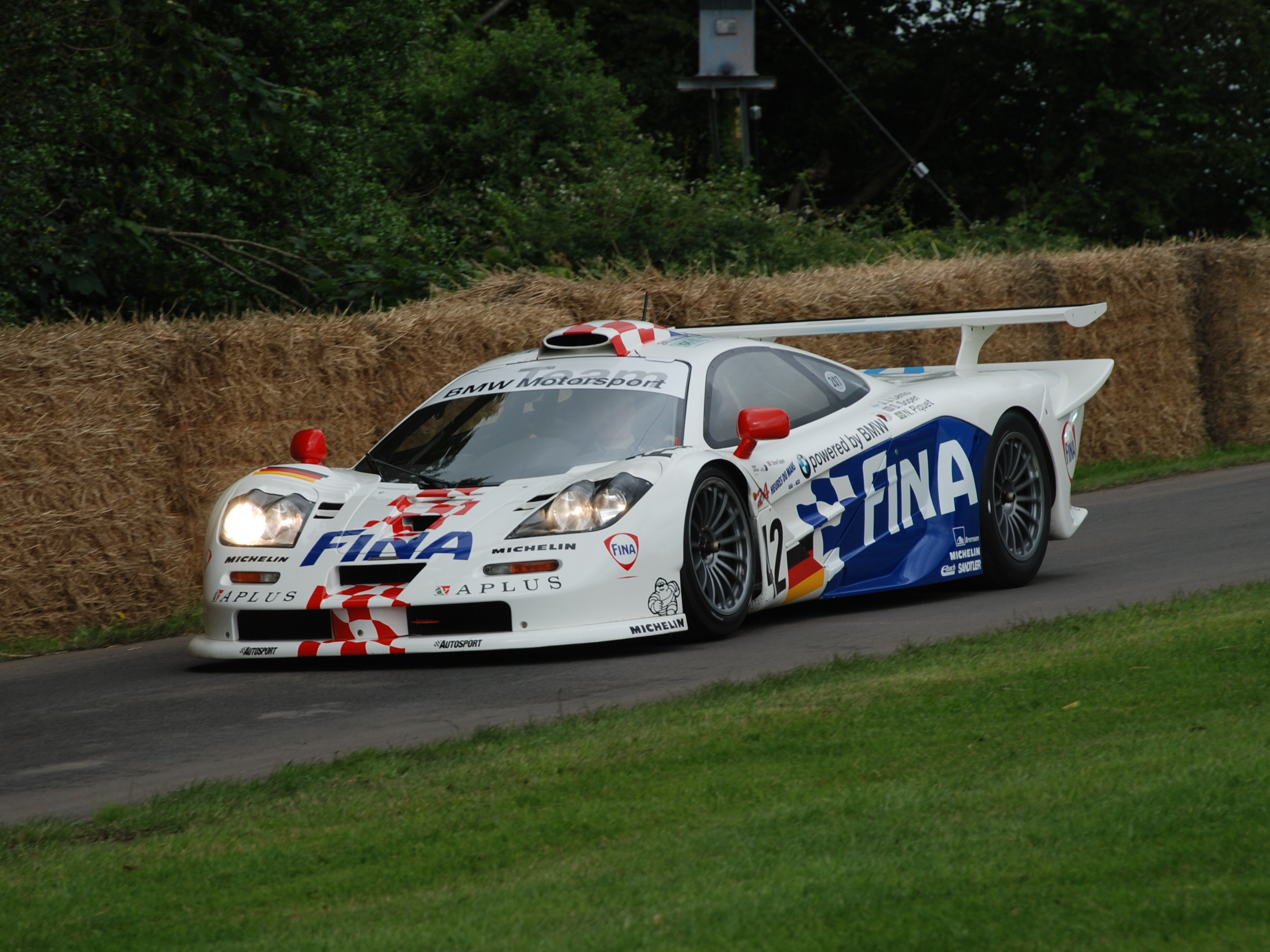
A 1997-spec McLaren F1 GTR Longtail, chassis #26R at the Goodwood Festival of Speed on 24 June 2016.

Fina were BMW's primary oil & lubricants partner from 1988 to 1998, featuring on all of BMW Motorsport's works team racing cars beginning with the 1988 European Touring Car Championship, through entries in the World Rally Championship, British Touring Car Championship, the Deutsche Tourenwagen Meisterschaft (DTM) until 1992 and the German Super Tourenwagen Cup (STW). Fina also supported BMW's in the French Touring Car Championship (Supertourisme), and both Rafanelli and Schnitzer Motorsport's 24 Hours of Le Mans entries, plus the works McLaren-BMW F1 GTR and GTR Longtail from 1996 to 1998 at Le Mans and the FIA GT Championship.

== NASCAR sponsorship ==
Fina was a major sponsor of NASCAR teams in the 1990s, most notably of Randy LaJoie's Busch Series (now Xfinity Series) teams. Fina was LaJoie's primary sponsor from 1993-1994, and then again from 1996-1998, which included two Busch Series championships in 1996 and 1997 in the #74 Fina Chevrolets owned by Bill Baumgartner.
