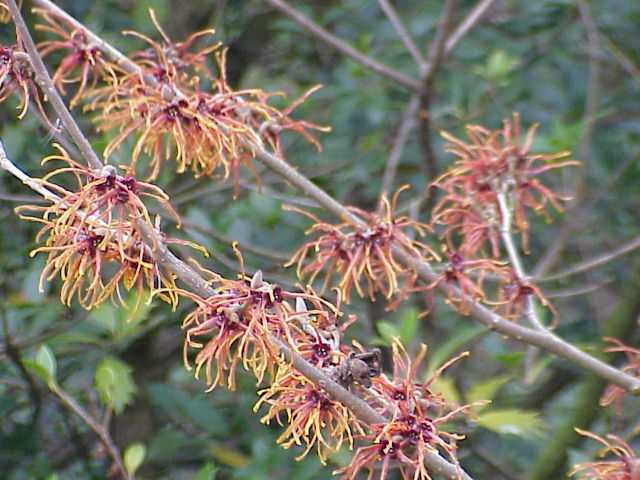
- 'Diane' in bloom

Scientific classification
- Kingdom: Plantae
- Clade: Tracheophytes
- Clade: Angiosperms
- Clade: Eudicots
- Order: Saxifragales
- Family: Hamamelidaceae
- Genus: Hamamelis
- Species: H. × intermedia

Binomial name
- Hamamelis × intermedia Rehder

= Hamamelis × intermedia =

Hybrid flowering plant

Hamamelis × intermedia, the hybrid witch hazel, is a flowering plant in the family Hamamelidaceae. It is a hybrid of garden origin between H. japonica and H. mollis. Its Latin name refers to its intermediate appearance between those two species.

The hybrid was first described by Alfred Rehder in 1945.

It is a deciduous shrub growing to 4 m (13 ft) tall and wide, with zig-zagging stems and alternate, simple leaves 15 cm (6 in) long, which turn yellow in autumn. The yellow, orange or red flowers with twisted petals appear on bare stems in midwinter through early spring.

Numerous cultivars have been developed, many of them prized as garden subjects. The following have gained the Royal Horticultural Society's Award of Garden Merit:

- 'Angelly'
- 'Aphrodite'
- 'Arnold Promise'
- 'Aurora'
- 'Barmstedt Gold'
- 'Diane'
- 'Frederic'
- 'Harry'
- 'Jelena'
- 'Pallida'
- ‘Robert'
- 'Rubin'
- 'Vesna'

== Gallery ==
Blooming Hamamelis × intermedia cultivars

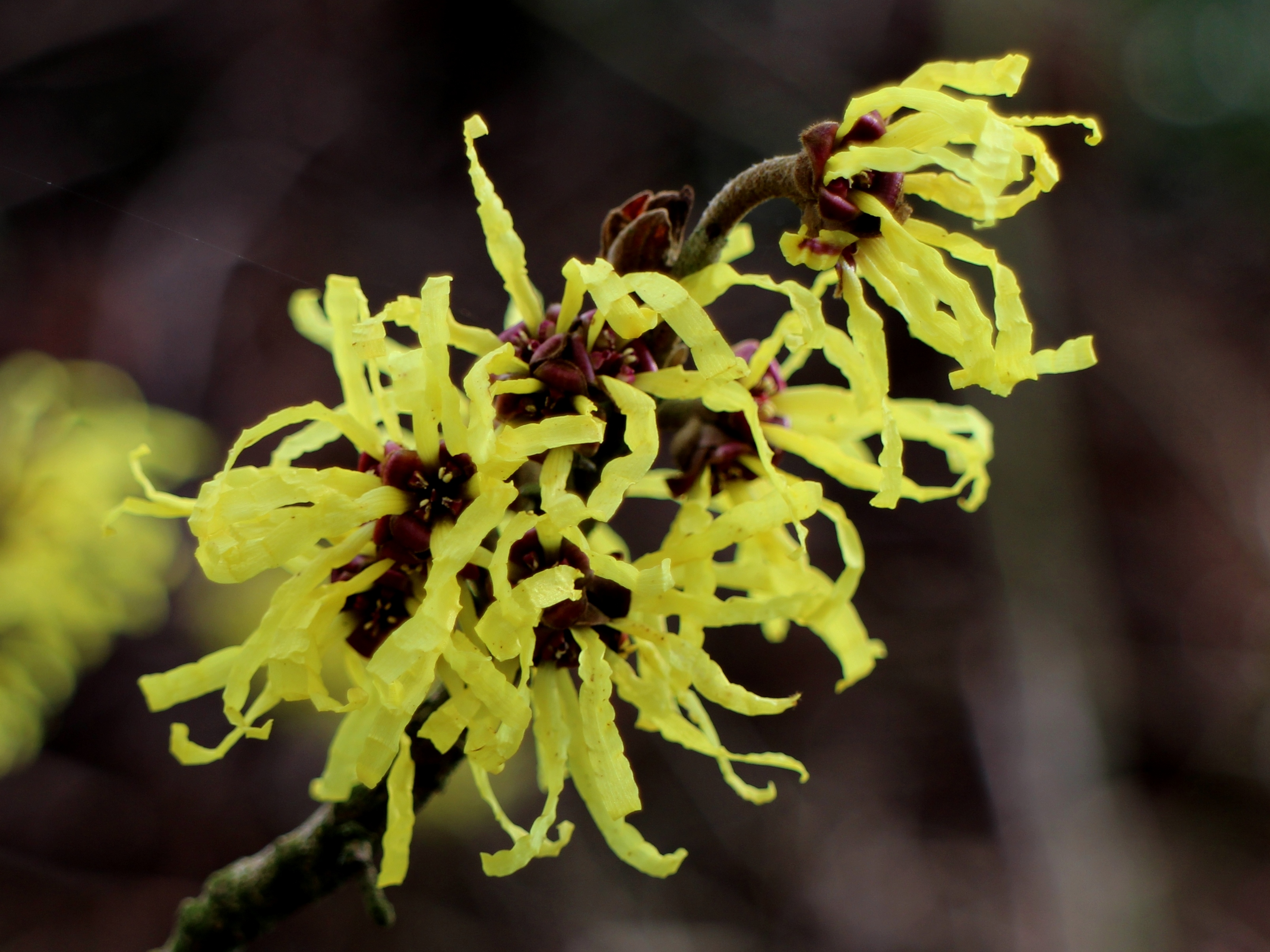
Hamamelis × intermedia 'Angelly'

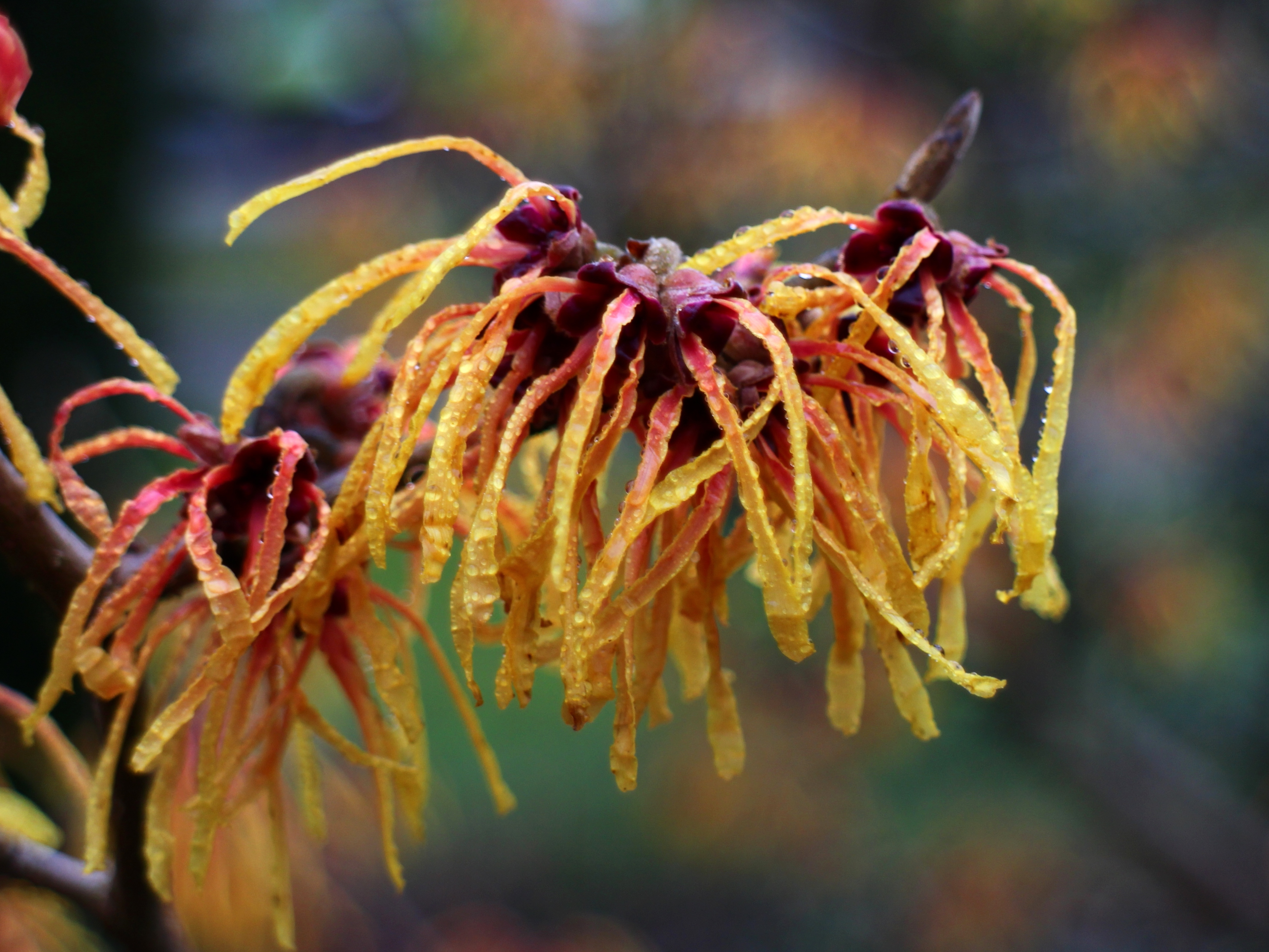
Hamamelis × intermedia 'Aphrodite'

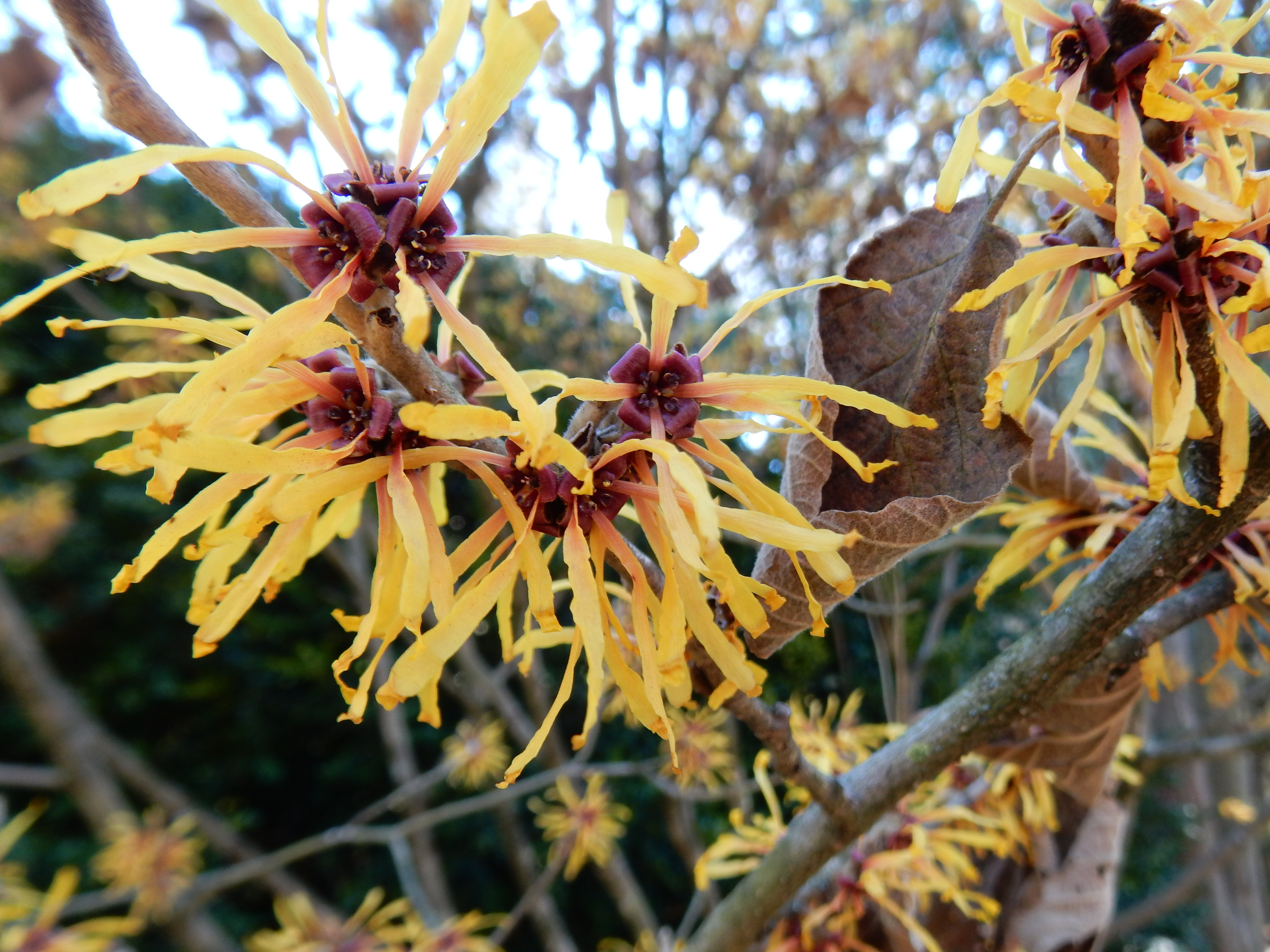
Hamamelis × intermedia 'Harry'

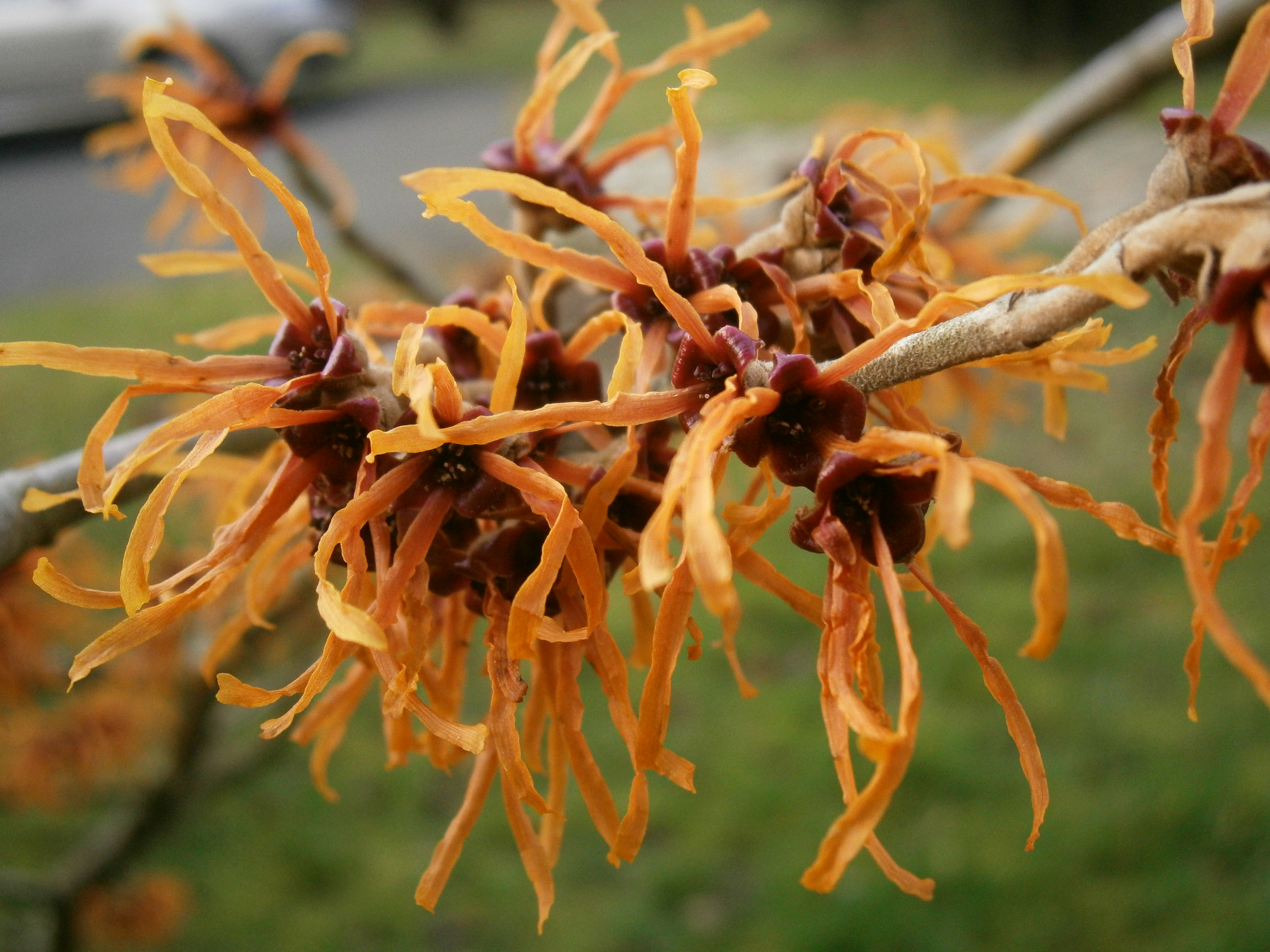
Hamamelis × intermedia 'Jelena'

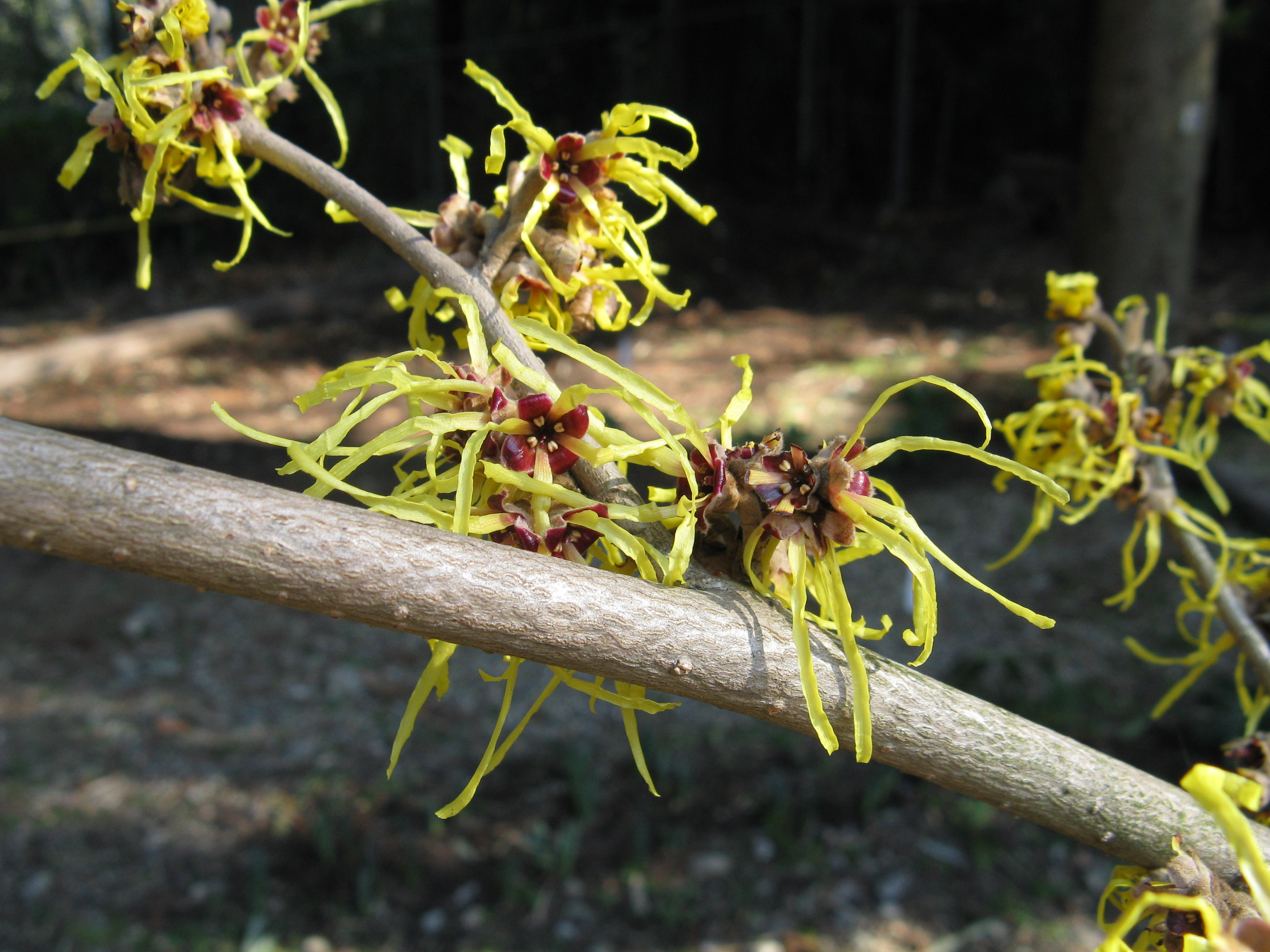
Hamamelis × intermedia 'Pallida'

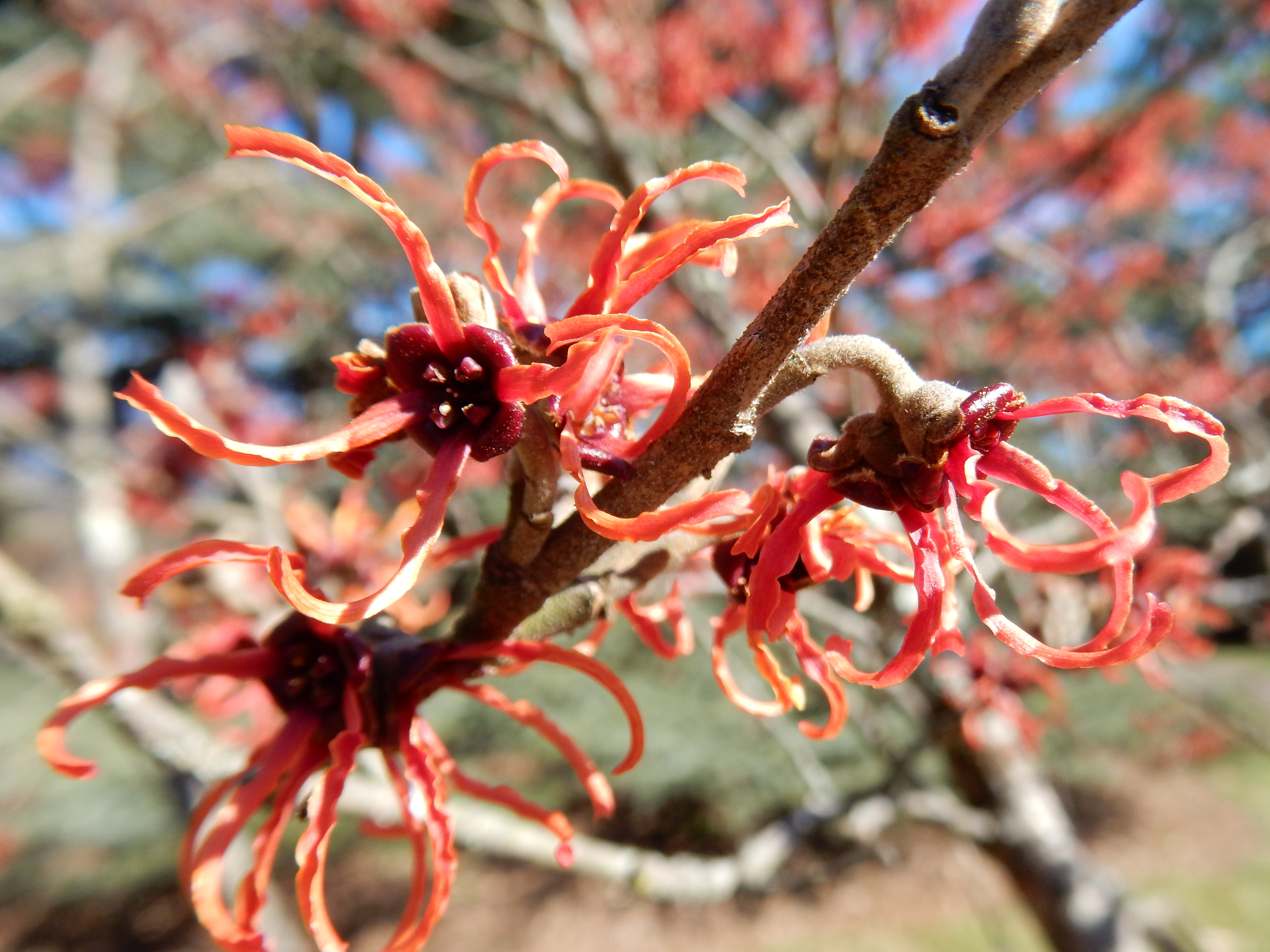
Hamamelis × intermedia 'Rubin'
