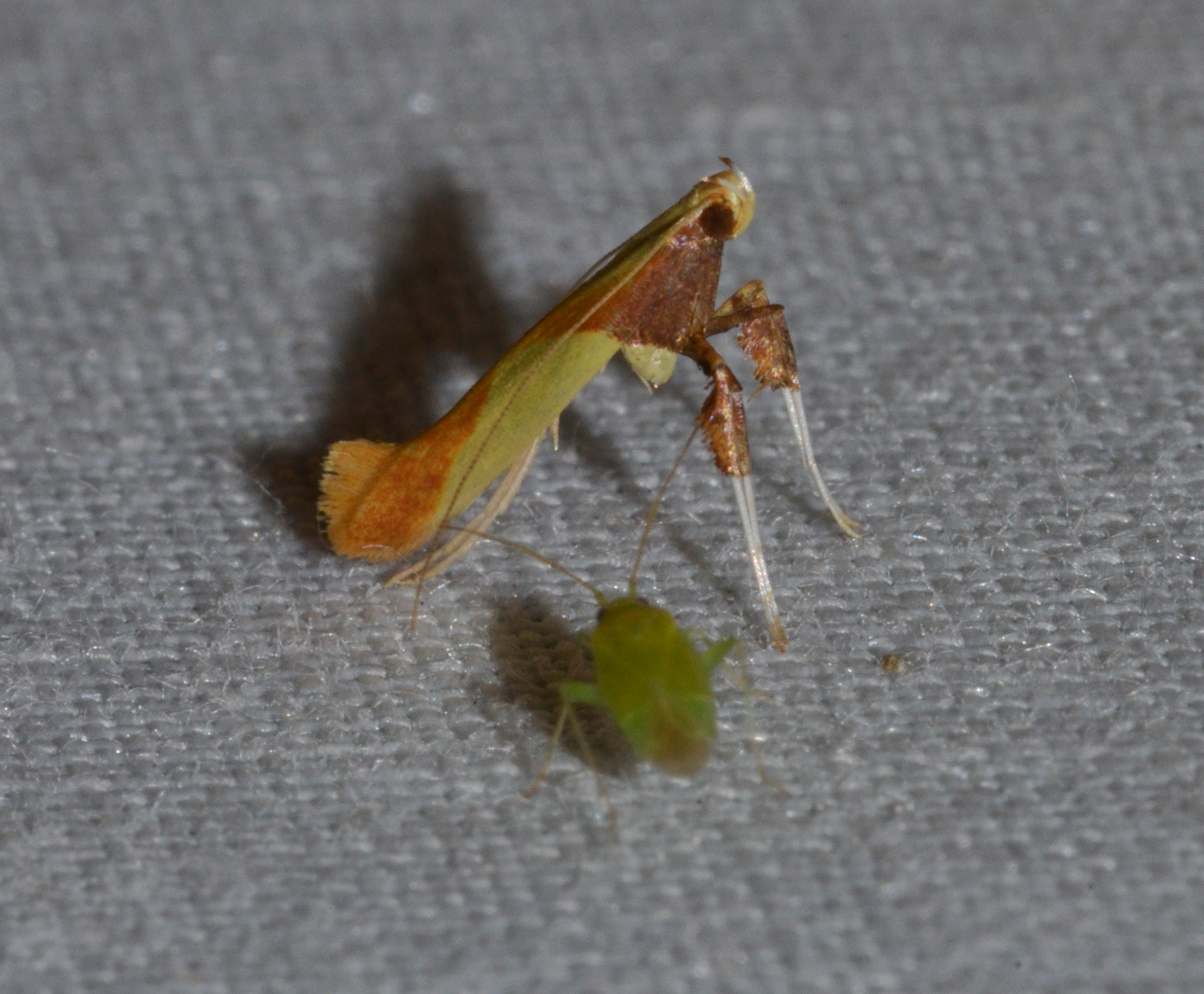

Scientific classification
- Kingdom: Animalia
- Phylum: Arthropoda
- Clade: Pancrustacea
- Class: Insecta
- Order: Lepidoptera
- Family: Gracillariidae
- Genus: Caloptilia
- Species: C. superbifrontella

Binomial name
- Caloptilia superbifrontella (Clemens, 1860)

= Caloptilia superbifrontella =

Species of moth

Caloptilia superbifrontella is a moth of the family Gracillariidae. It is known from Canada (Québec and Nova Scotia) and the United States (including Florida, Kentucky, Maine, Maryland, Michigan, New York, Vermont, Arkansas and West Virginia).

The wingspan is about 11 mm.

The larvae feed on Hamamelis species, including Hamamelis vernalis, Hamamelis virginica and Hamamelis virginiana. They mine the leaves of their host plant.
