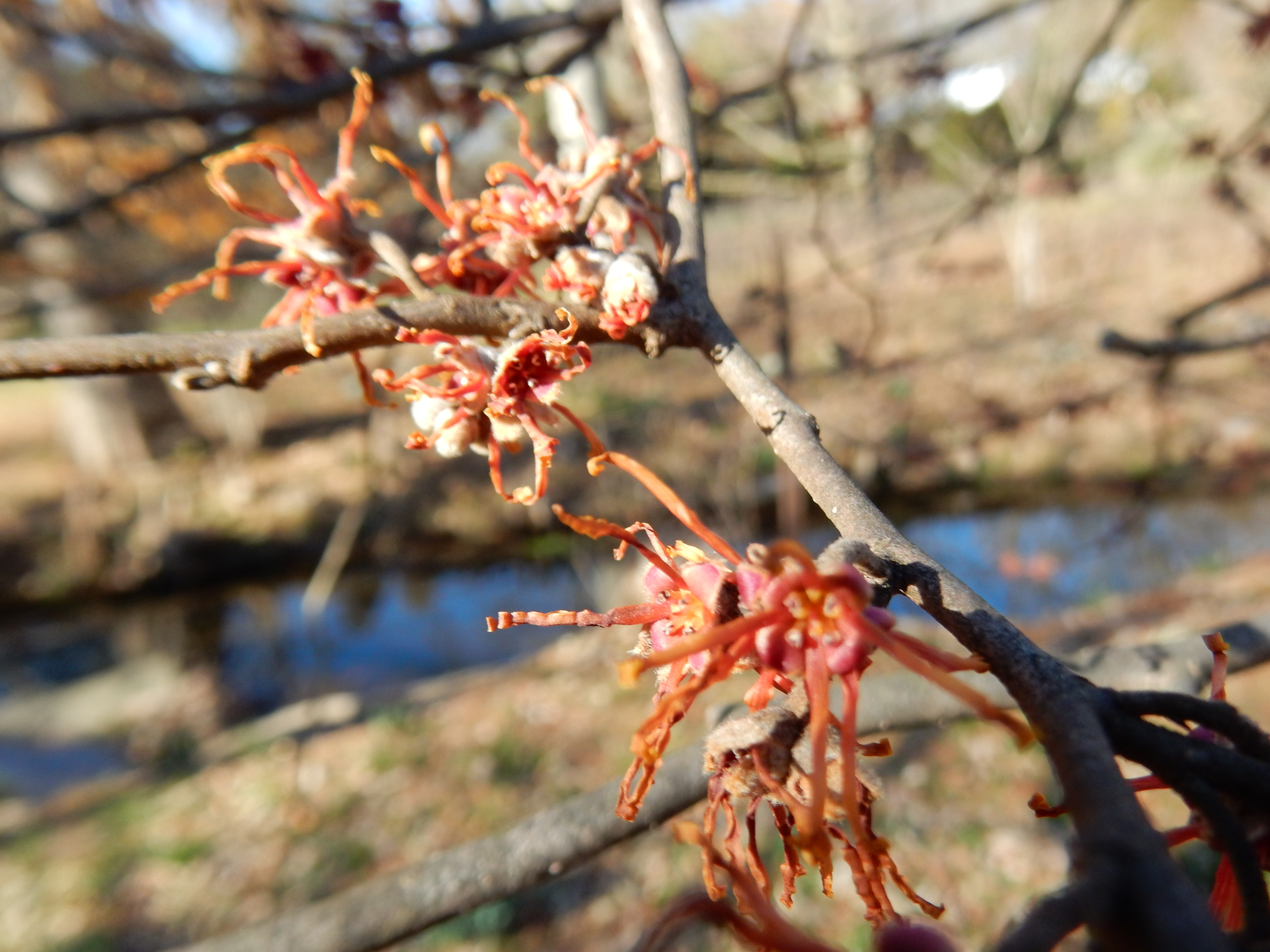

Scientific classification
- Kingdom: Plantae
- Clade: Tracheophytes
- Clade: Angiosperms
- Clade: Eudicots
- Order: Saxifragales
- Family: Hamamelidaceae
- Genus: Hamamelis
- Species: H. ovalis

Binomial name
- Hamamelis ovalis S.W.Leonard

= Hamamelis ovalis =

Species of witch-hazel

Hamamelis ovalis (known commonly as big-leaf witch-hazel, Leonard's witch-hazel, running witch-hazel, and southern witch-hazel) is a species of shrubby witch-hazel mostly found in the southeastern United States. It was first discovered in 2004, and subsequently described in 2005. Its leaves resemble those of the hazelnut, and its flowers can range from red to maroon, mostly open from December till February. It is one of three species in the genus Hamamelis that lives in North America.
