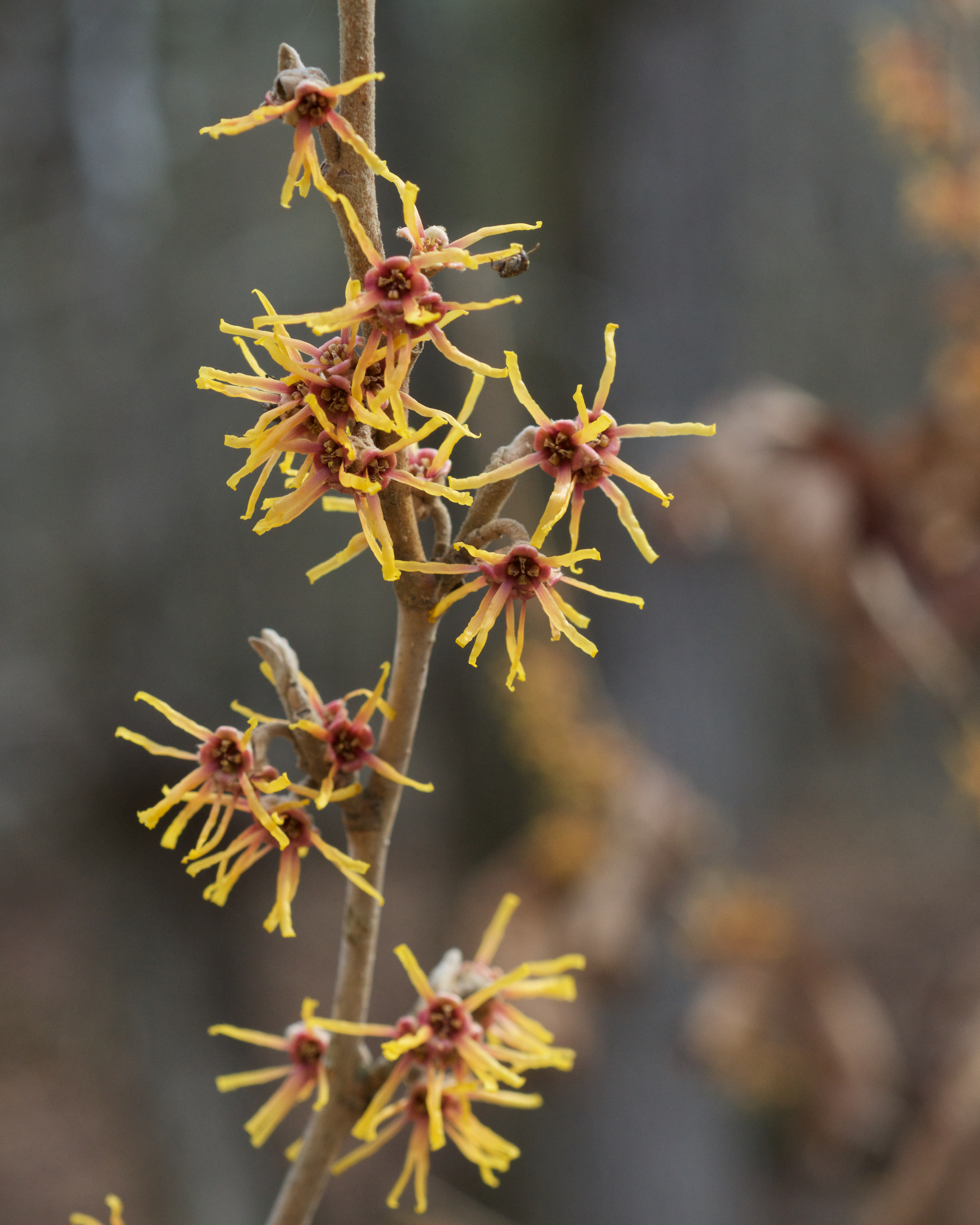
- Blooming in late February in the southern Ozarks

Scientific classification
- Kingdom: Plantae
- Clade: Tracheophytes
- Clade: Angiosperms
- Clade: Eudicots
- Order: Saxifragales
- Family: Hamamelidaceae
- Genus: Hamamelis
- Species: H. vernalis

Binomial name
- Hamamelis vernalis Sarg.

= Hamamelis vernalis =

Species of tree

Hamamelis vernalis, the Ozark witchhazel (or witch-hazel) is a species of flowering plant in the witch-hazel family Hamamelidaceae, native to the Ozark Plateau in central North America, in Missouri, Oklahoma, and Arkansas. It is a large deciduous shrub growing to 4 m (13 ft) tall.

== Description ==
Hamamelis vernalis spreads by stoloniferous root sprouts. The leaves are oval, 7–13 cm (2 3/4–5 in) long and 6.7–13 cm (2 5/8–5 1/8 in) broad, cuneate to slightly oblique at the base, acute or rounded at the apex. They have a wavy-toothed or shallowly lobed margin, and a short, stout petiole 7–15 mm (0.28–0.59 in) long. The leaves are dark green above, and glaucous beneath, and often persist into the early winter.

The flowers are deep to bright red, rarely yellow, with four ribbon-shaped petals 7–10 mm (0.28–0.39 in) long and four short stamens, and grow in clusters. Flowering begins in mid winter and continues until early spring. The Latin specific epithet vernalis means "spring-flowering".

The fruit is a hard woody capsule 10–15 mm (3/8–5/8 in) long, which splits explosively at the apex at maturity one year after pollination, ejecting the two shiny black seeds up to 10 m (33 ft) distant from the parent plant.

Although often occurring with the related Hamamelis virginiana, H. vernalis does not intergrade, and can be distinguished by its flowering in late winter (December to March in its native range), rather than fall.

== Cultivation and uses ==
Hamamelis vernalis is valued in cultivation for its strongly scented flowers appearing in late winter, when little else is growing. Several cultivars have been selected, mainly for variation in flower color, including 'Carnea' (pink flowers), 'Red Imp' (petals red with orange tips), and 'Squib' (vivid yellow flowers).

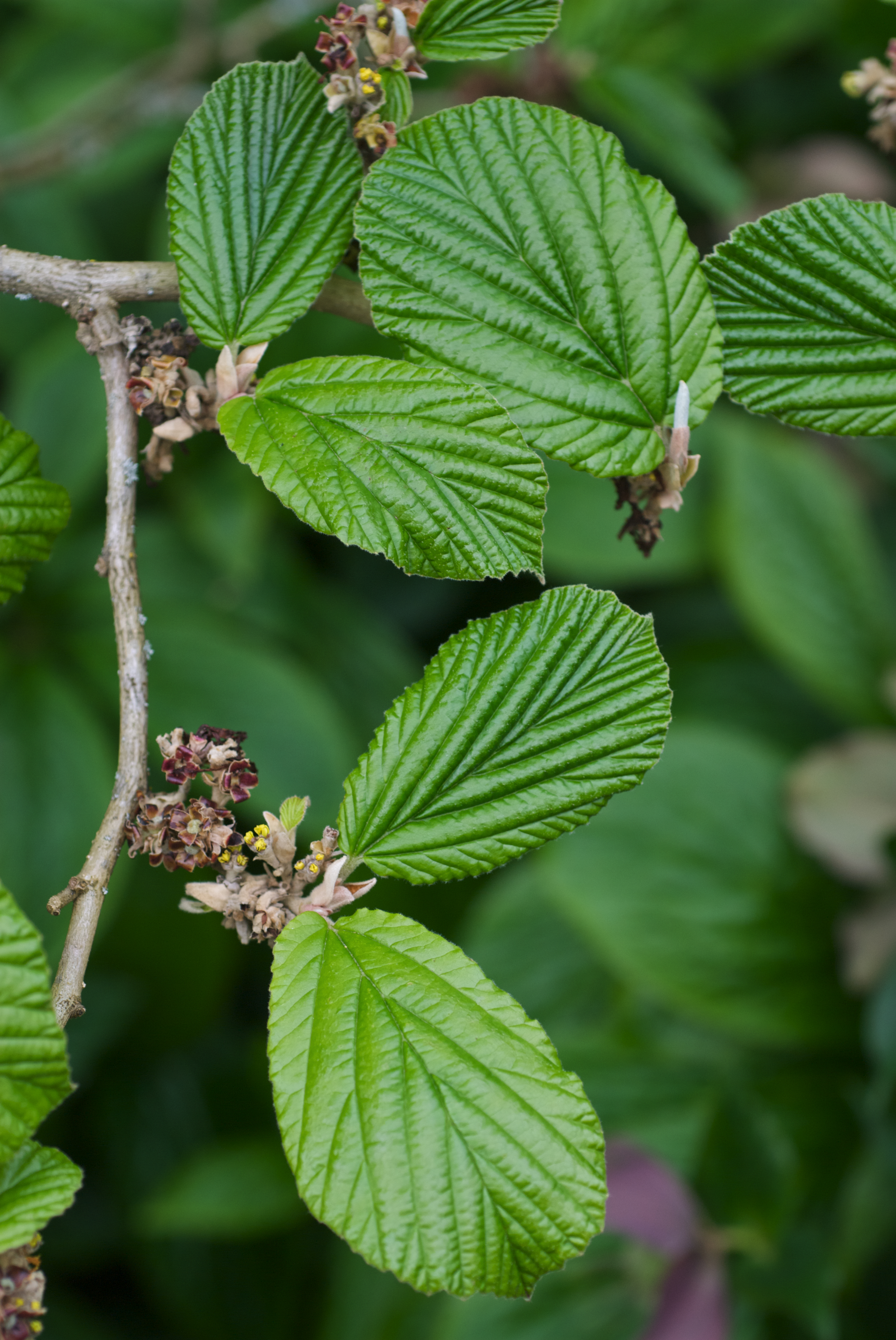
New foliage, spent flowers

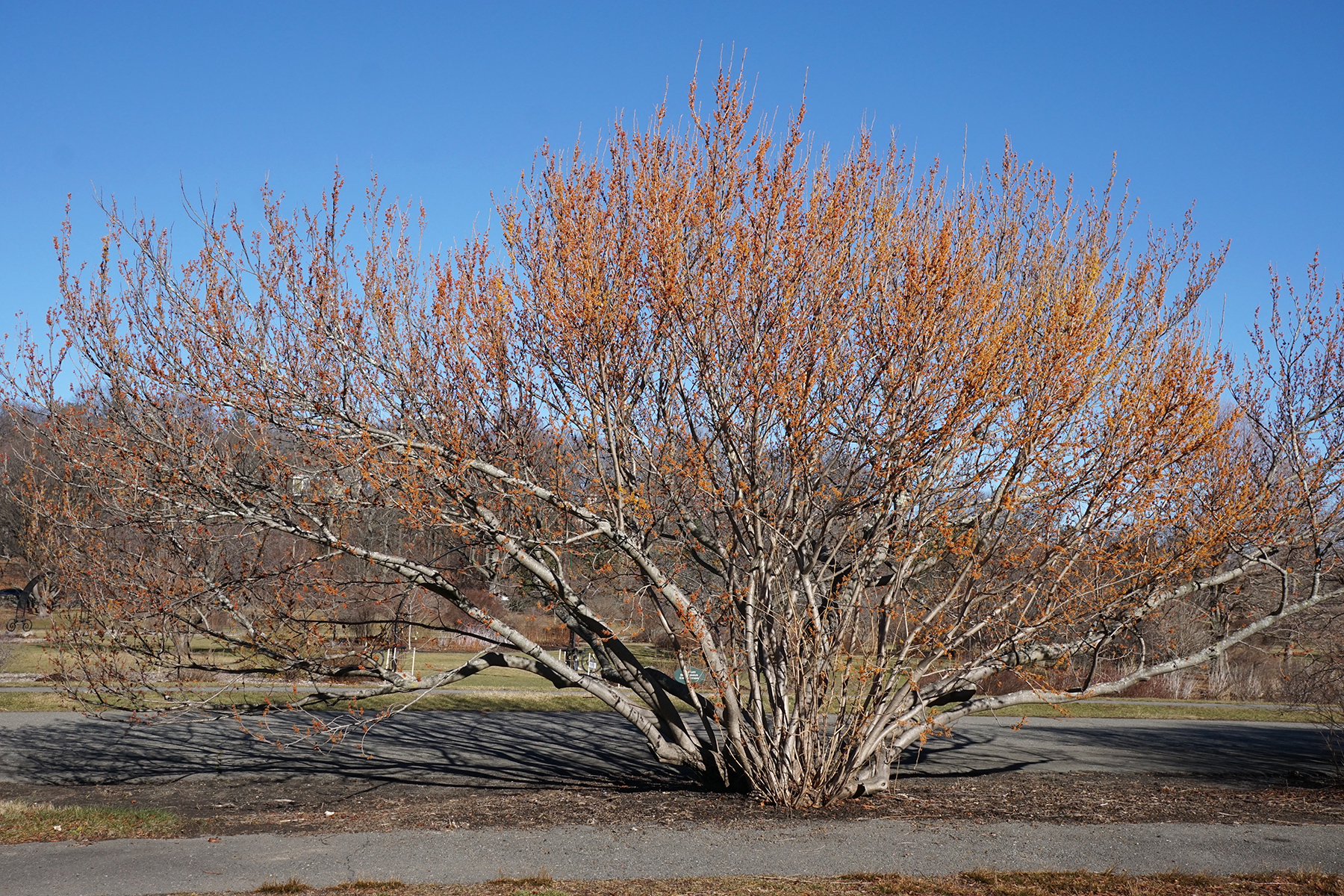

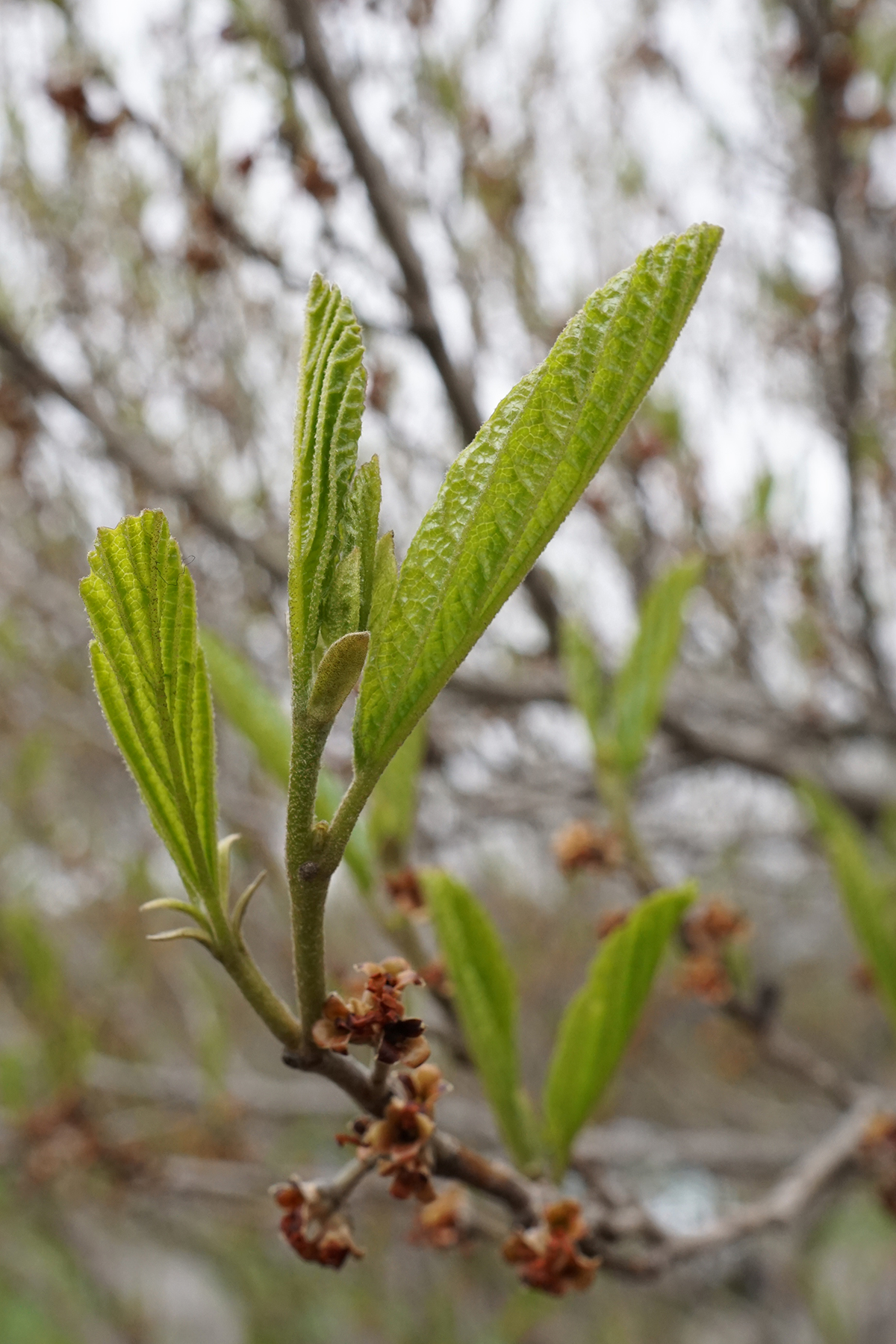

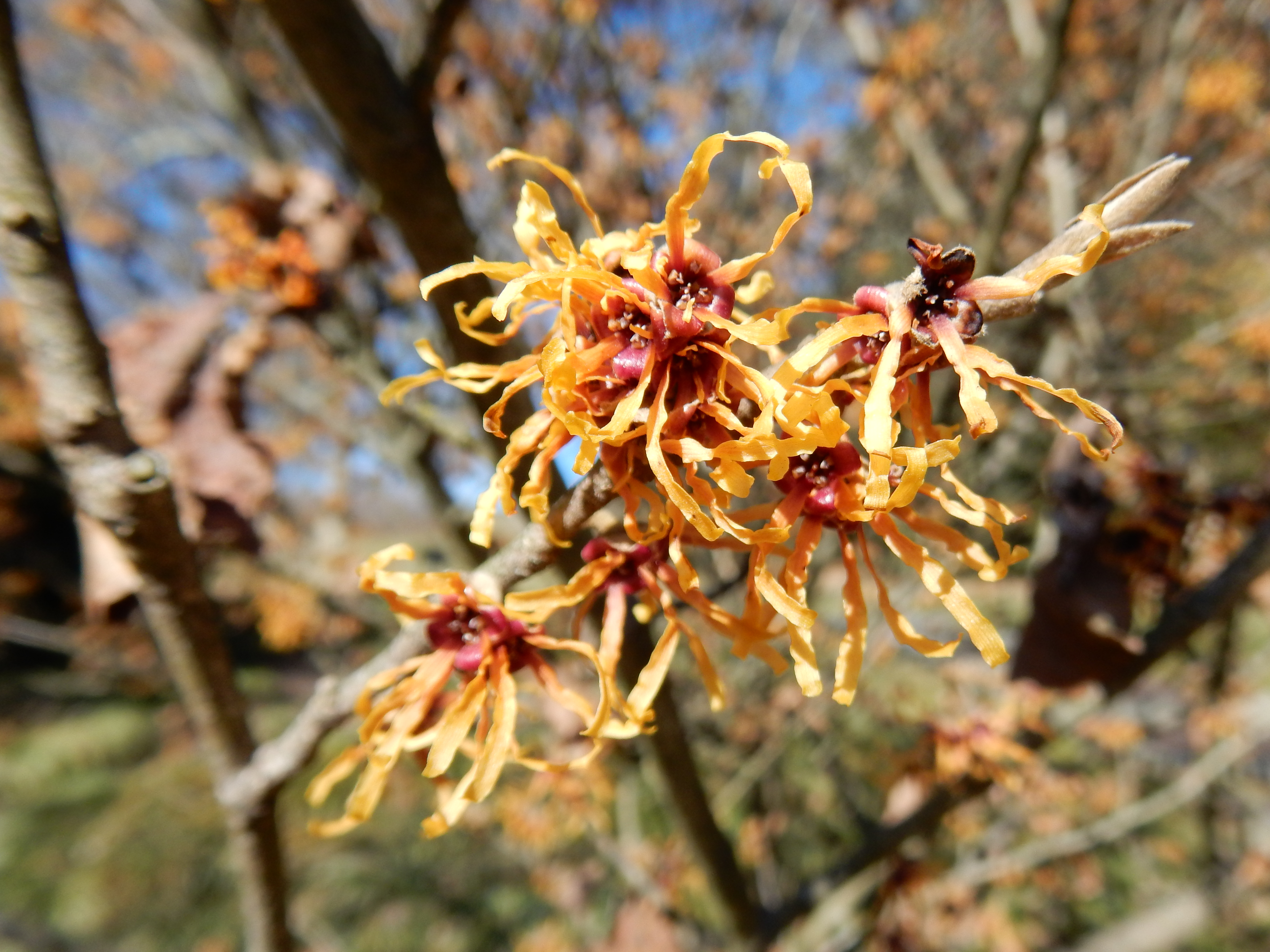
Flowers of Hamamelis vernalis 'Autumn embers' (copper-red)
