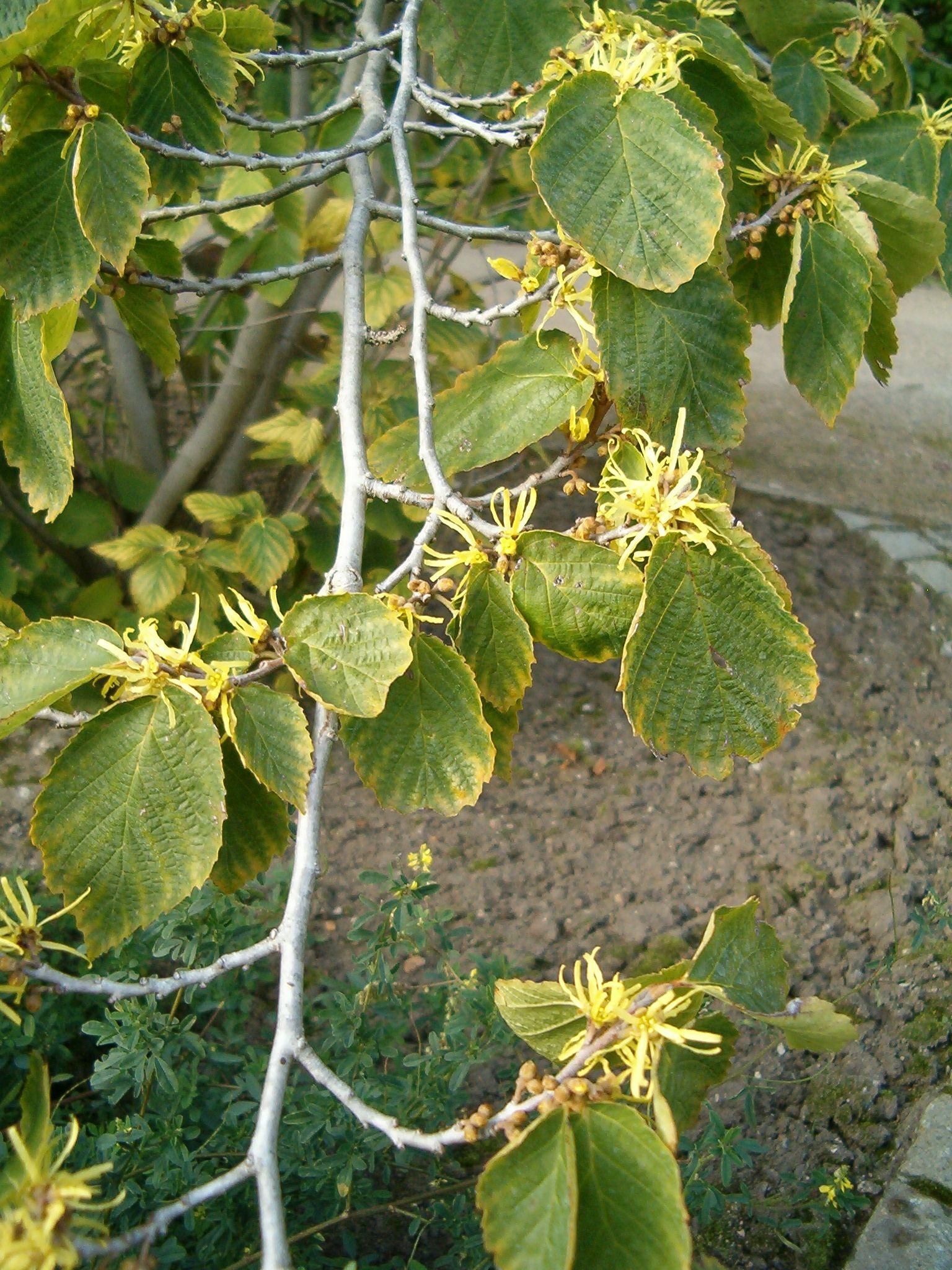
- Leaves and flowers in September

Conservation status
- Least Concern (IUCN 3.1)

Scientific classification
- Kingdom: Plantae
- Clade: Tracheophytes
- Clade: Angiosperms
- Clade: Eudicots
- Order: Saxifragales
- Family: Hamamelidaceae
- Genus: Hamamelis
- Species: H. virginiana

Binomial name
- Hamamelis virginiana L.
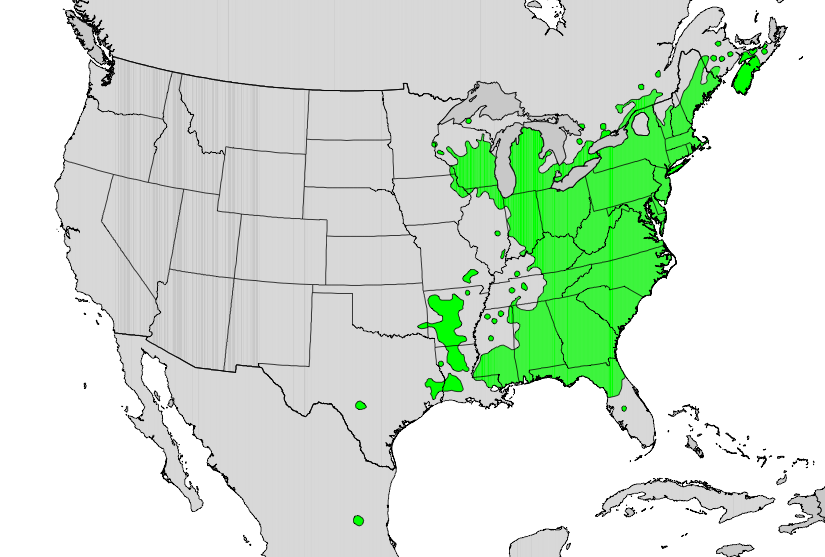
- Distribution of witch-hazel

= Hamamelis virginiana =

Species of plant

Hamamelis virginiana, known as witch-hazel, common witch-hazel, American witch-hazel and beadwood, is a species of flowering shrub native to eastern North America, from Nova Scotia west to Minnesota, and south to central Florida to eastern Texas.

== Description ==
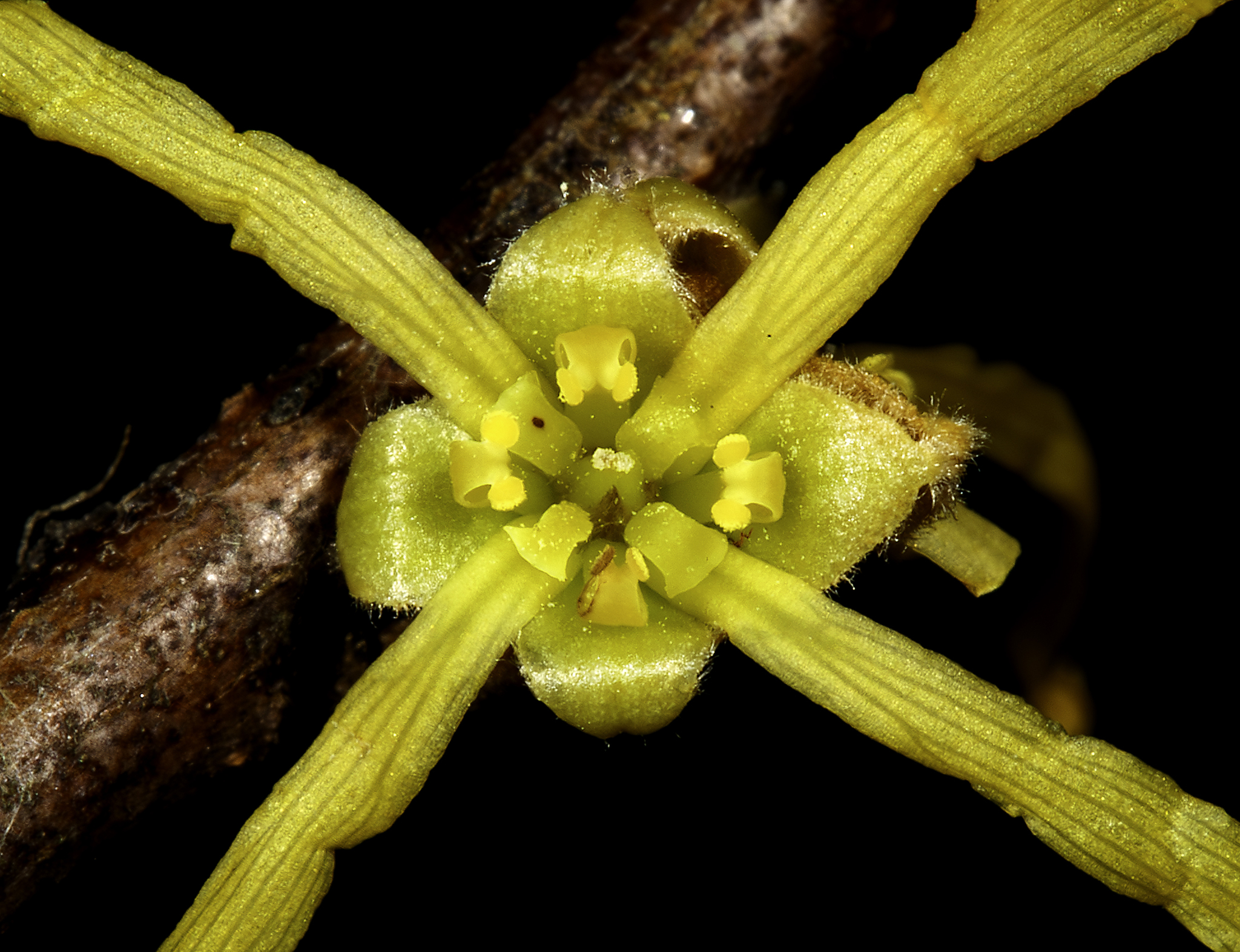
Close-up of flower in November

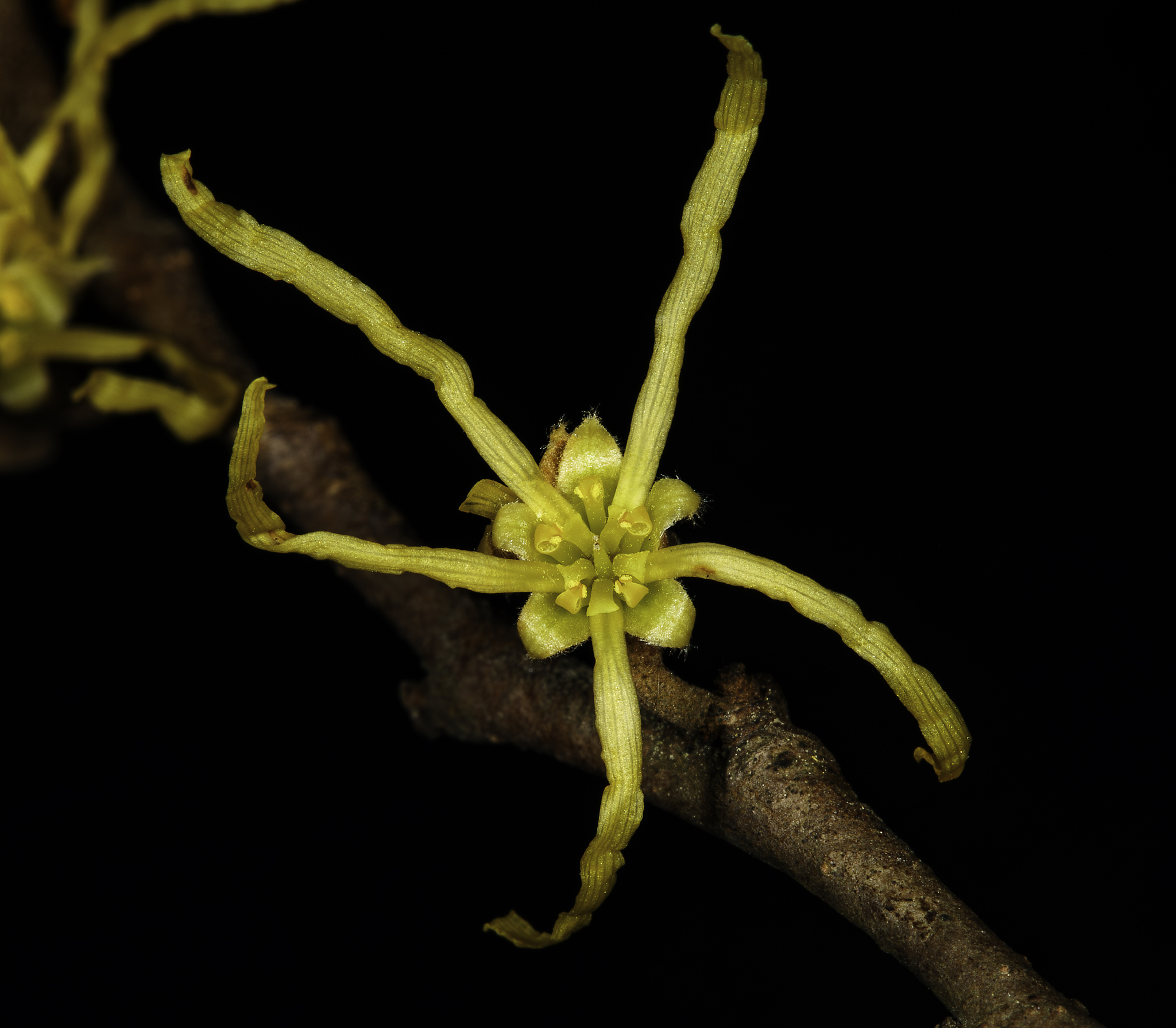
Atypical 5-merous flower

Hamamelis virginiana is a small, deciduous tree or shrub growing up to 6 metres (20 ft), rarely to 10 m (33 ft) tall, often with a dense cluster of stems from its base. The bark is light brown, smooth, scaly, inner bark reddish purple. The branchlets are pubescent at first, later smooth, light orange brown, marked with occasional white dots, finally dark or reddish brown. The foliage buds are acute, slightly falcate, downy, light brown. The leaves are oval, 3.7–16.7 cm (1 1/2–6 5/8 in) long and 2.5–13 cm (1–5 1/8 in) broad, oblique at the base, acute or rounded at the apex, with a wavy-toothed or shallowly lobed margin, and a short, stout petiole 6–15 mm (0.24–0.59 in) long; the midrib is more or less hairy, stout, with six to seven pairs of primary veins. The young leaves open involute, covered with stellate rusty down; when full grown, they are dark green above, and paler beneath. In fall, they turn yellow with rusty spots. The leaf stipules are lanceolate, acute; they fall soon after the leaf expands.

The flowers are pale to bright yellow, rarely orange or reddish, with four ribbon-shaped petals 1–2 cm (1/2–3/4 in) long and four short stamens, and grow in clusters; flowering begins in about mid-fall and continues until late fall. The floral calyx is imbricate in bud, deeply four-parted, very downy, and orange brown within. Two or three bractlets appear at base. The fruit is a hard woody capsule 10–14 mm (0.39–0.55 in) long, which splits explosively at the apex at maturity one year after pollination, ejecting the two shiny black seeds up to 10 m (33 ft) distant from the parent plant.

Hamamelis virginiana can be distinguished from the related Hamamelis vernalis by its flowering in fall, not winter.

== Ecology ==
Hamamelis virginiana flowers from late September to late November, occasionally in December. The pollinated ovary, protected by a persistent calyx, enters a resting state during the winter months. Fertilization of the ovary is delayed until the following spring, usually about the middle of May, which is 5–7 months after pollination. The fruits develop over the course of the growing season, reaching maturity in late August. As the ripe fruit dries and dehisces, the seeds are ballistically ejected, typically by late October. The empty seed pod remains attached to the plant, sometimes for months. The seeds lie on the ground for two winters before sprouting.

Hamamelis virginiana is a pollinator plant that attracts moths and supports 62 species of caterpillars.

== Uses ==
Native Americans produced witch hazel extract by boiling the stems of the shrub and producing a decoction, which was used to treat swellings, inflammations, and tumors. Early Puritan settlers in New England adopted this remedy from the natives, and its use became widely established in the United States.

An extract of the plant is used in the astringent witch hazel.

H. virginiana produces a specific kind of tannins called hamamelitannins. One of those substances displays a specific cytotoxic activity against colon cancer cells.

The bark and leaves were used by Native Americans in the treatment of external inflammations. Pond's Extract was a popular distillation of the bark in dilute alcohol.

The wood is light reddish brown, sapwood nearly white; heavy, hard, close-grained, with a density of 0.68.

The forked twigs of witch-hazel are preferred as divining rods.

The bark and leaves can be used to make tea for easing stomach issues, soothing sore throats, and more.

== Gallery ==
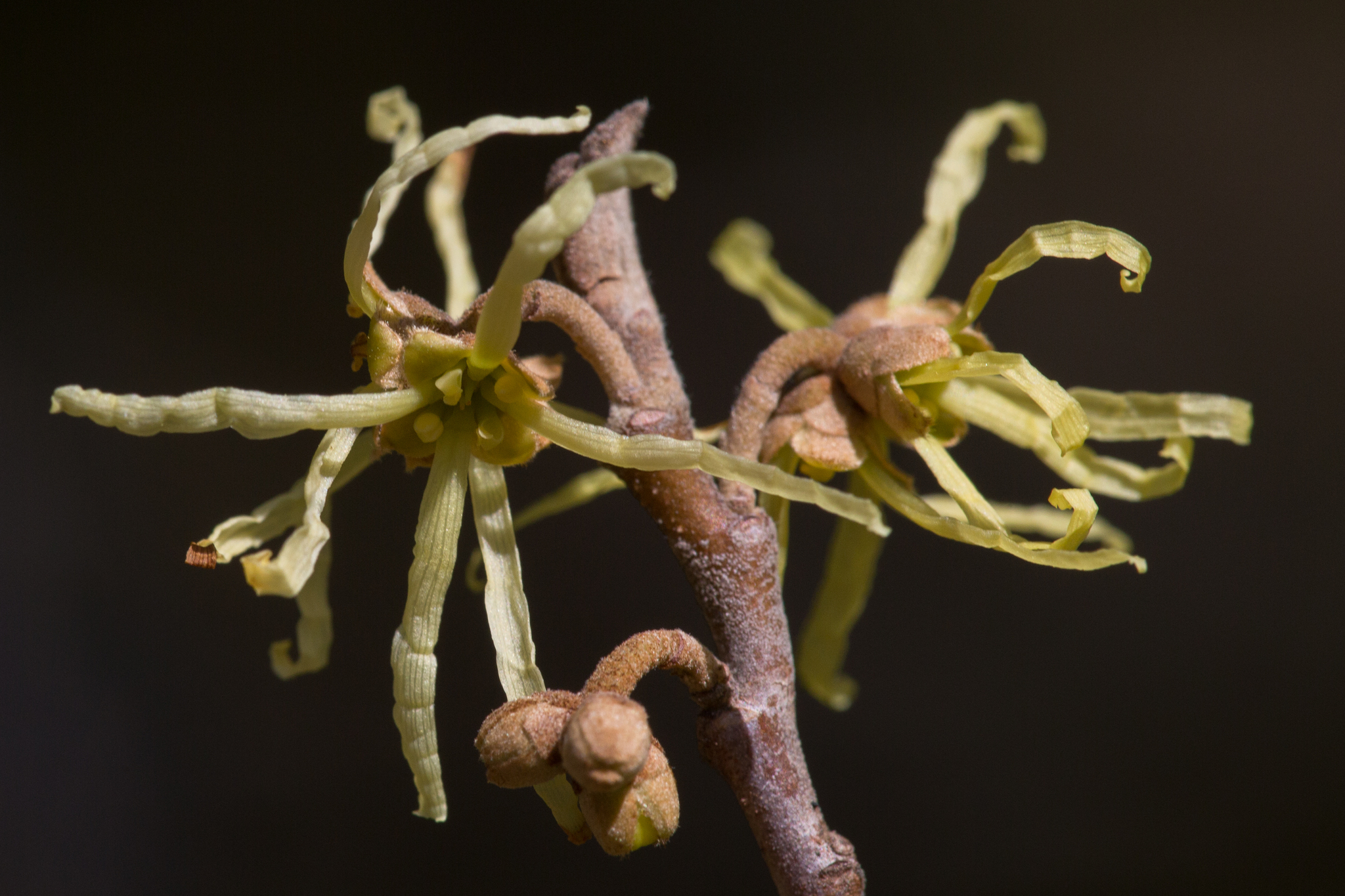
Flowers and flower buds in September

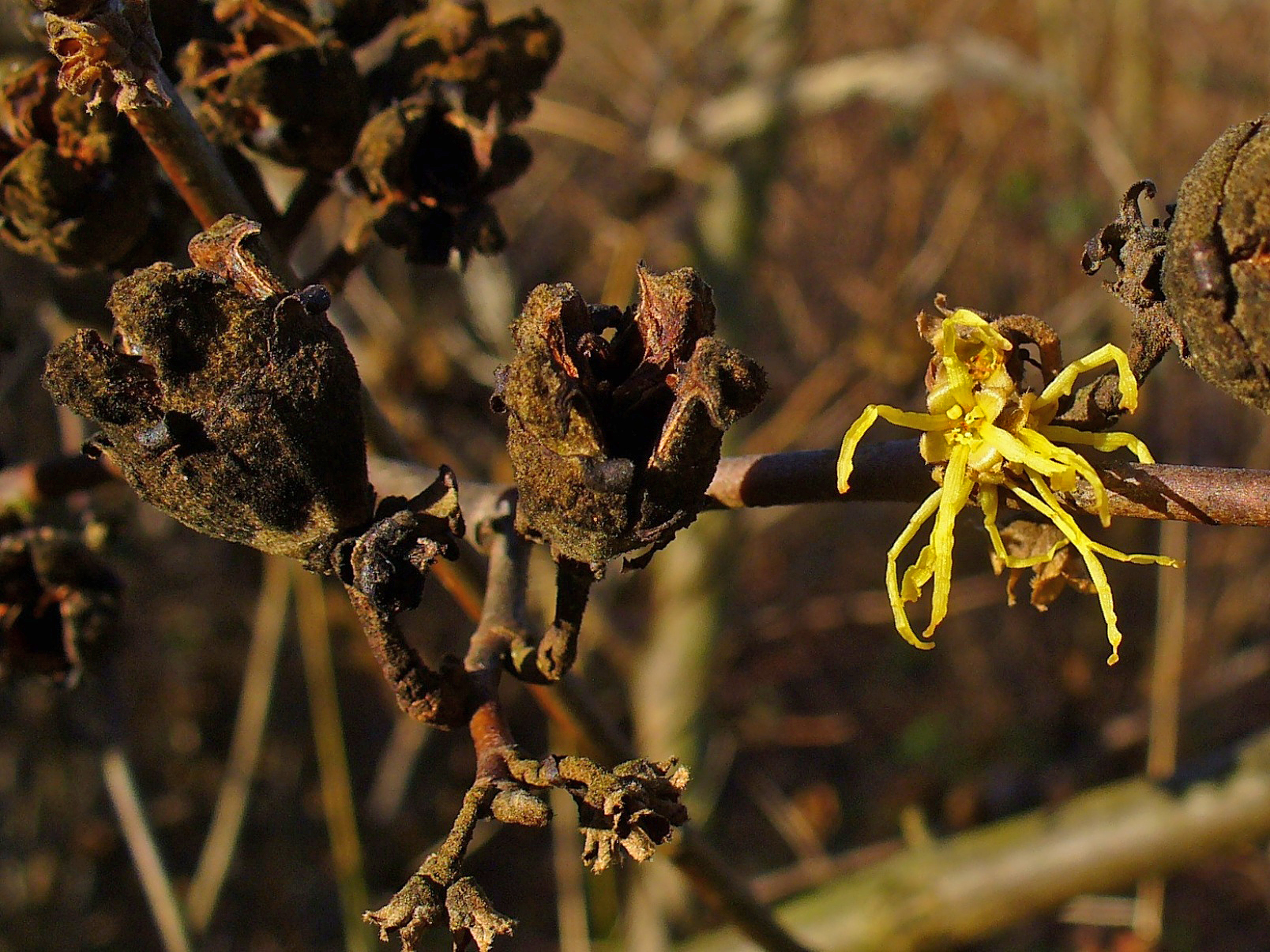
A lone flower in December, alongside empty persistent seed pods

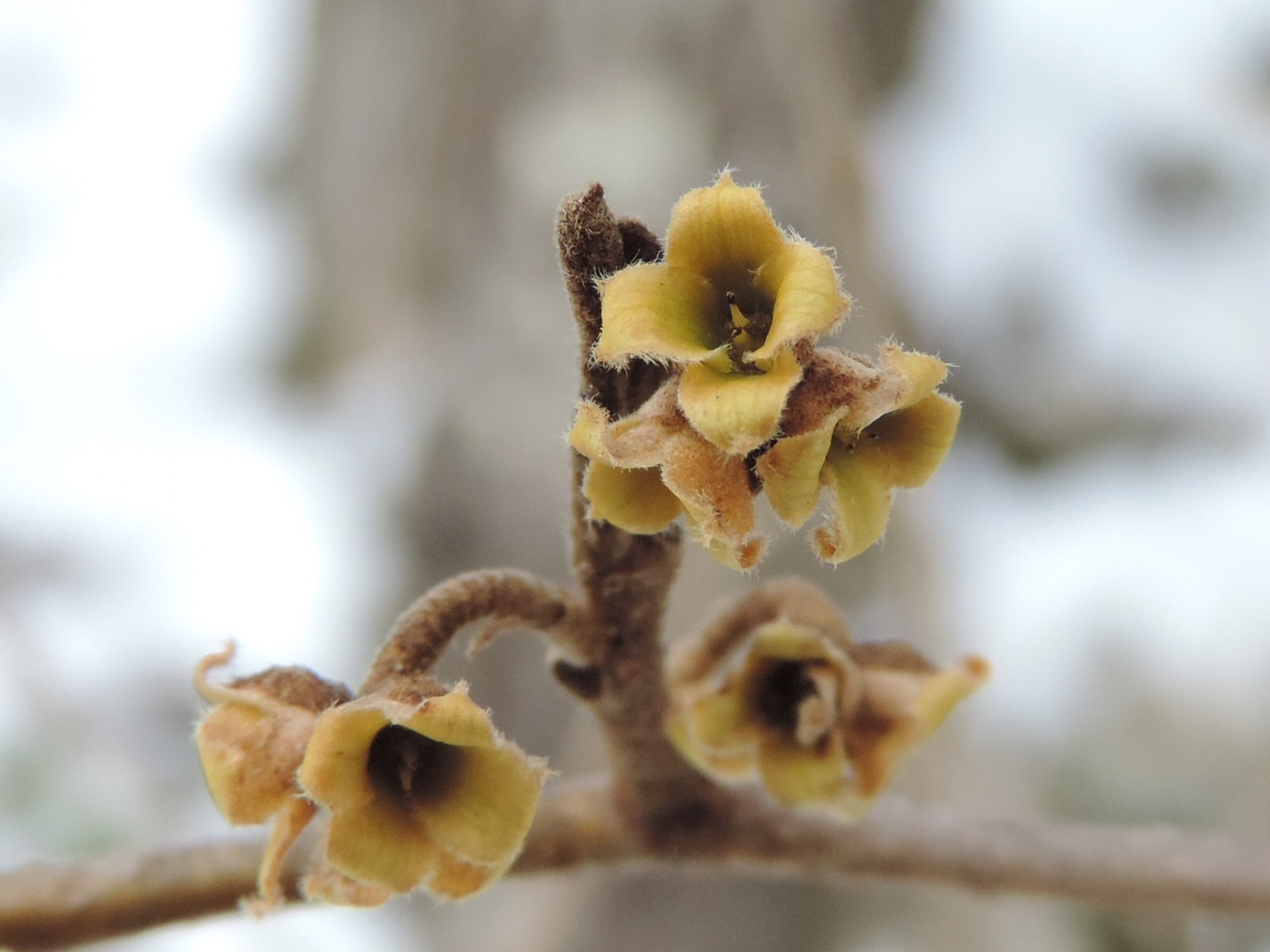
Close-up of persistent calyces in January

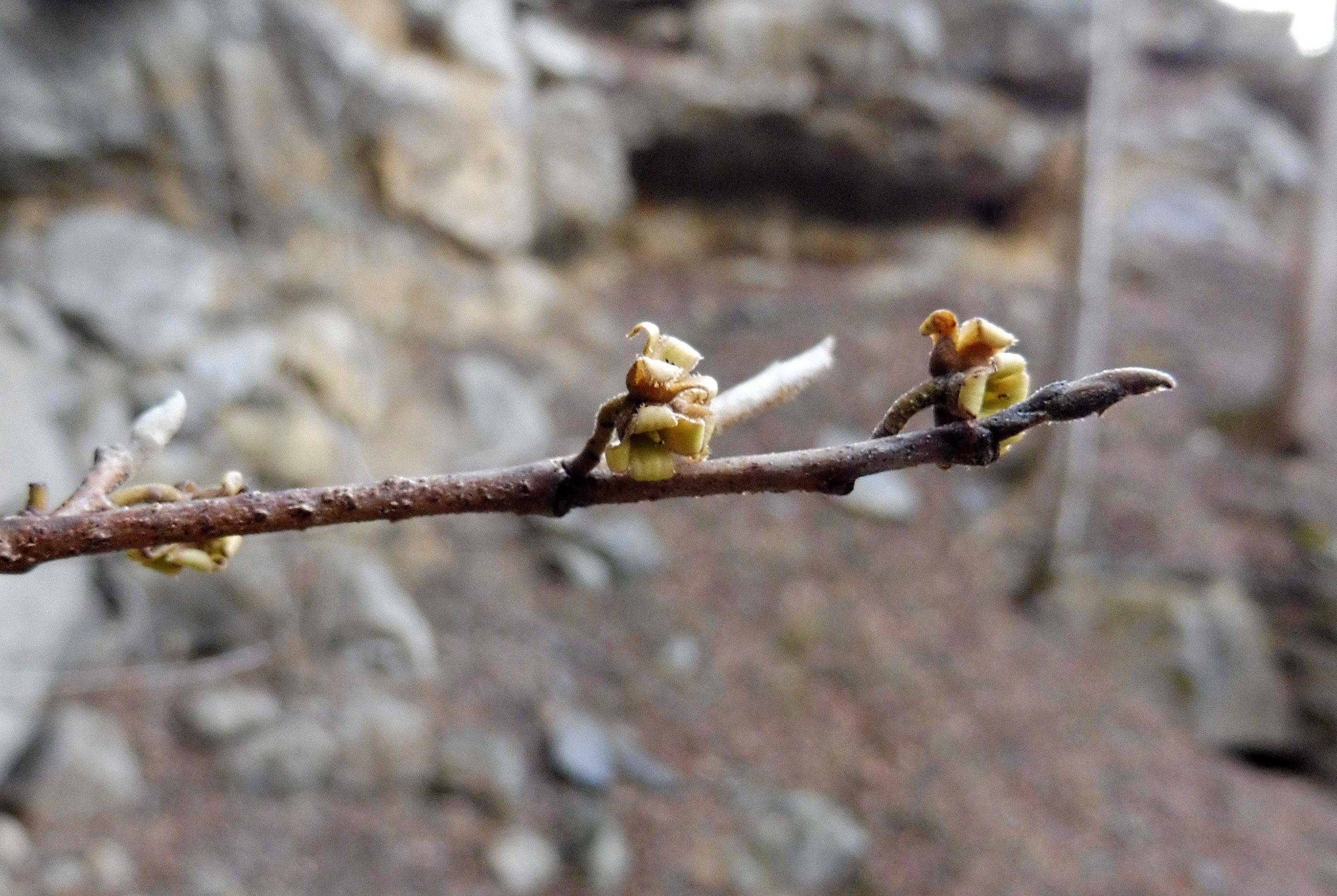
Winter twig in March, with brown-pubescent terminal bud and persistent calyces

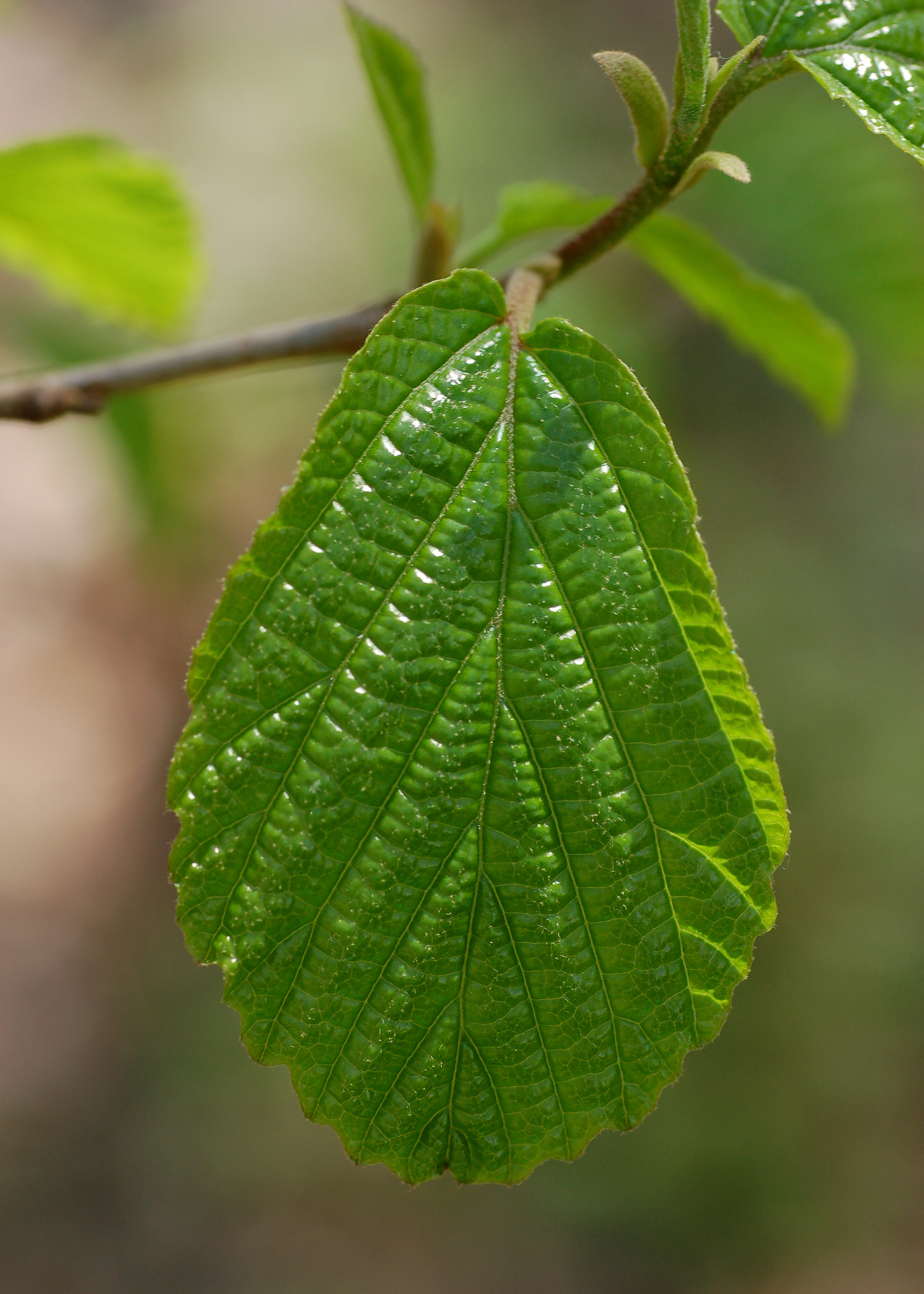
Leafing out in April

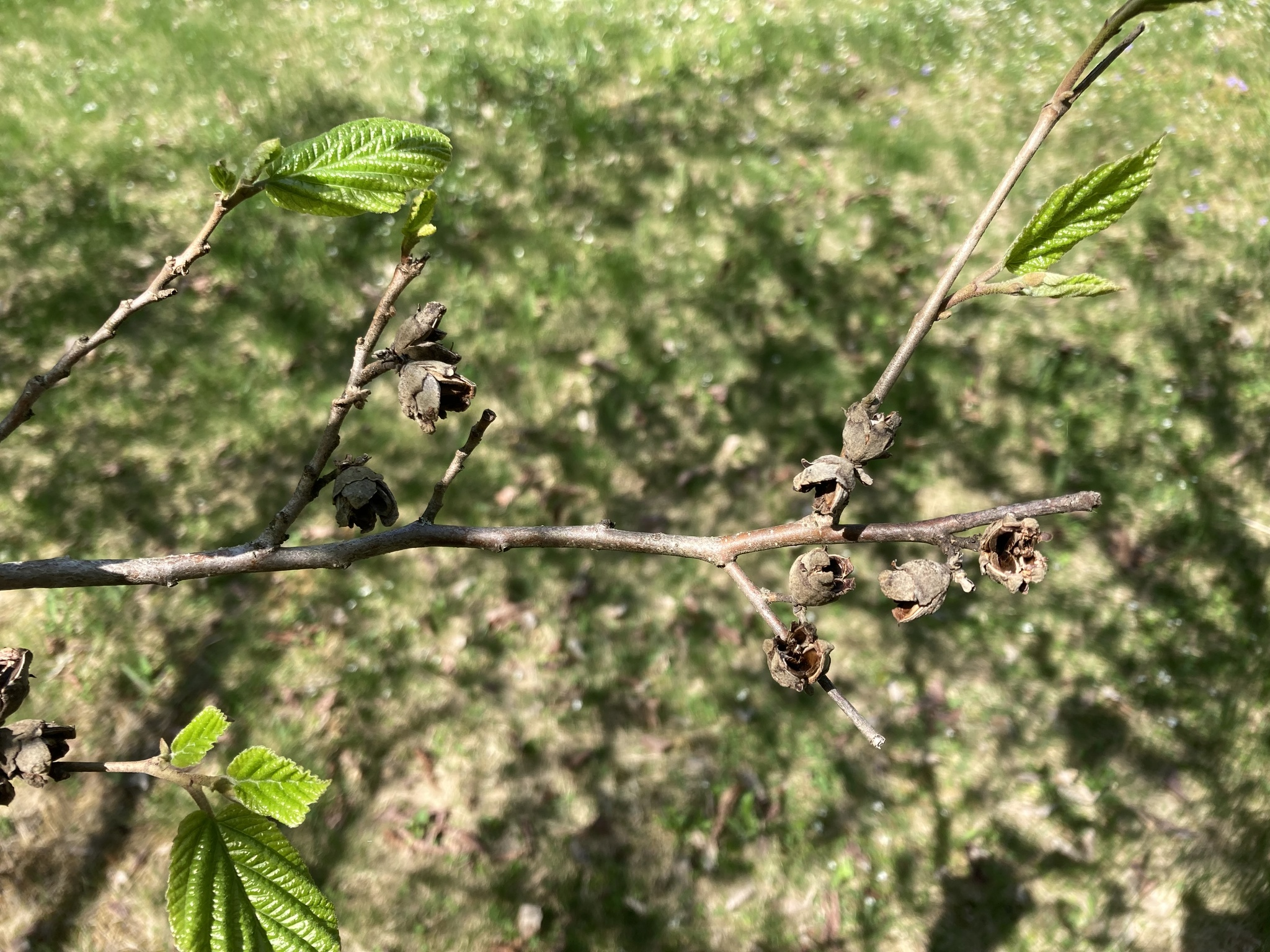
Empty seed pods in May, at least six months after seed dispersal

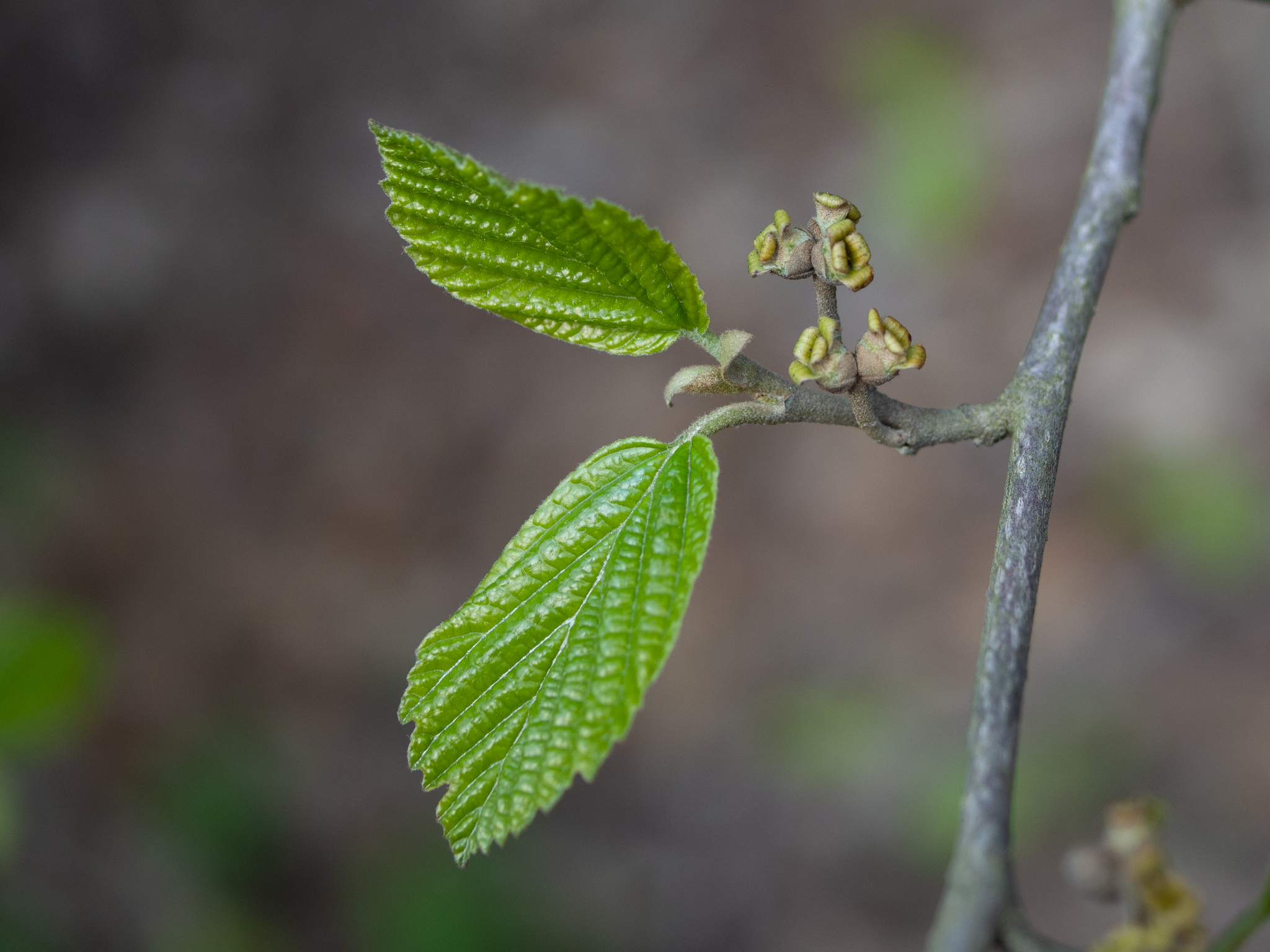
New fruits in May. These are the fruits of flowers that bloomed during the previous autumn.

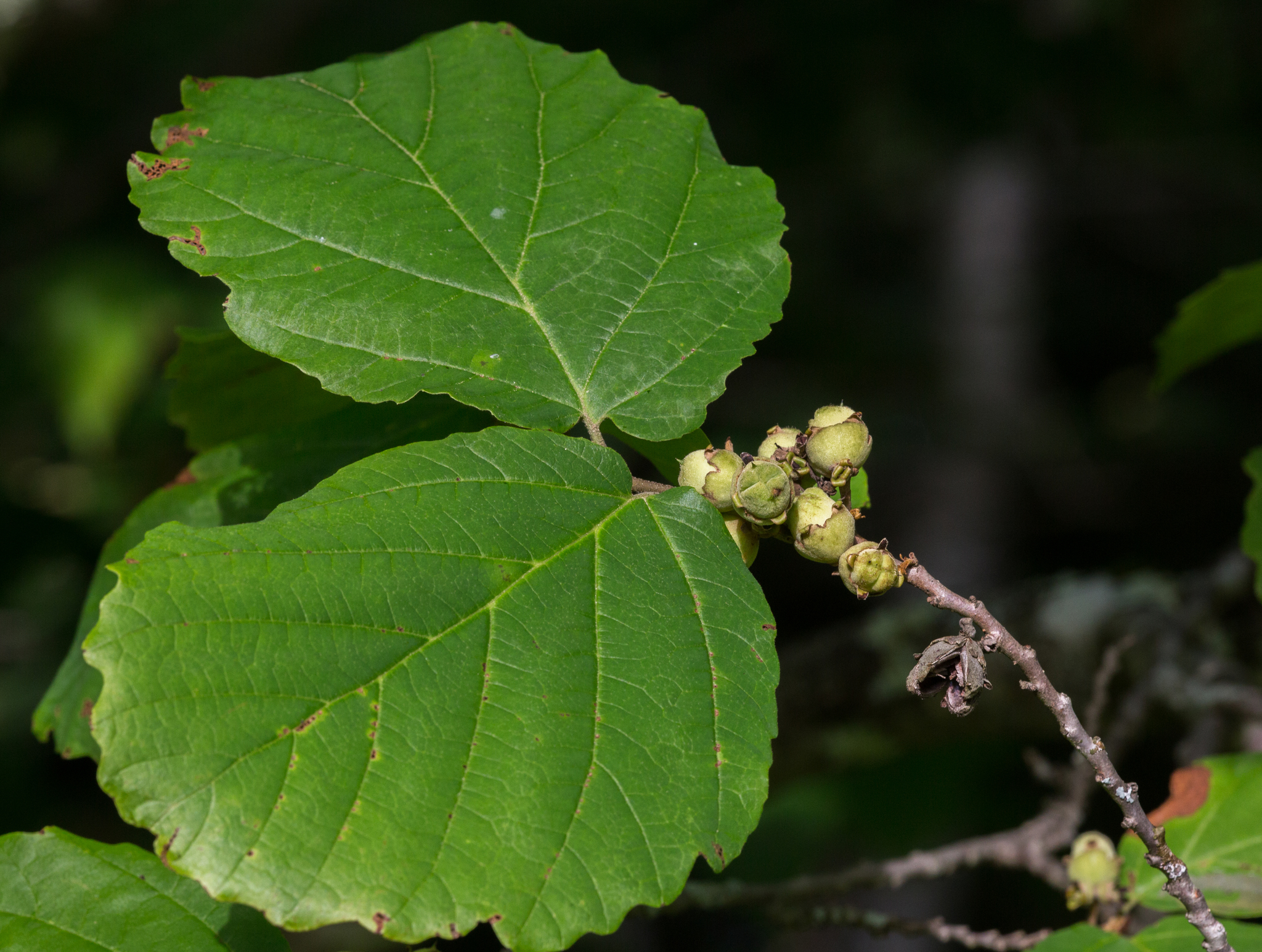
Developing fruits in July. The empty seed pod is persistent from the fruit of a flower that bloomed almost two years earlier.

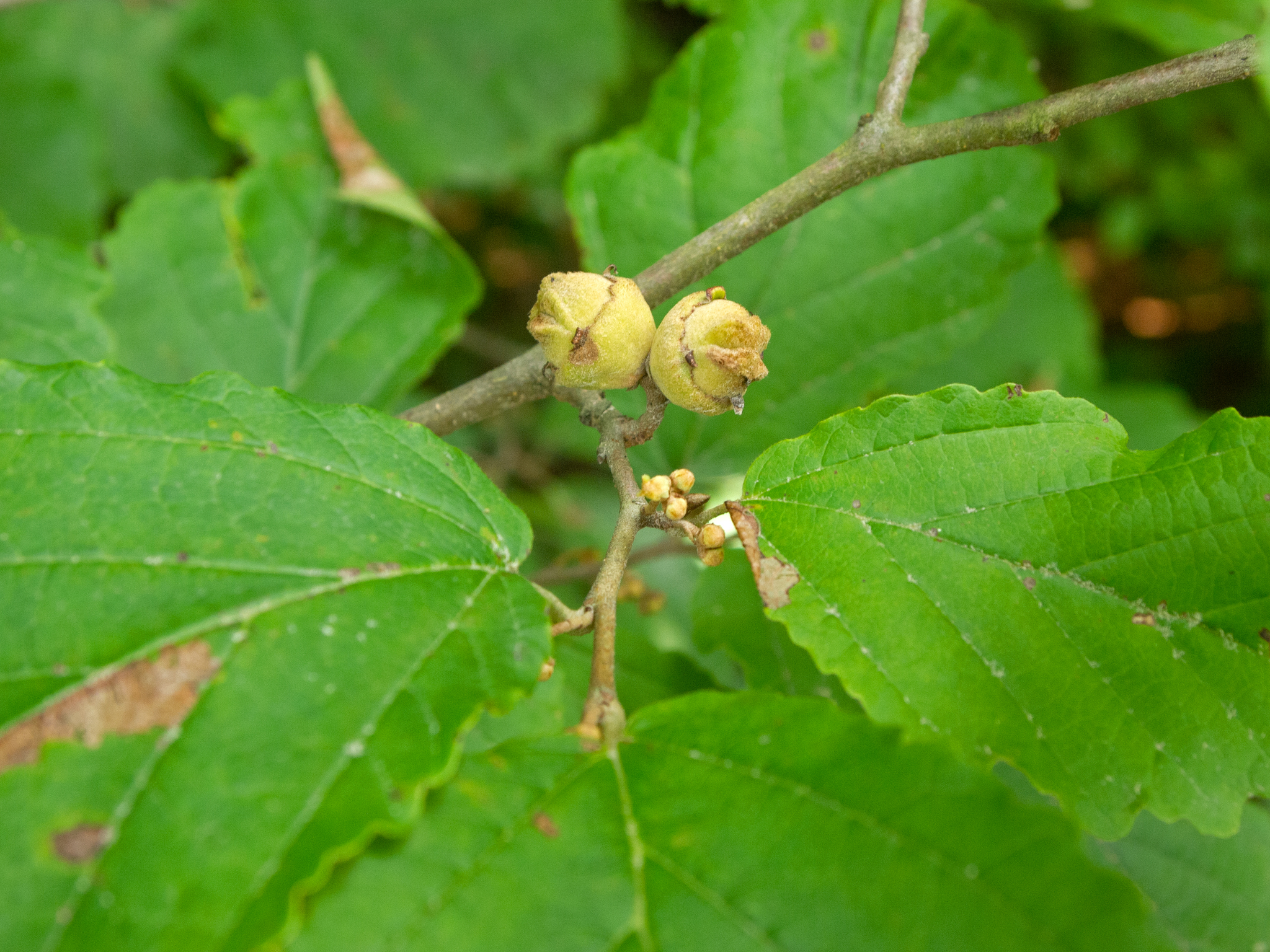
Ripening fruits (above) and flower buds (below) in August

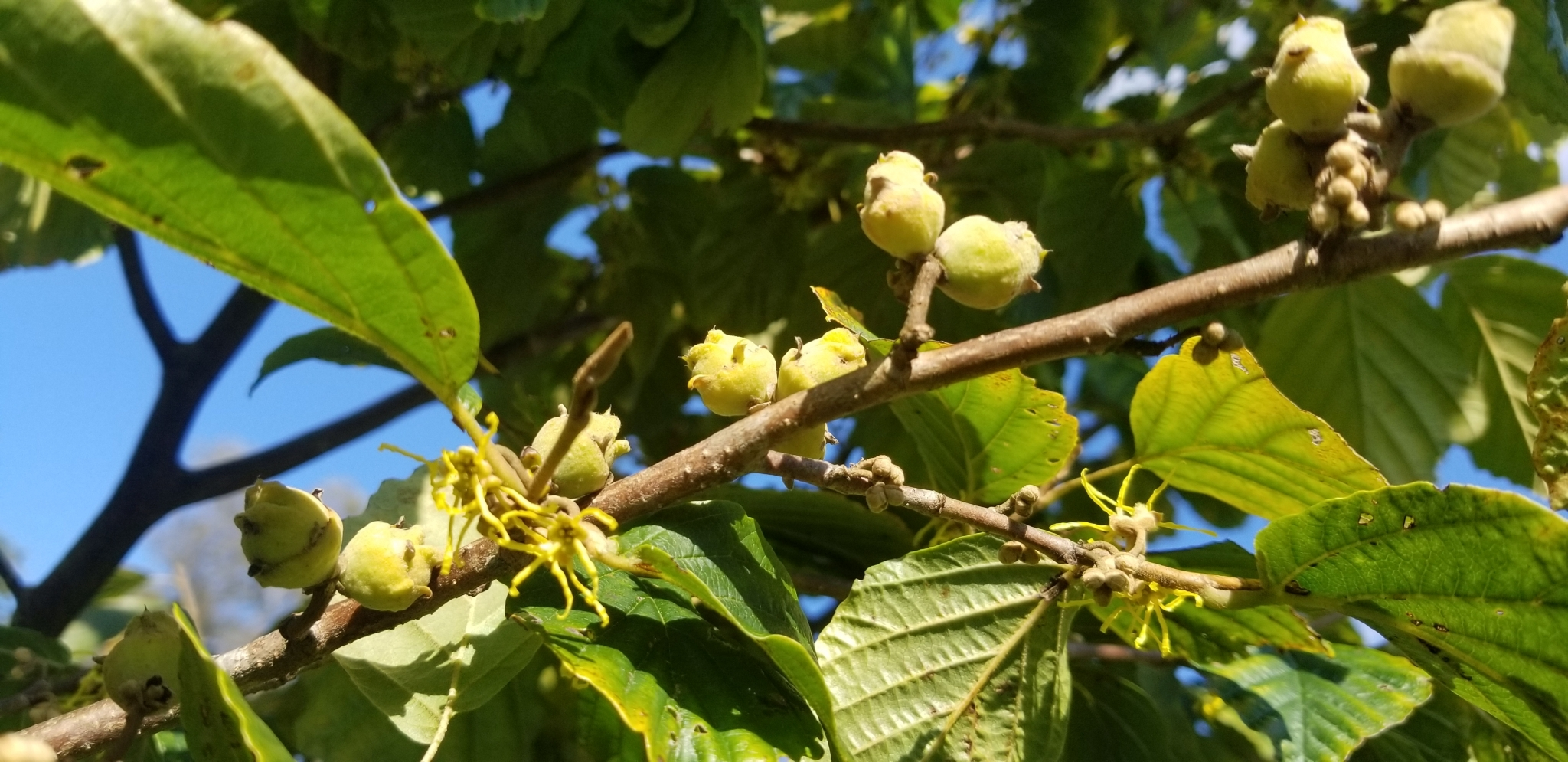
Flowers, flower buds, and ripe fruits in October

== Bibliography ==
- Anderson, Gregory J.; Hill, James D. (2002). "Many to flower, few to fruit: the reproductive biology of Hamamelis virginiana (Hamamelidaceae)". American Journal of Botany. 89 (1): 67–78. doi:10.3732/ajb.89.1.67. PMID 21669713.
- Shoemaker, D. N. (1905). "On the development of Hamamelis virginiana". Botanical Gazette. 39 (4): 248–266. doi:10.1086/328615. S2CID 85158182.
