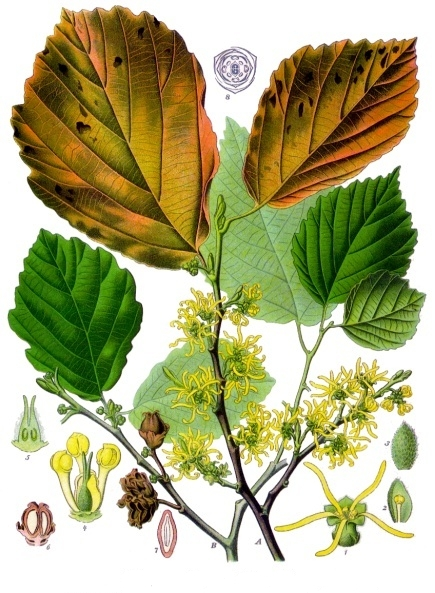
- Hamamelis virginiana

Scientific classification
- Kingdom: Plantae
- Clade: Embryophytes
- Clade: Tracheophytes
- Clade: Spermatophytes
- Clade: Angiosperms
- Clade: Eudicots
- Order: Saxifragales
- Family: Hamamelidaceae
- Subfamily: Hamamelidoideae
- Tribe: Hamamelideae; A.DC.
- Genus: Hamamelis; Gronov. ex L.

Type species
- Hamamelis virginiana L.

Synonyms
- Lomilis Raf.; Trilopus Adans.

= Witch-hazel =

Genus of plants

Witch-hazels or witch hazels (Hamamelis) are a genus of flowering plants in the family Hamamelidaceae, with three species in North America (H. ovalis, H. virginiana, and H. vernalis), and one each in Japan (H. japonica) and China (H. mollis). The North American species are occasionally called winterbloom.

== Description ==
The witch-hazels are deciduous shrubs or (rarely) small trees growing to 3 to 7.5 m tall, even more rarely to 12 m tall. The leaves are alternately arranged, oval, 5 to 15 cm long, and 2.5 to 10 cm wide, with a smooth or wavy margin. The genus name, Hamamelis, means "together with fruit", referring to the simultaneous occurrence of flowers with the maturing fruit from the previous year. H. virginiana blooms in September–November while the other species bloom from January–March. Each flower has four slender strap-shaped petals 1 to 2 cm long, pale to dark yellow, orange, or red. The fruit is a two-part capsule 1 cm long, containing a single 0.6 cm glossy black seed in each of the two parts; the capsule splits explosively at maturity in the autumn about eight months after flowering, ejecting the seeds with sufficient force to fly for distances of up to 12 feet (3.7 m), thus another alternative name "snapping hazel".

== Etymology ==
The name witch in witch-hazel has its origins in Middle English wiche, from the Old English wice, meaning "pliant" or "bendable", and is not related to the word witch meaning a practitioner of magic. Jacob George Strutt's 1822 book, Sylva Britannica attests that "Wych Hazel" was used in England as a synonym for wych elm, the entirely unrelated Ulmus glabra. The use of the twigs as divining rods, just as hazel twigs were used in England, may also have, by folk etymology, influenced the "witch" part of the name.

== Species ==
Five species are recognized:

- Hamamelis japonica Siebold & Zucc. – Japanese witch-hazel
- Hamamelis mollis Oliv. – Chinese witch hazel
- Hamamelis ovalis S.W.Leonard – big-leaf witch-hazel
- Hamamelis vernalis Sarg. – Ozark witchhazel
- Hamamelis virginiana L. – common witch-hazel or American witch-hazel

Hamamelis mexicana is sometimes considered a species, though as of 2020 Kew's Plants of the World Online considers it a variety of H. virginiana.

The Persian ironwood, a closely related tree formerly treated as Hamamelis persica, is now given a genus of its own, as Parrotia persica, as it differs in the flowers having just sepals and no petals. Other closely allied genera are Parrotiopsis, Fothergilla, and Sycopsis (see under Hamamelidaceae). Witch-hazels are not closely related to the true Corylus hazels, though they have a few superficially similar characteristics which may cause one to believe that they are - their leaves are a similar shape, and turn a similar shade of yellow in autumn.

== Cultivation ==
They are popular ornamental plants, grown for their clusters of rich yellow to orange-red flowers, which begin to expand in the autumn as or slightly before the leaves fall and continue throughout the winter.

=== Garden shrubs ===
Hamamelis virginiana was introduced into English gardens by Peter Collinson, who maintained correspondence with plant hunters in the American colonies. It is rarely seen in the nursery trade except for woodland/wildlife restoration projects and native plant enthusiasts. Much more common is H. mollis, which has bright yellow flowers that bloom in late winter instead of the yellow blossoms of H. virginiana which tend to be lost among the plant's fall foliage. The plant-hunter Charles Maries collected for Veitch Nurseries in the Chinese district of Jiujiang in 1879. It languished in nursery rows for years until it was noticed, propagated, and put on the market in 1902.

Numerous cultivars have been selected for use as garden shrubs, many of them derived from the hybrid H. × intermedia Rehder (H. japonica × H. mollis). Jelena and Robert de Belder of Arboretum Kalmthout, selecting for red cultivars, found three: the first, with bronze flowers, was named 'Jelena'; the next, with red flowers, was named 'Diane' (the name of their daughter); the last, with deep red flowers, was called 'Livia' (the name of their granddaughter).

== Phytochemicals and hamamelis water ==
The main phytochemicals in witch-hazel leaves are polyphenols, including 3–10% tannins, flavonoids, and up to 0.5% essential oil, while the bark has a higher tannin content. Hamamelis water, also called white hazel or witch hazel water prepared from a steam-distillation process using leaves, bark or twigs, is a clear, colorless liquid containing 13–15% ethanol having the odor of the essential oil, but with no tannins present. Essential oil components, such as carvacrol and eugenol, may be present.

As an ingredient and topical agent, witch-hazel water is regulated in the United States as an over-the-counter drug for external use only to soothe minor skin irritations. Hamamelis (witch-hazel) water is diluted using water in a 1:3 preparation, and is not intended for oral use which may cause nausea, vomiting, or constipation.

=== Topical ointment ===
Witch-hazel may be sold as a semisolid ointment, cream, gel, or salve for topical use, and due to its astringent and antiseptic properties, has long been used to treat various skin conditions like acne. The ointment may ease discomfort from post-partum vaginal soreness and hemorrhoids. It is commonly used to treat diaper rash in infants, and may reduce symptoms of inflammation from minor skin injuries. A 2012 review (updated in October 2020) found little evidence of effectiveness from local cooling treatments (including witch-hazel pads) applied to the perineum following childbirth to relieve pain.

== Folk medicine ==
The leaves and bark of the North American witch-hazel, Hamamelis virginiana, are used in folk medicine, herbalism, and skincare decoctions by Native Americans. Extracts of witch-hazel have been claimed to be effective for psoriasis and eczema, to prevent dehydration of skin, and for insect bites, poison ivy, and razor burn. There is limited clinical evidence to support witch-hazel as an effective treatment for any of these conditions. Prepared by distillation, the essential oil of witch-hazel has such a small proportion of tannins or other polyphenols that it is unlikely to have any therapeutic effect, and may cause contact dermatitis when used topically. It might be useful in treating hemorrhoids and relieving some of its symptoms, although more research is needed.

In 2017, one manufacturer of skin care products containing witch-hazel was warned by the Food and Drug Administration for making unsubstantiated health claims and for not providing evidence the products were safe.

In a 2002 human study, researchers found that lotion with 10 percent witch hazel decreased reddening due to a sunburn. A 1998 study determined similar results in people with sunburns.

=== History ===
Early Puritan settlers in New England learned about witch-hazel from the Native peoples, but its use did not become widely established in the United States until the 19th century.

A missionary, Dr. Charles Hawes, adopted the process of steam distillation of witch-hazel twigs, creating a "Hawes Extract" product sold in Essex, Connecticut, in 1846, by Alvan Whittemore, a druggist and chemist. Thomas Newton Dickinson Sr. is credited with starting the commercial production of witch-hazel extract in 1866, and eventually establishing nine production sites in eastern Connecticut during the 20th century. Following his death, his two sons, Thomas N. Dickinson Jr., of Mystic, Connecticut, and Everett E. Dickinson of Essex, each inherited parts of the family business and continued the manufacture of witch-hazel extract, operating competing "Dickinson's" businesses that their descendants continued until 1997, when the manufacturing operations from both companies were consolidated at the American Distilling plant in East Hampton, CT.

In 1846, Theron T. Pond marketed a similar product, Golden Treasure, extracted from witch hazel bark. After Pond died in 1852, it was marketed as Pond's Extract, the first product of the Pond's firm, today a maker of a range of toiletries sold worldwide.

== Gallery ==
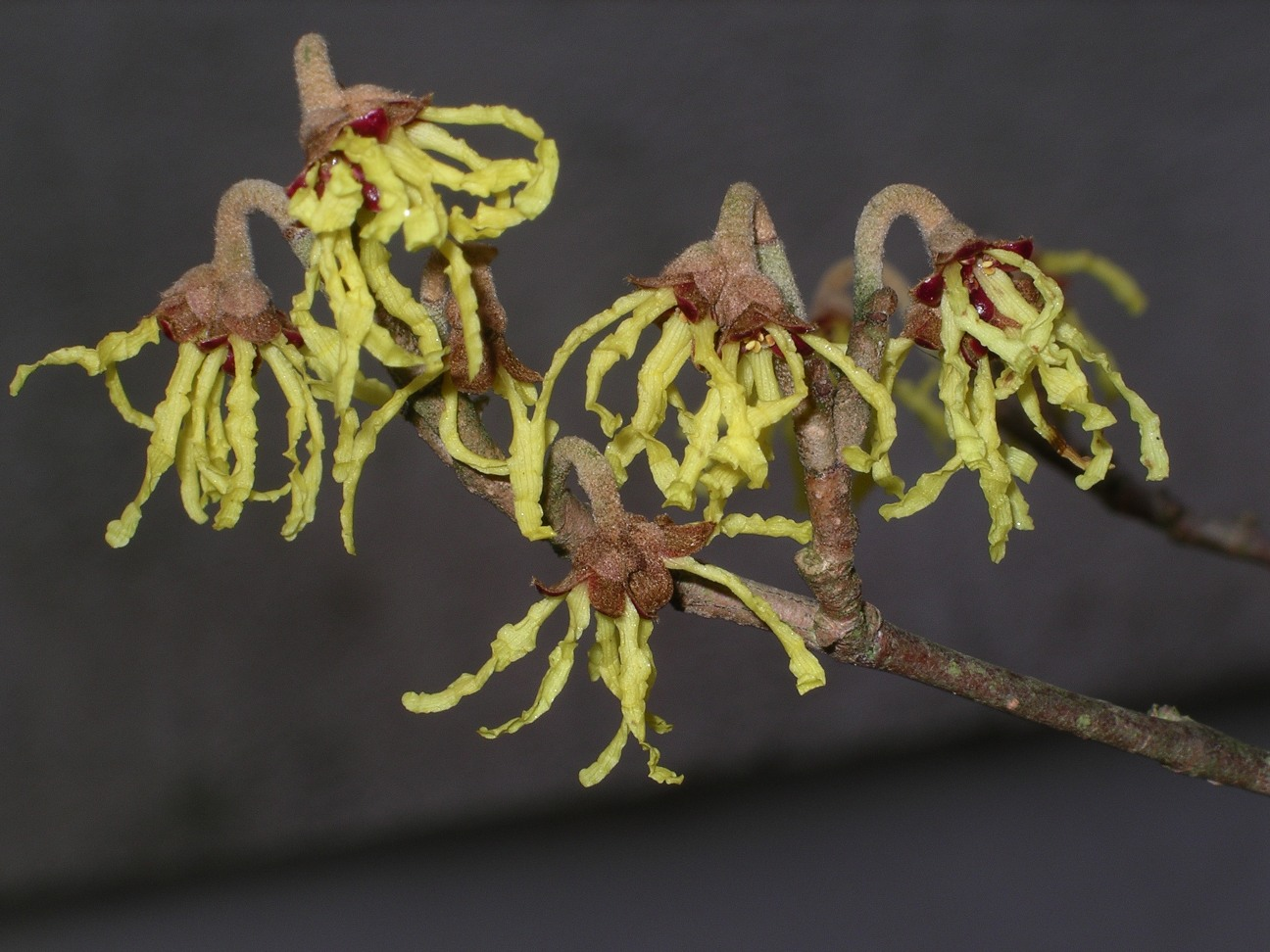
Hamamelis flowers, Menai Bridge, Wales

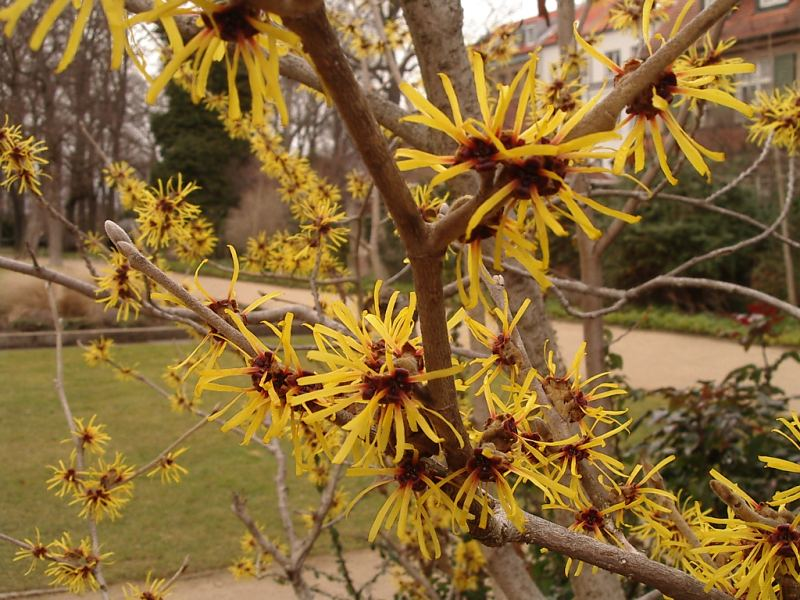
Hamamelis, Fürth City Park, Germany

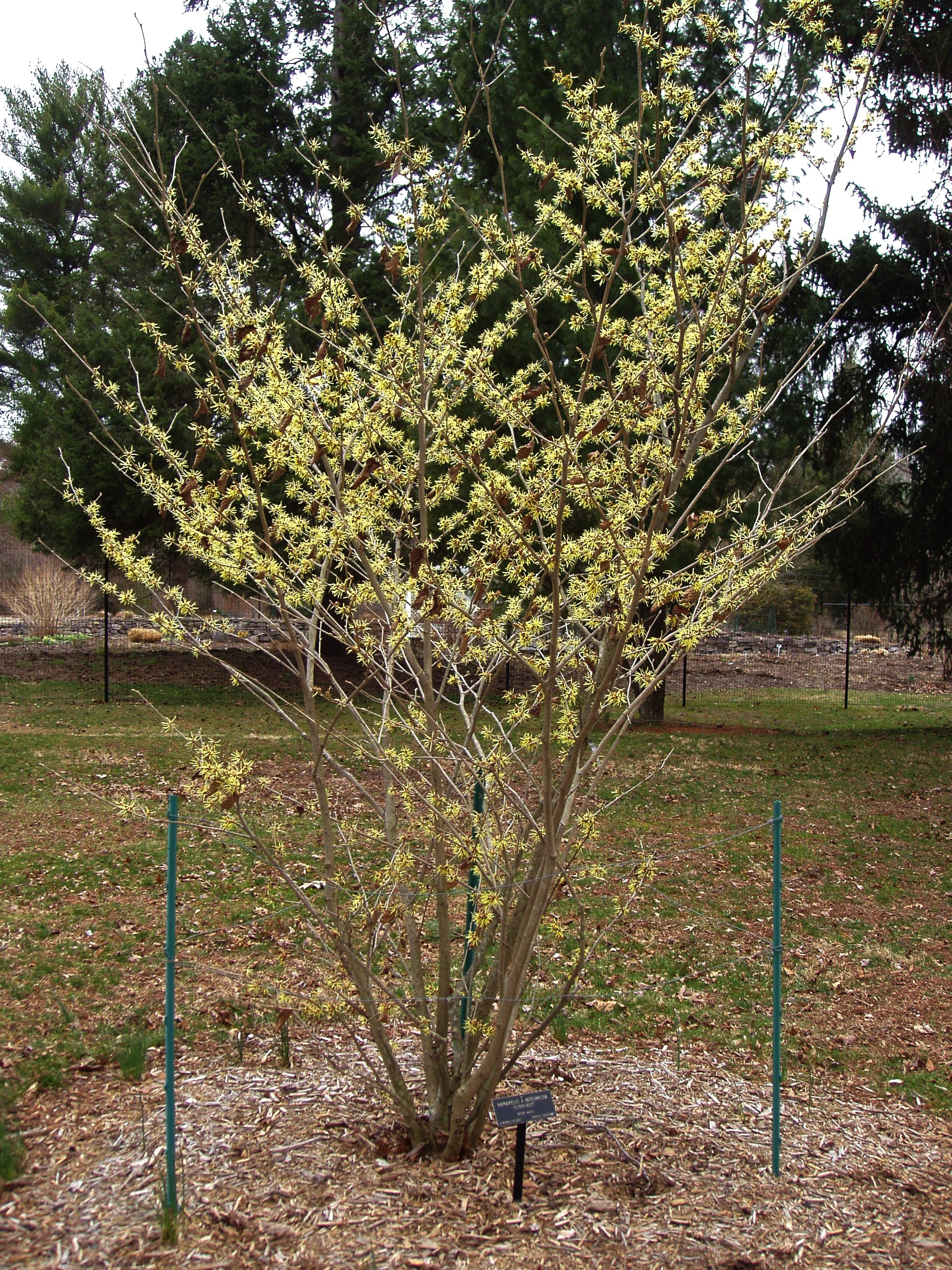
Hamamelis, Colonial Park Arboretum and Gardens

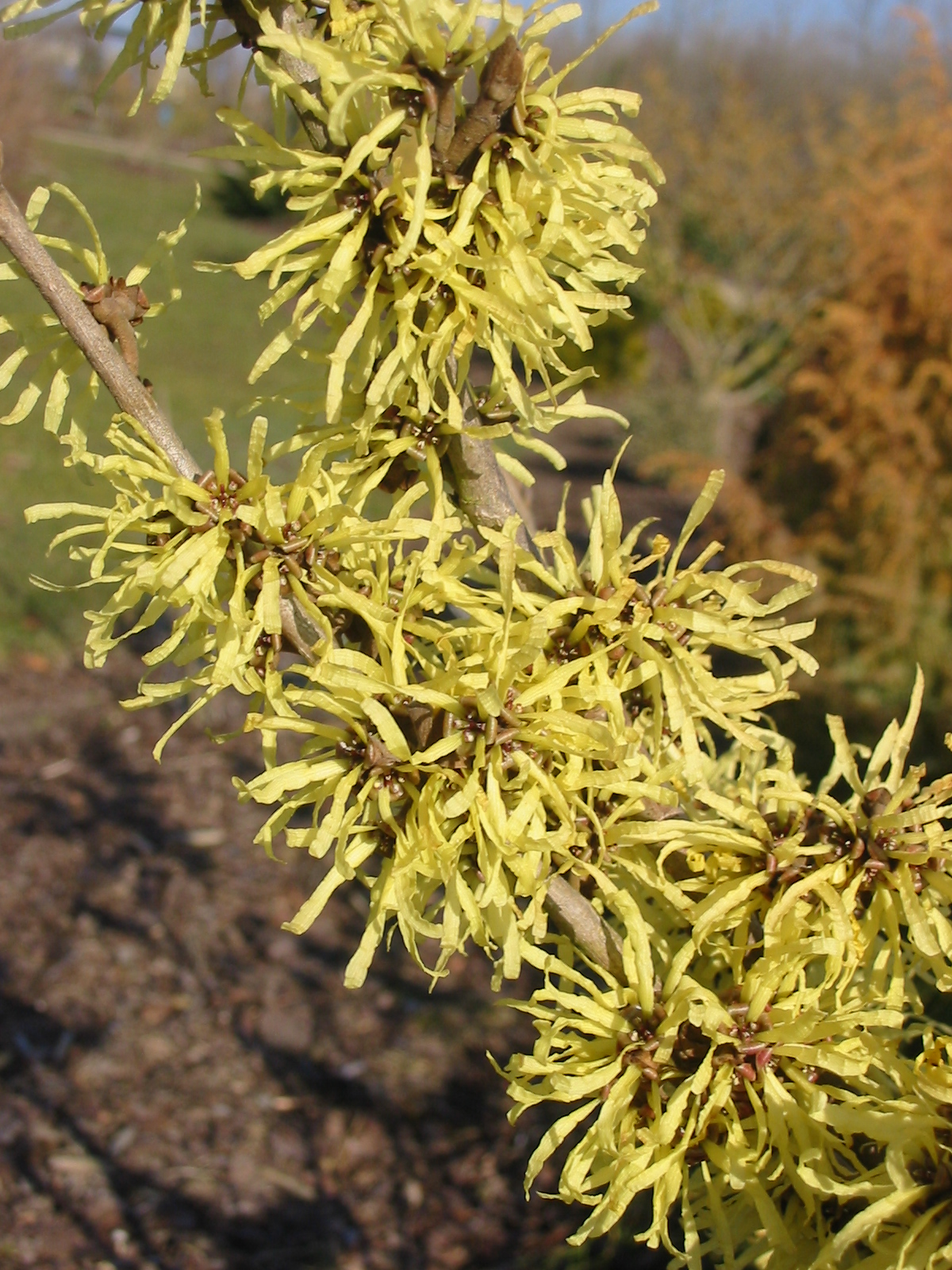
H. × intermedia

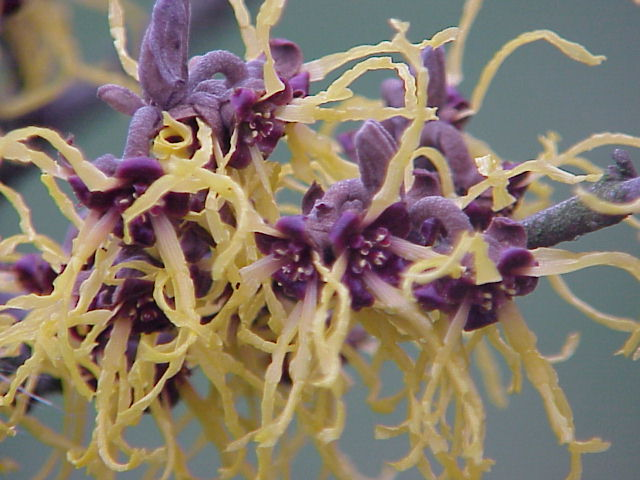
Hamamelis japonica close-up flowers

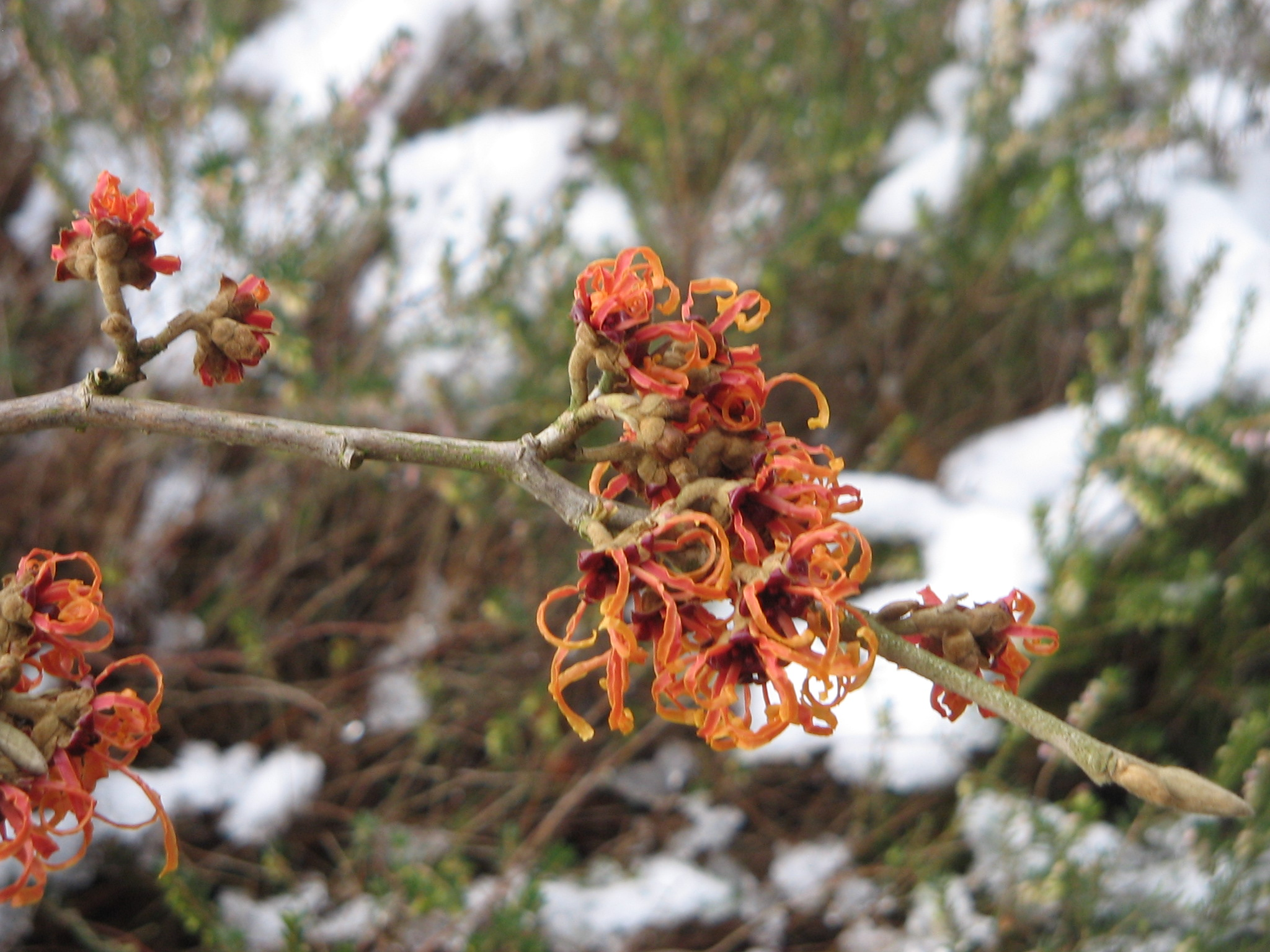
H. × intermedia 'Jelena'

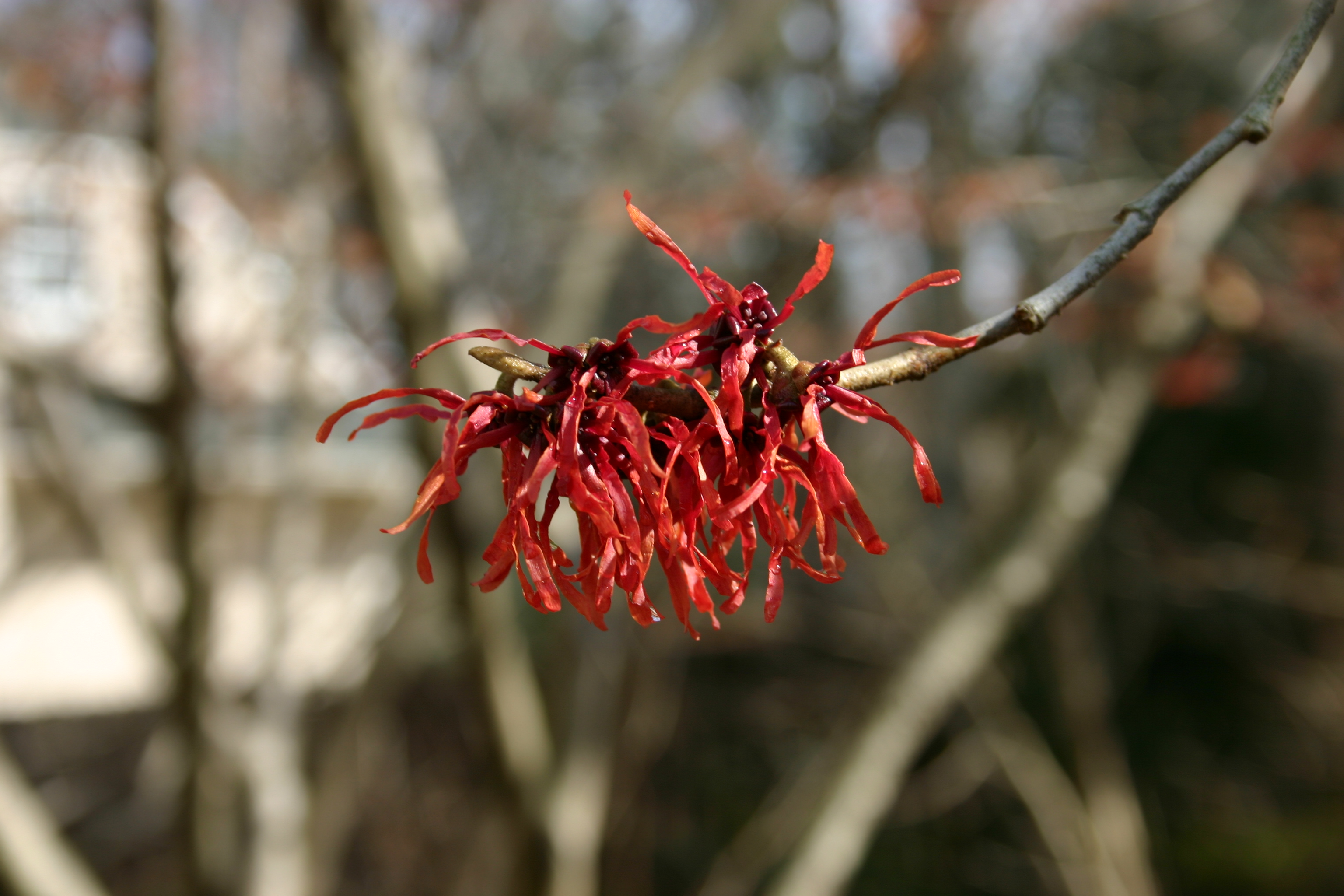
H. × intermedia 'Diane'

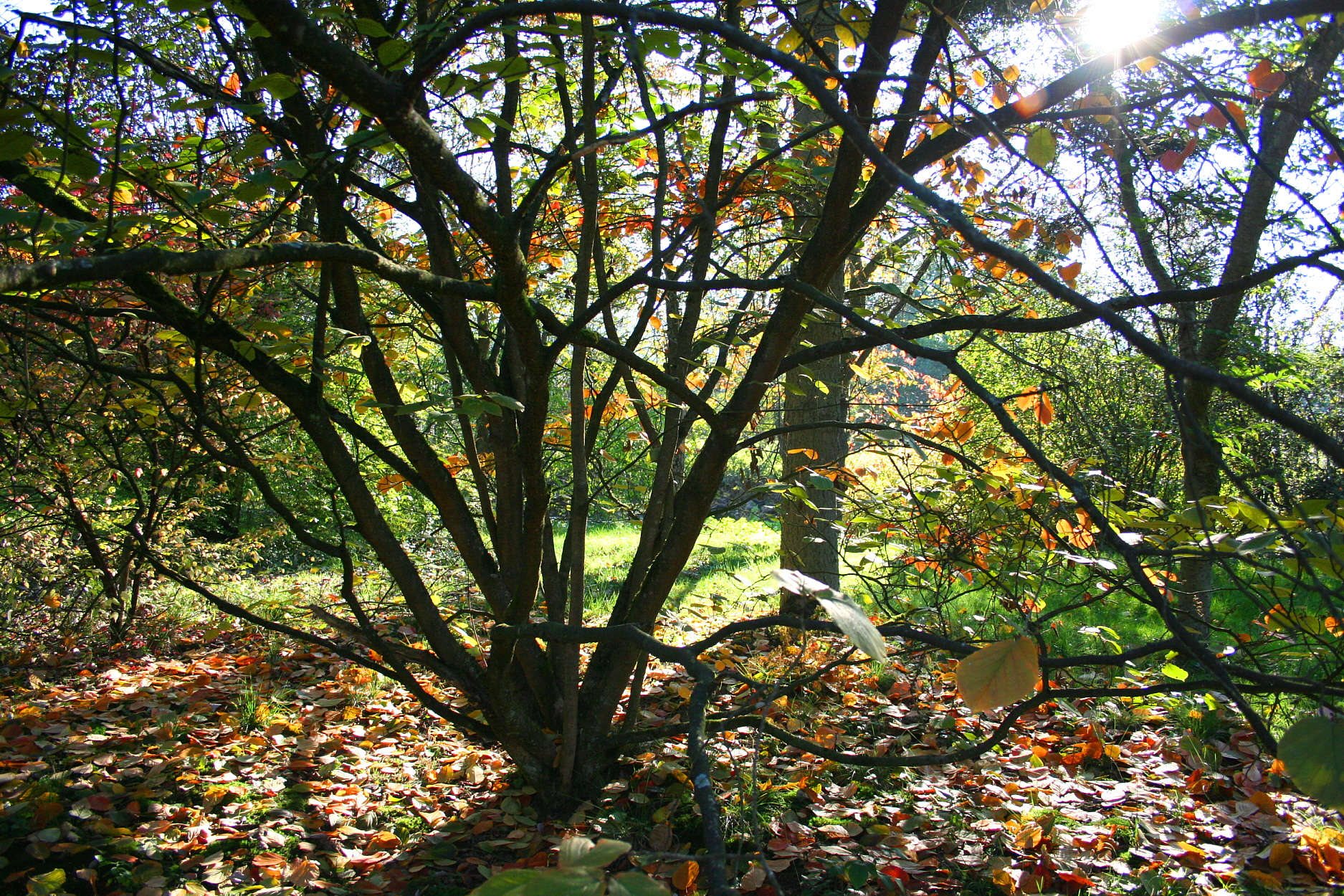
Hamamelis mollis tree in autumn

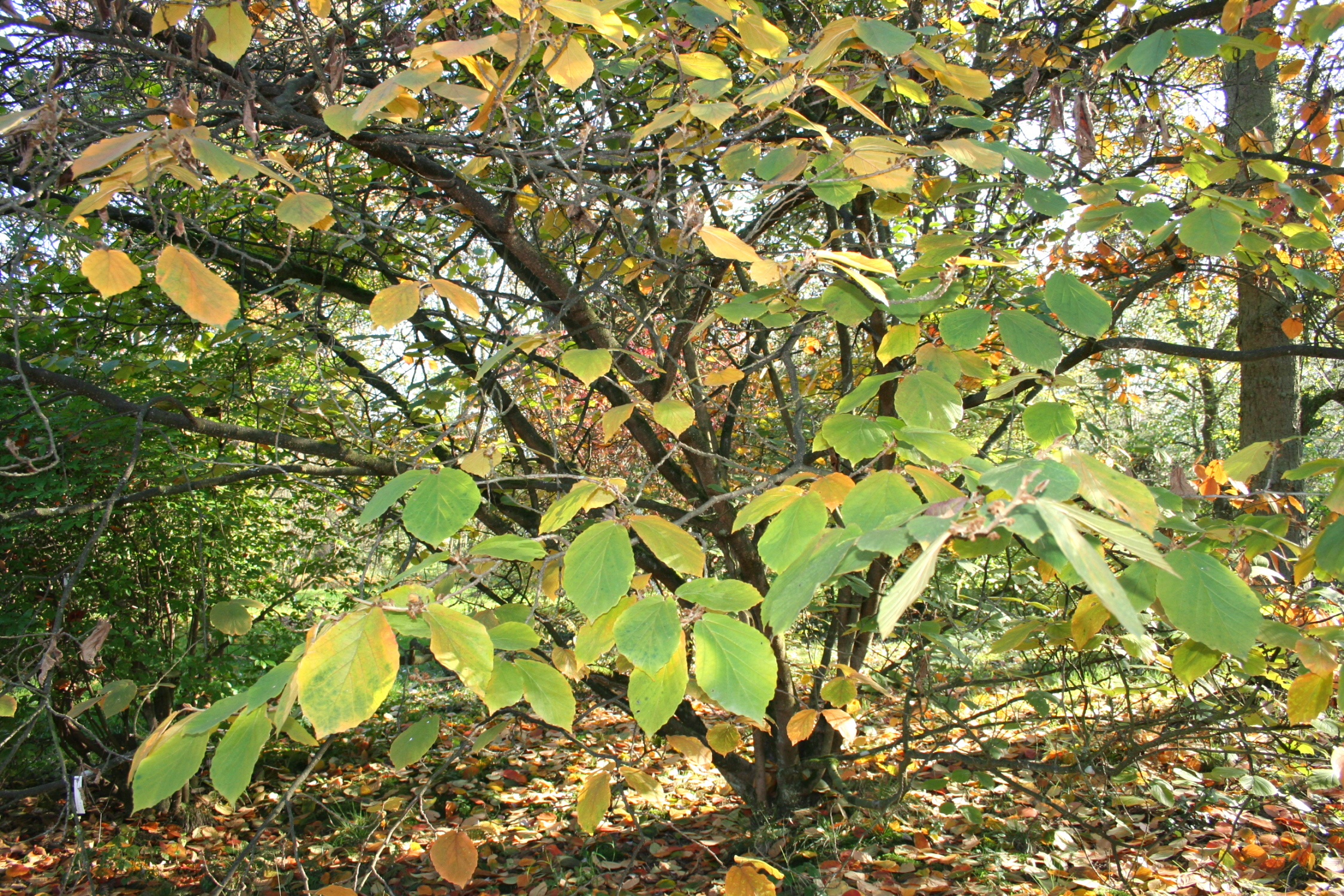
Hamamelis mollis in autumn

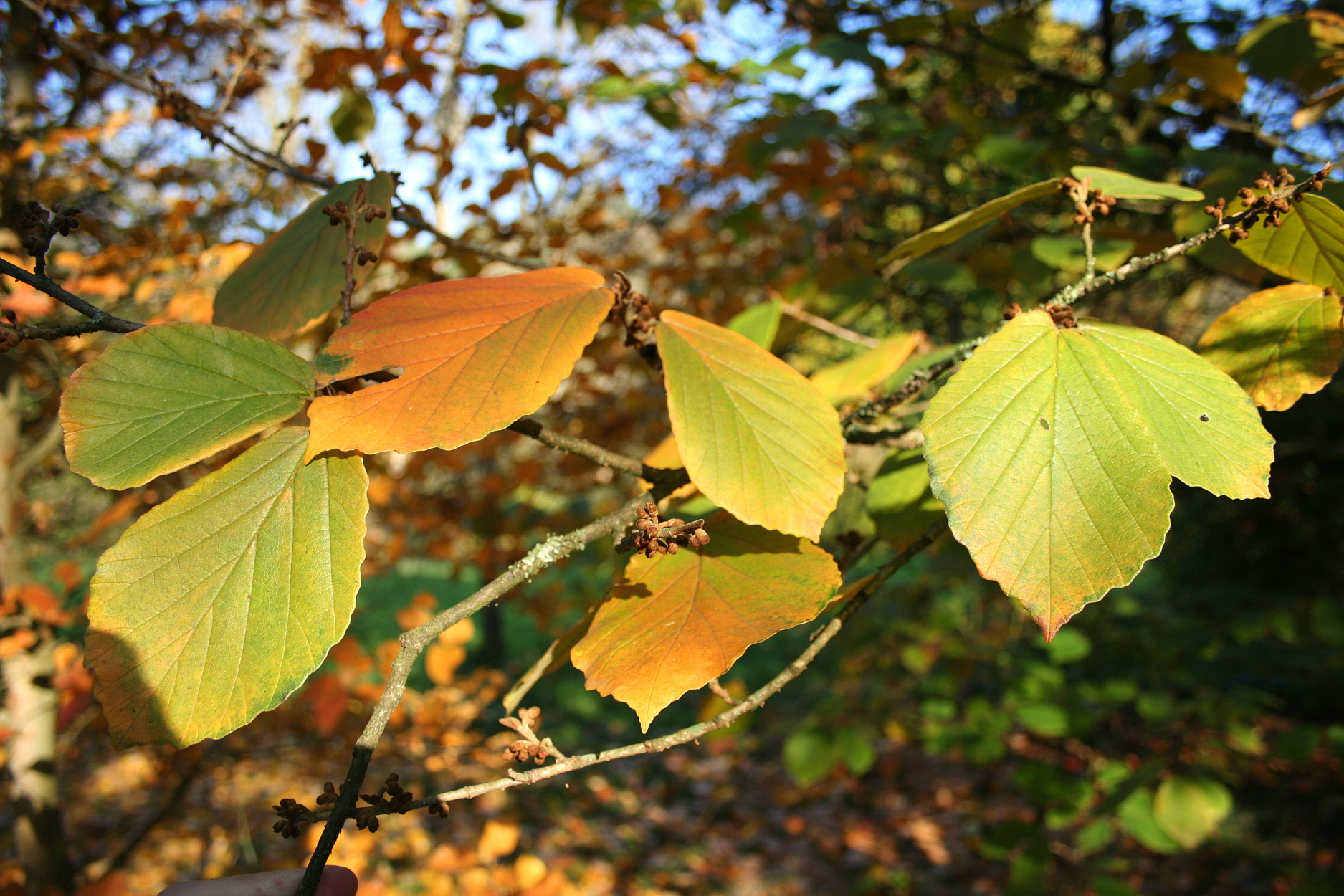
Hamamelis mollis leaves in autumn

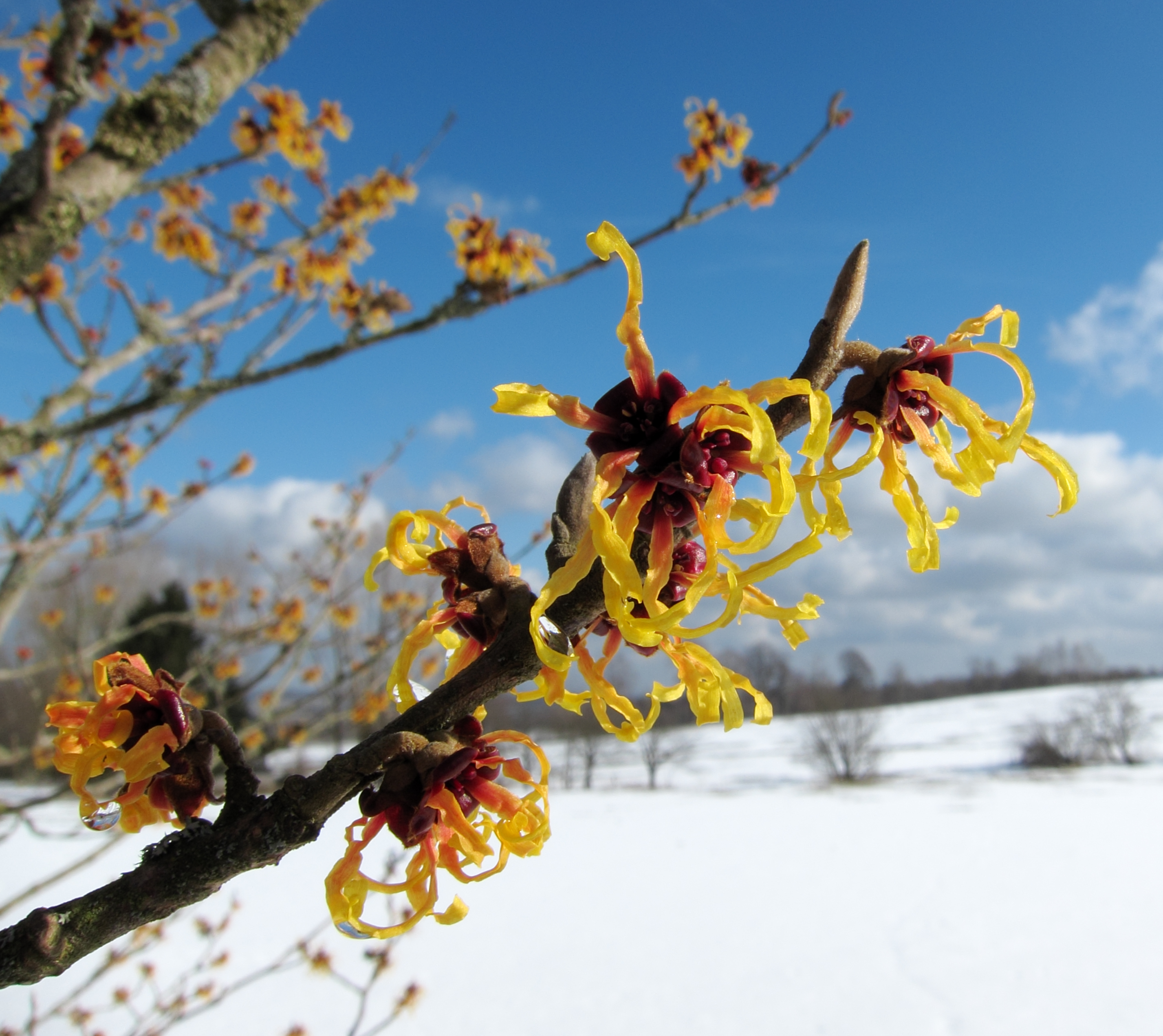
Winter-flowering, Vogelsberg Mountains

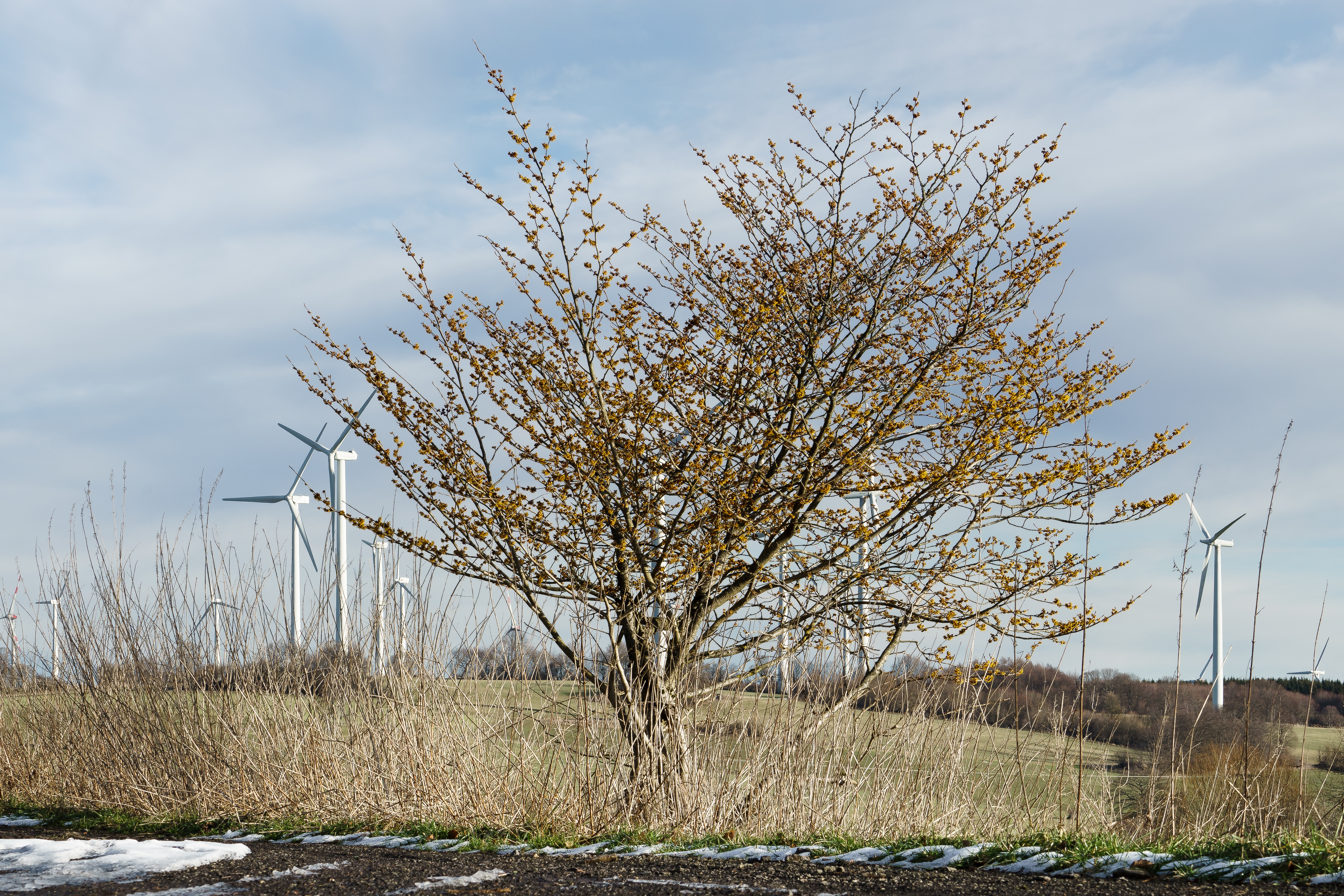
Flourishing in winter
