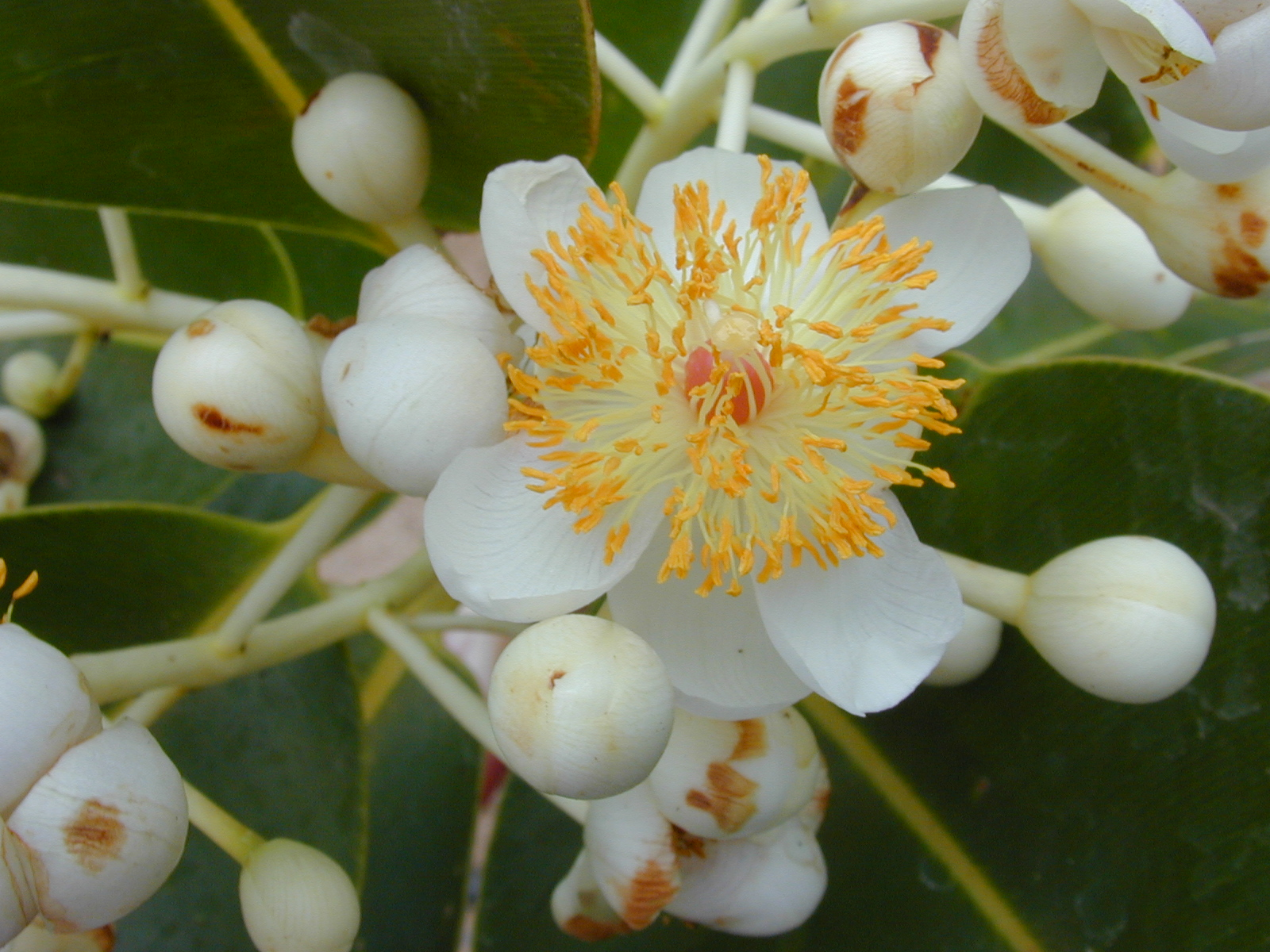
- Flower of Calophyllum inophyllum (Calophyllaceae)

Scientific classification
- Kingdom: Plantae
- Clade: Tracheophytes
- Clade: Angiosperms
- Clade: Eudicots
- Clade: Rosids
- Clade: Fabids
- Order: Malpighiales; Juss. ex Bercht. & J.Presl

Type genus
- Malpighia L.

Families
- see text

Synonyms
- Rhizophorales

= Malpighiales =

Malpighiales Temporal range: Late Cretaceous – recent

Eudicot order of flowering plants

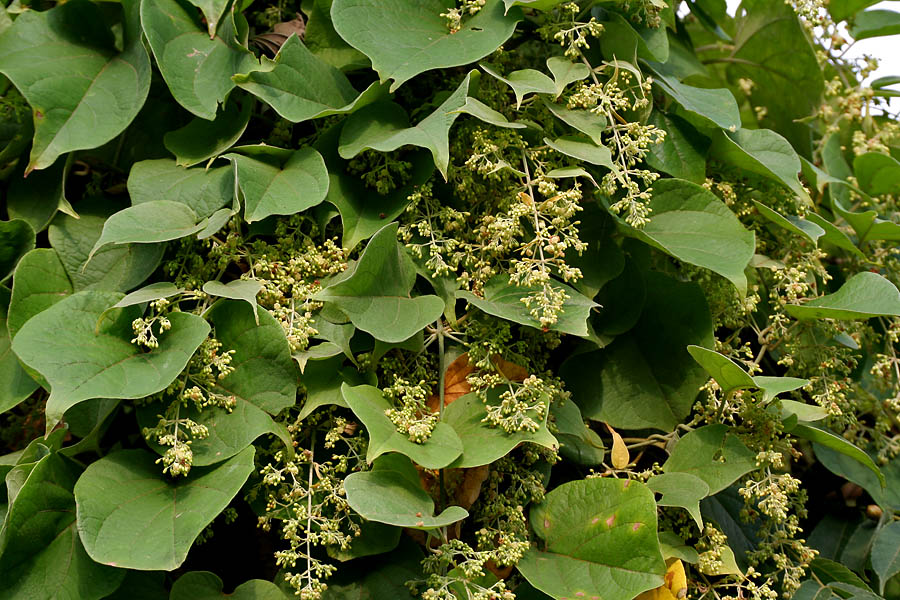
Aspidopterys cordata (Malpighiaceae)

The Malpighiales comprise one of the largest orders of flowering plants. The order is very diverse, with well-known members including willows, violets, poplars, corpse flower, coca plant, cassava, rubber tree, castor bean, spurges, flaxseed, Saint John's wort, passionfruit, mangosteen, and the manchineel tree.

The order is not part of any of the classification systems based only on plant morphology and the relationships of its diverse members can be hard to recognize except with molecular phylogenetic evidence. Molecular clock calculations estimate the origin of stem group Malpighiales at around 100 million years ago (Mya) and the origin of crown group Malpighiales at about 90 Mya.

The Malpighiales contain about 36 families and more than 16,000 species, about 7.8% of the eudicots.

== Taxonomy ==
The Malpighiales include the following 36 families, according to the APG IV system of classification:

- Achariaceae
- Balanopaceae
- Bonnetiaceae
- Calophyllaceae
- Caryocaraceae
- Centroplacaceae
- Chrysobalanaceae
- Clusiaceae
- Ctenolophonaceae
- Dichapetalaceae
- Elatinaceae
- Erythroxylaceae
- Euphorbiaceae
- Euphroniaceae
- Goupiaceae
- Humiriaceae
- Hypericaceae
- Irvingiaceae
- Ixonanthaceae
- Lacistemataceae
- Linaceae
- Lophopyxidaceae
- Malpighiaceae
- Ochnaceae
- Pandaceae
- Passifloraceae
- Peraceae
- Phyllanthaceae
- Picrodendraceae
- Podostemaceae
- Putranjivaceae
- Rafflesiaceae
- Rhizophoraceae
- Salicaceae
- Trigoniaceae
- Violaceae

In the APG III system, 35 families were recognized. Medusagynaceae, Quiinaceae, Peraceae, Malesherbiaceae, Turneraceae, Samydaceae, and Scyphostegiaceae were consolidated into other families. The largest family, by far, is the Euphorbiaceae, with about 7500 species in about 300 genera. Changes made in the Angiosperm Phylogeny Group (APG) classification of 2016 (APG IV) were the inclusion of Irvingiaceae, Peraceae, Euphorbiaceae and Ixonanthaceae, together with the transfer of the COM clade from the fabids (rosid I) to the malvids (rosid II).

== Phylogeny ==
The phylogenetic tree shown below is from Xi et al. (2012). The study presented a more resolved phylogenetic tree than previous studies through the use of data from a large number of genes. They included analyses of 82 plastid genes from 58 species (ignoring the problematic Rafflesiaceae), using partitions identified a posteriori by applying a Bayesian mixture model. Xi et al. identified 12 additional clades and three major, basal clades.

- - Oxalidales (outgroup)
  - Malpighiales
    - - euphorbioids
        - - Euphorbiaceae
          - Peraceae
        - - phyllanthoids
            - Picrodendraceae
            - Phyllanthaceae
          - linoids
            - Linaceae
            - Ixonanthaceae
      - - parietal clade
          - - salicoids
              - - - - Salicaceae
                    - Scyphostegiaceae
                  - Samydaceae
                - Lacistemataceae
              - - - Passifloraceae
                  - Turneraceae
                - Malesherbiaceae
            - - Violaceae
              - Goupiaceae
          - Achariaceae
        - Humiriaceae
    - - - clusioids
          - - - Hypericaceae
              - Podostemaceae
            - Calophyllaceae
          - - Clusiaceae
            - Bonnetiaceae
        - ochnoids
          - Ochnaceae
          - - Quiinaceae
            - Medusagynaceae
      - - - Rhizophoraceae
          - Erythroxylaceae
        - Ctenolophonaceae
      - - Pandaceae
        - Irvingiaceae
    - - chrysobalanoids
        - - - Chrysobalanaceae
            - Euphroniaceae
          - - Dichapetalaceae
            - Trigoniaceae
        - Balanopaceae
      - malpighioids
        - - Malpighiaceae
          - Elatinaceae
        - Centroplacaceae
      - Caryocaraceae
      - putranjivoids
        - Putranjivaceae
        - Lophopyxidaceae

== Circumscription ==
Malpighiales is monophyletic and in molecular phylogenetic studies, it receives strong statistical support. Since the APG II system was published in 2003, minor changes to the circumscription of the order have been made. The family Peridiscaceae has been expanded from two genera to three, and then to four, and transferred to Saxifragales.

The genera Cyrillopsis (Ixonanthaceae), Centroplacus (Centroplacaceae), Bhesa (Centroplacaceae), Aneulophus (Erythroxylaceae), Ploiarium (Bonnetiaceae), Trichostephanus (Samydaceae), Sapria (Rafflesiaceae), Rhizanthes (Rafflesiaceae), and Rafflesia (Rafflesiaceae) had been either added or confirmed as members of Malpighiales by the end of 2009.

Some family delimitations within the order have changed, as well, most notably, the segregation of Calophyllaceae from Clusiaceae sensu lato when it was shown that the latter is paraphyletic. Some differences of opinion on family delimitation exist, as well. For example, Samydaceae and Scyphostegiaceae may be recognized as families or included in a large version of Salicaceae.

The group is difficult to characterize phenotypically, due to sheer morphological diversity, ranging from tropical holoparasites with giant flowers, such as Rafflesia, to temperate trees and herbs with tiny, simple flowers, such as Salix. Members often have dentate leaves, with the teeth having a single vein running into a congested and often deciduous apex (i.e., violoid, salicoid, or theoid). Also, zeylanol has recently been discovered in Balanops and Dichapetalum which are in the balanops clade (so-called Chrysobalanaceae s. l.). The so-called parietal suborder (the clusioid clade and Ochnaceae s. l. were also part of Parietales) corresponds with the traditional Violales as 8 (Achariaceae, Violaceae, Flacourtiaceae, Lacistemataceae, Scyphostegiaceae, Turneraceae, Malesherbiaceae, and Passifloraceae) of the order's 10 families along with Salicaceae, which have usually been assigned as a related order or suborder, are in this most derived malpighian suborder, so that eight of the 10 families of this suborder are Violales. The family Flacourtiaceae has proven to be polyphyletic as the cyanogenic members have been placed in Achariaceae and the ones with salicoid teeth were transferred to Salicaceae. Scyphostegiaceae, consisting of the single genus Scyphostegia has been merged into Salicaceae.

== Affinities ==
Malpighiales is a member of a supraordinal group called the COM clade, which consists of the orders Celastrales, Oxalidales, and Malpighiales. Some describe it as containing a fourth order, Huales, separating the family Huaceae into its own order, separate from Oxalidales.

Some recent studies have placed Malpighiales as sister to Oxalidales sensu lato (including Huaceae), while others have found a different topology for the COM clade.

The COM clade is part of an unranked group known as malvids (rosid II), though formally placed in Fabidae (rosid I). These in turn are part of a group that has long been recognized, namely, the rosids.

== History ==
The French botanist Charles Plumier named the genus Malpighia in honor of Marcello Malpighi's work on plants; Malpighia is the type genus for the Malpighiaceae, a family of tropical and subtropical flowering plants.

The family Malpighiaceae was the type family for one of the orders created by Jussieu in his 1789 work Genera Plantarum. Friedrich von Berchtold and Jan Presl described such an order in 1820. Unlike modern taxonomists, these authors did not use the suffix "ales" in naming their orders. The name "Malpighiales" is attributed by some to Carl von Martius. In the 20th century, it was usually associated with John Hutchinson, who used it in all three editions of his book, The Families of Flowering Plants. The name was not used by those who wrote later, in the 1970s, '80s, and '90s.

The taxon was largely presaged by Hans Hallier in 1912 in an article in the Archiv. Néerl. Sci. Exact. Nat. titled "L'Origine et le système phylétique des angiospermes", in which his Passionales and Polygalinae were derived from Linaceae (in Guttales), with Passionales containing seven (of eight) families that also appear in the current Malpighiales, namely Passifloraceae, Salicaceae, Euphorbiaceae, Achariaceae, Flacourtiaceae, Malesherbiaceae, and Turneraceae, and Polygalinae containing four (of 10) families that also appear in the current Malpighiales, namely Malpighiaceae, Violaceae, Dichapetalaceae, and Trigoniaceae.

The molecular phylogenetic revolution led to a major restructuring of the order. The first semblance of Malpighiales as now known came from a phylogeny of seed plants published in 1993 and based upon DNA sequences of the gene rbcL. This study recovered a group of rosids unlike any group found in any previous system of plant classification. To make a clear break with classification systems being used at that time, the Angiosperm Phylogeny Group resurrected Hutchinson's name, though his concept of Malpighiales included much of what is now in Celastrales and Oxalidales.

== Gallery of type genera ==
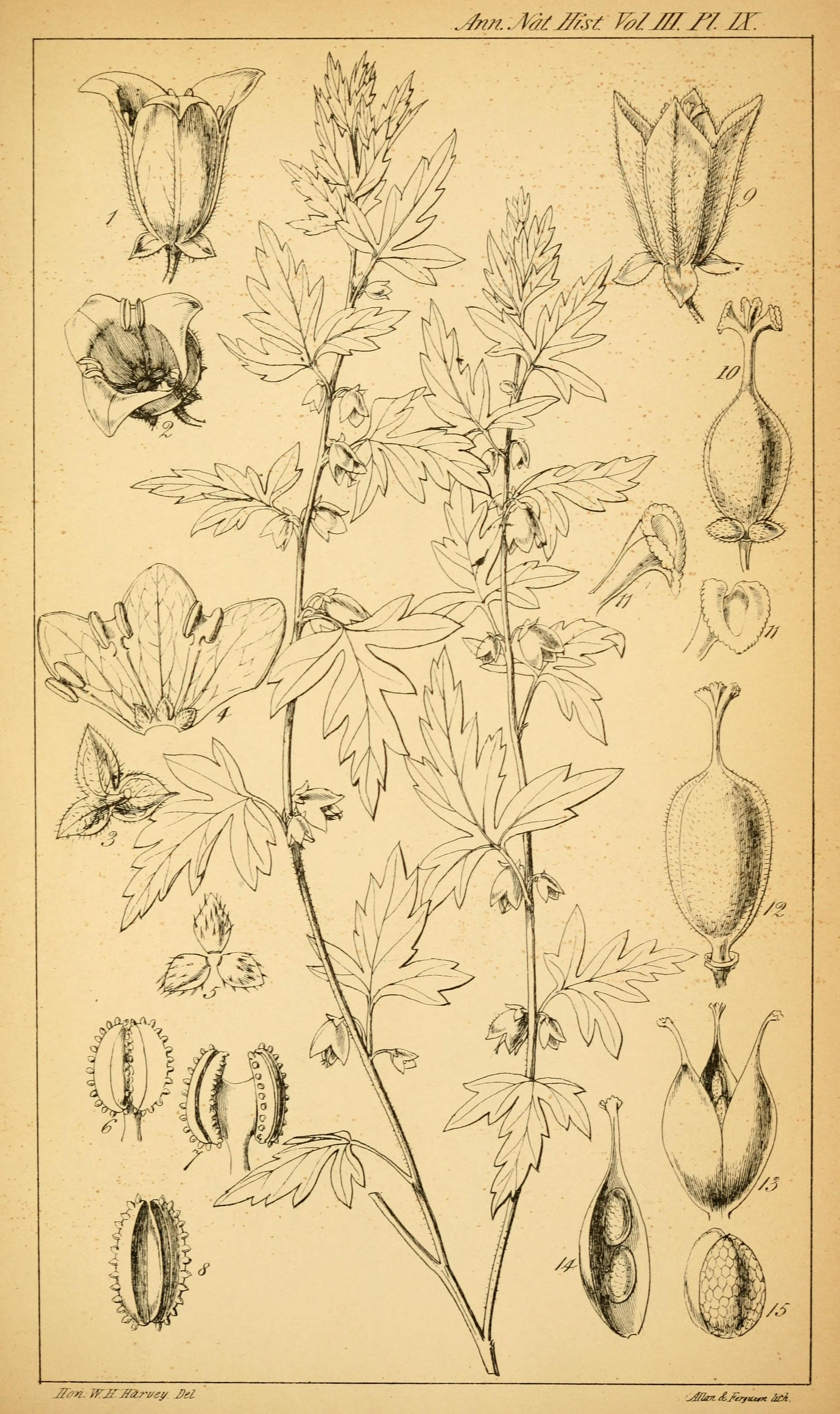
Acharia tragodes (chaulmoogra family)

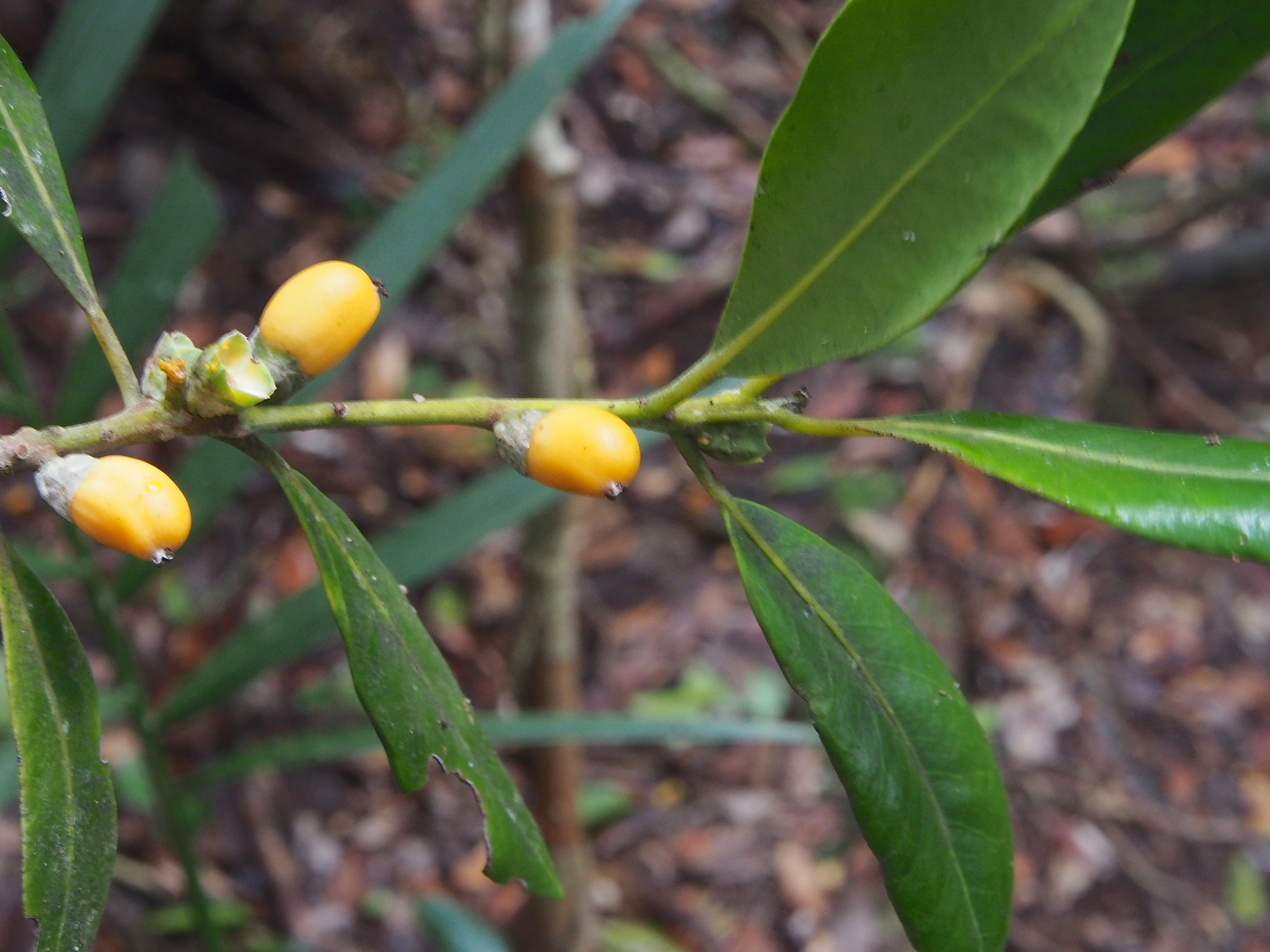
Balanops australiana (pimplebark family)

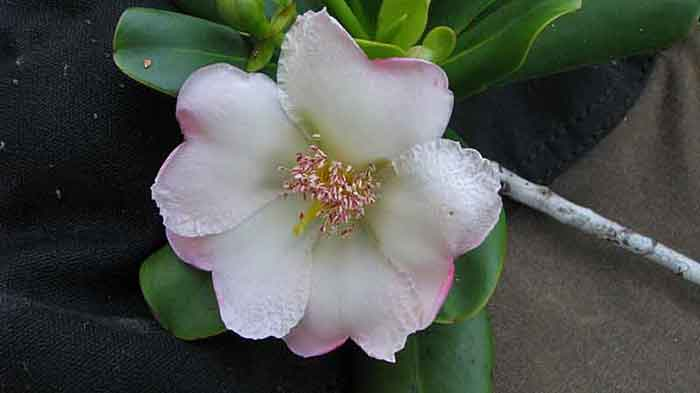
Bonnetia stricta (cascarilla family)

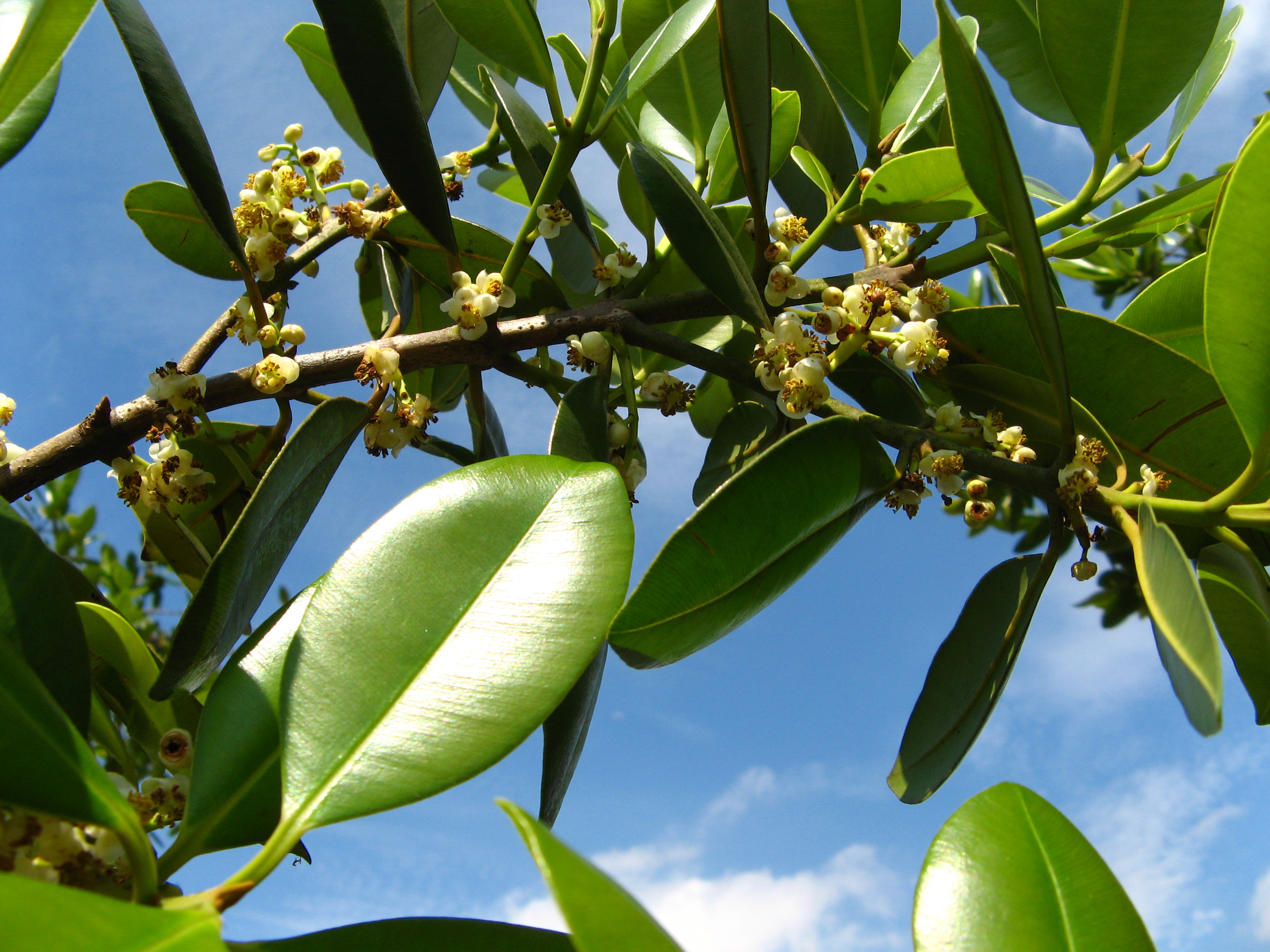
Calophyllum brasiliense (takamaka family)

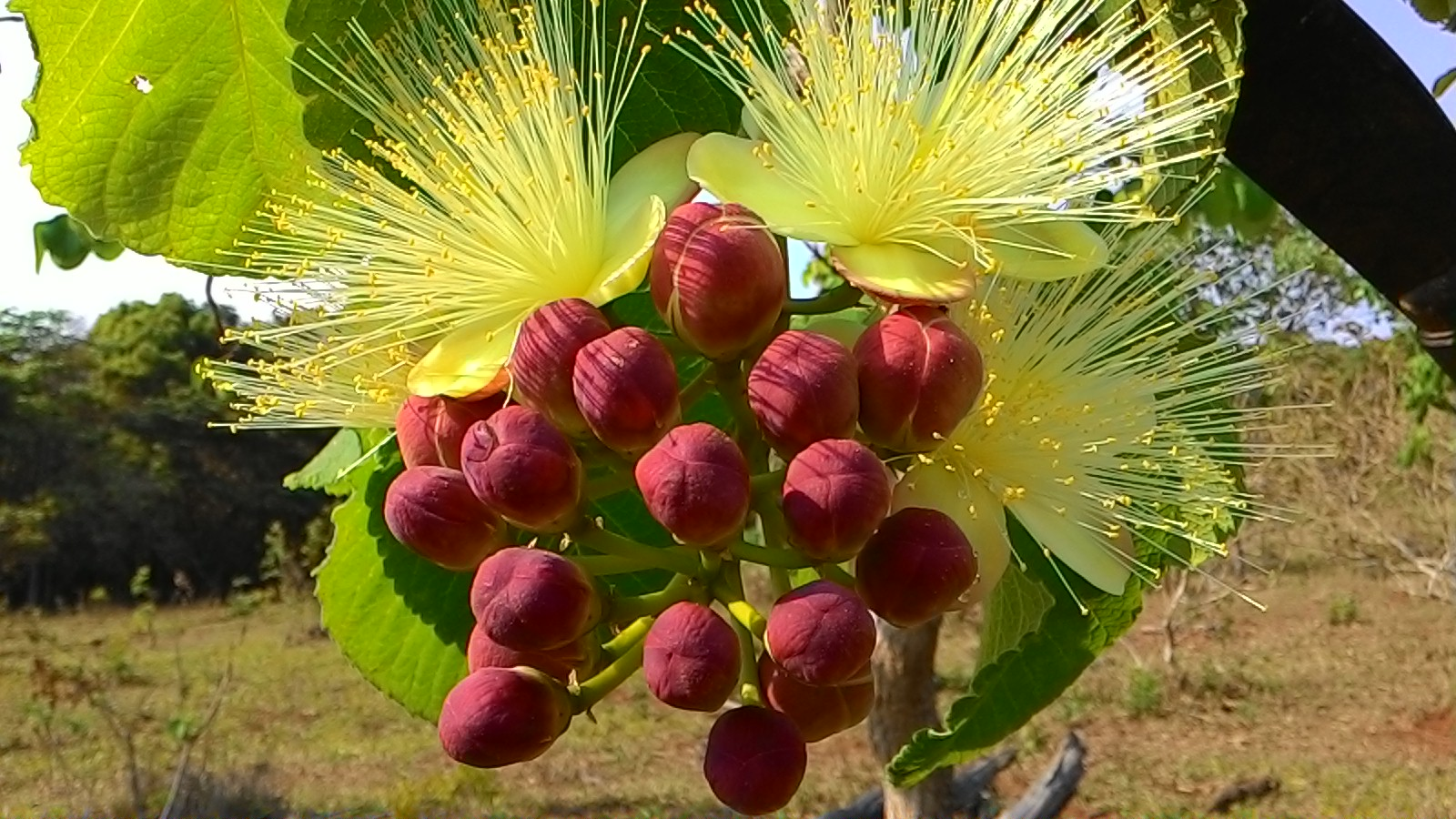
Caryocar brasiliense (souari-tree family)

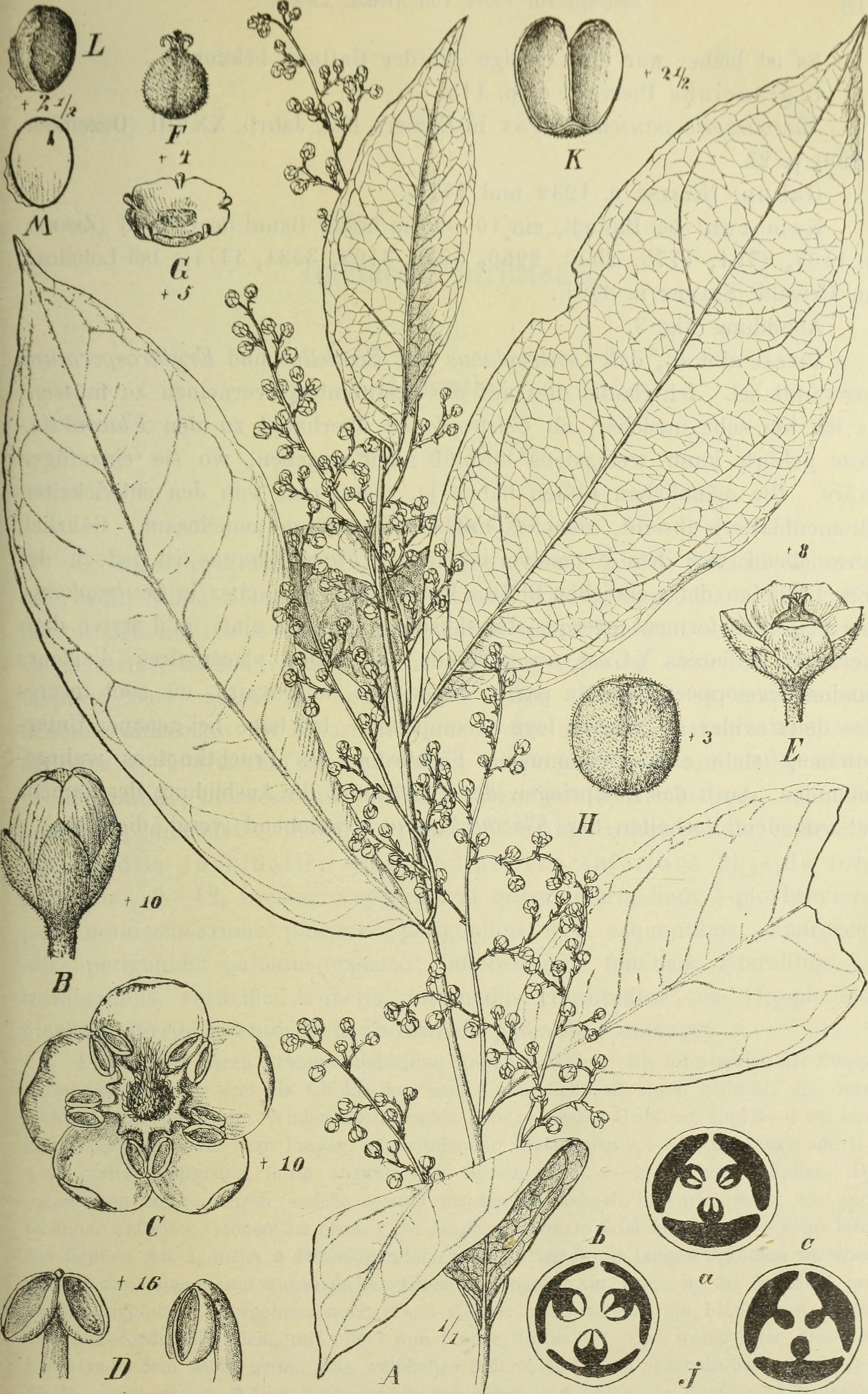
Centroplacus glaucinus (biku-biku family)

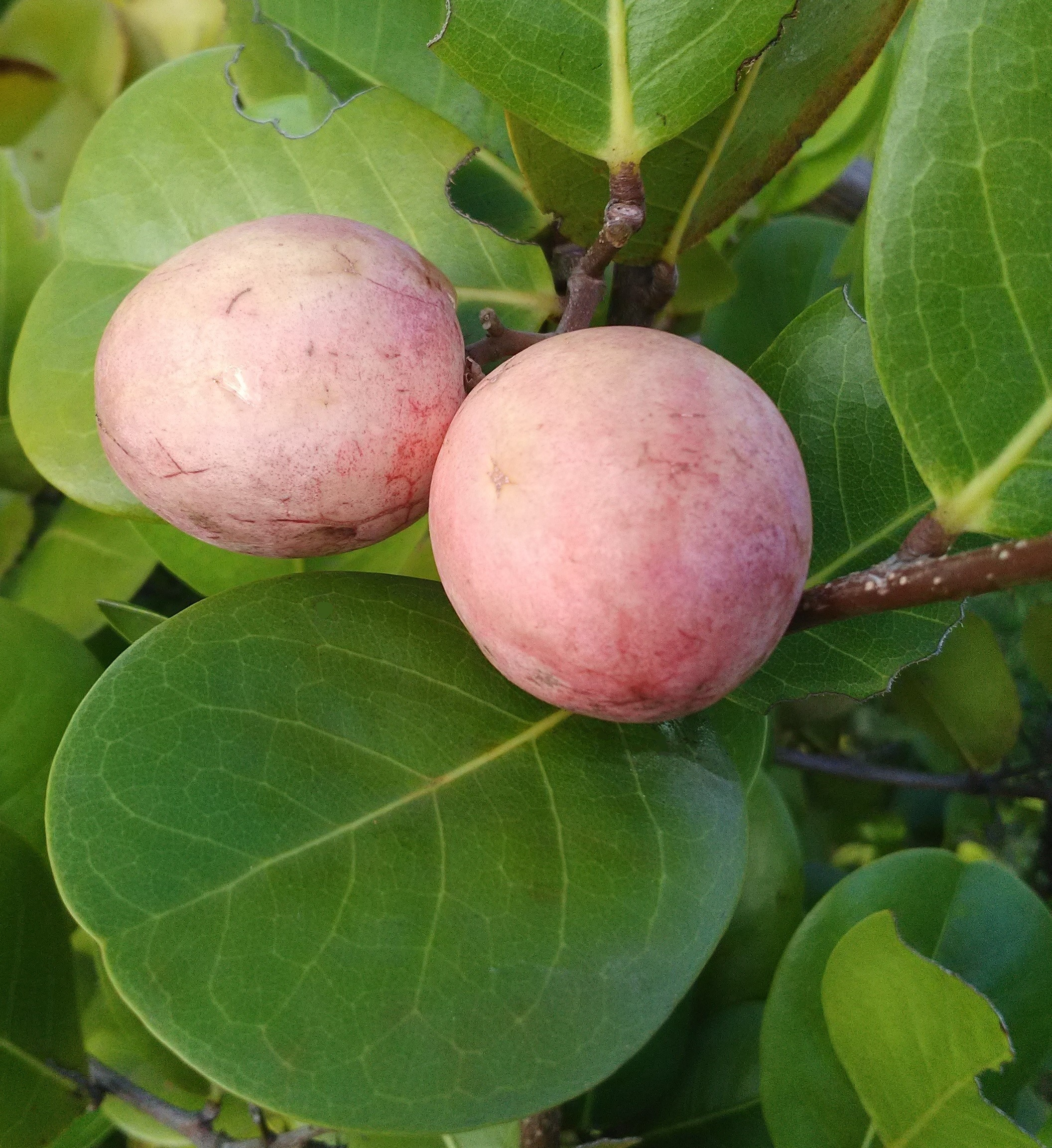
Chrysobalanus icaco (cocoplum family)

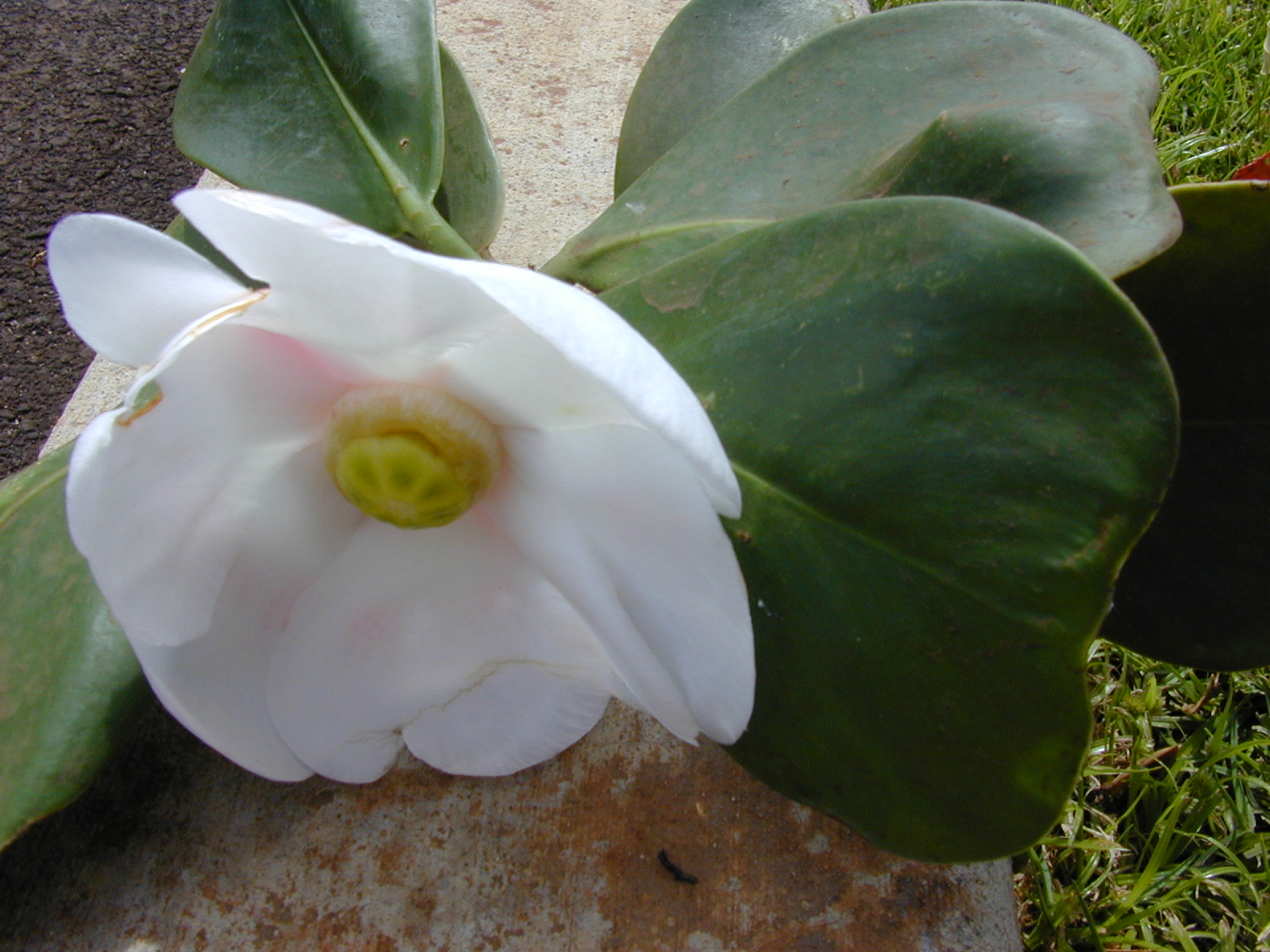
Clusia rosea (mangosteen family)

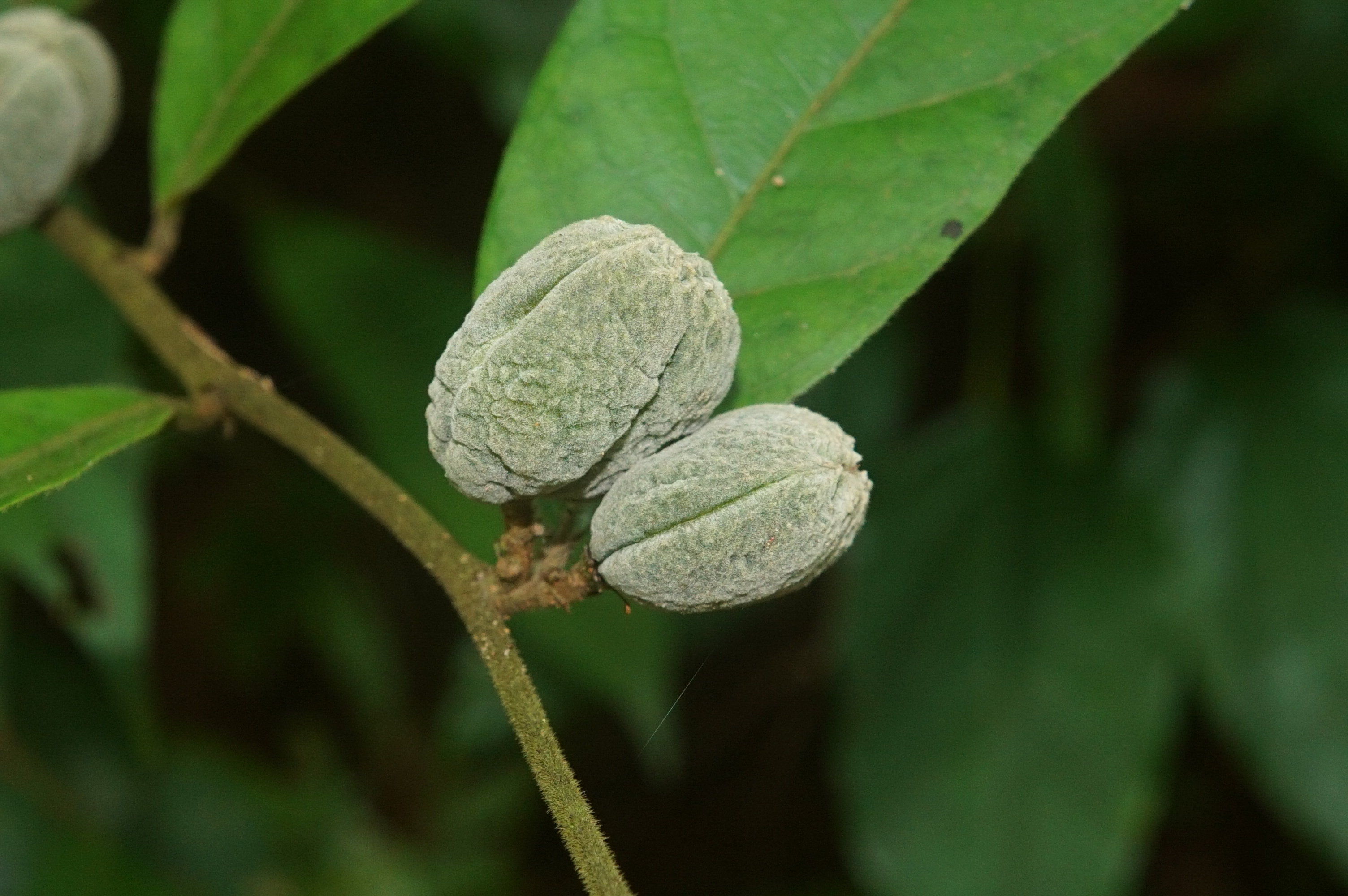
Dichapetalum gelonioides (ratbane family)

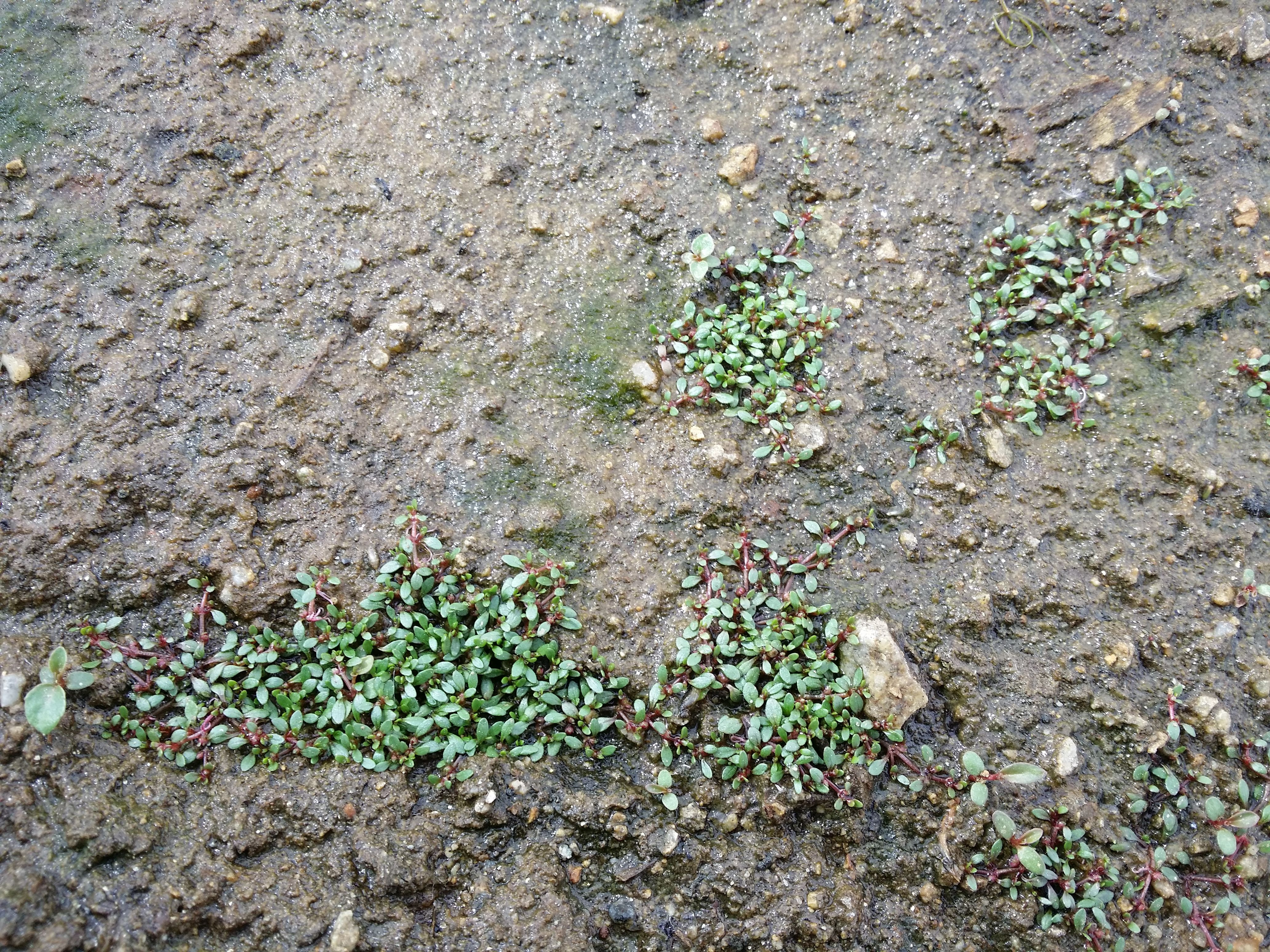
Elatine hydropiper (waterwort family)

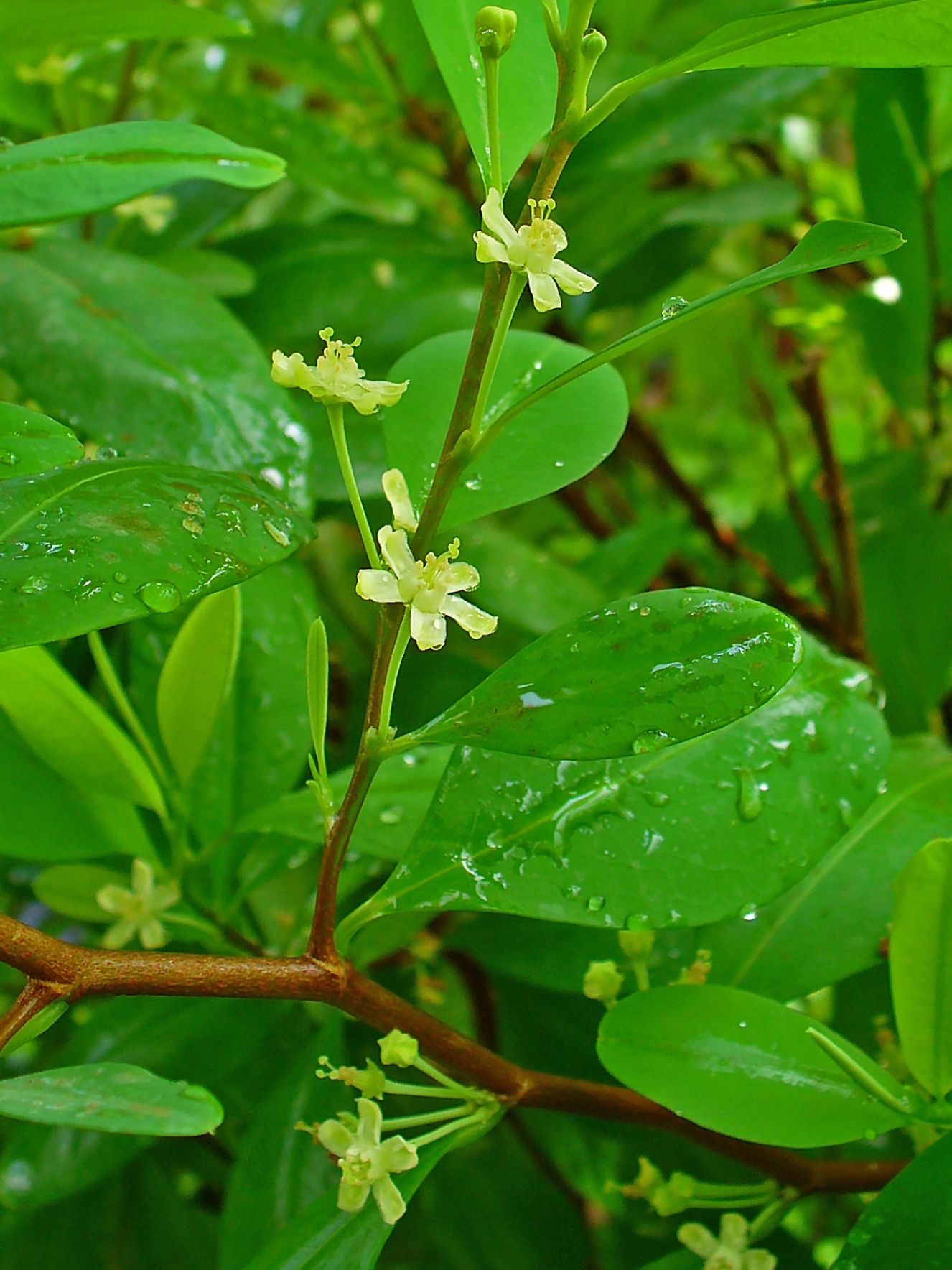
Erythroxylum coca (coca family)

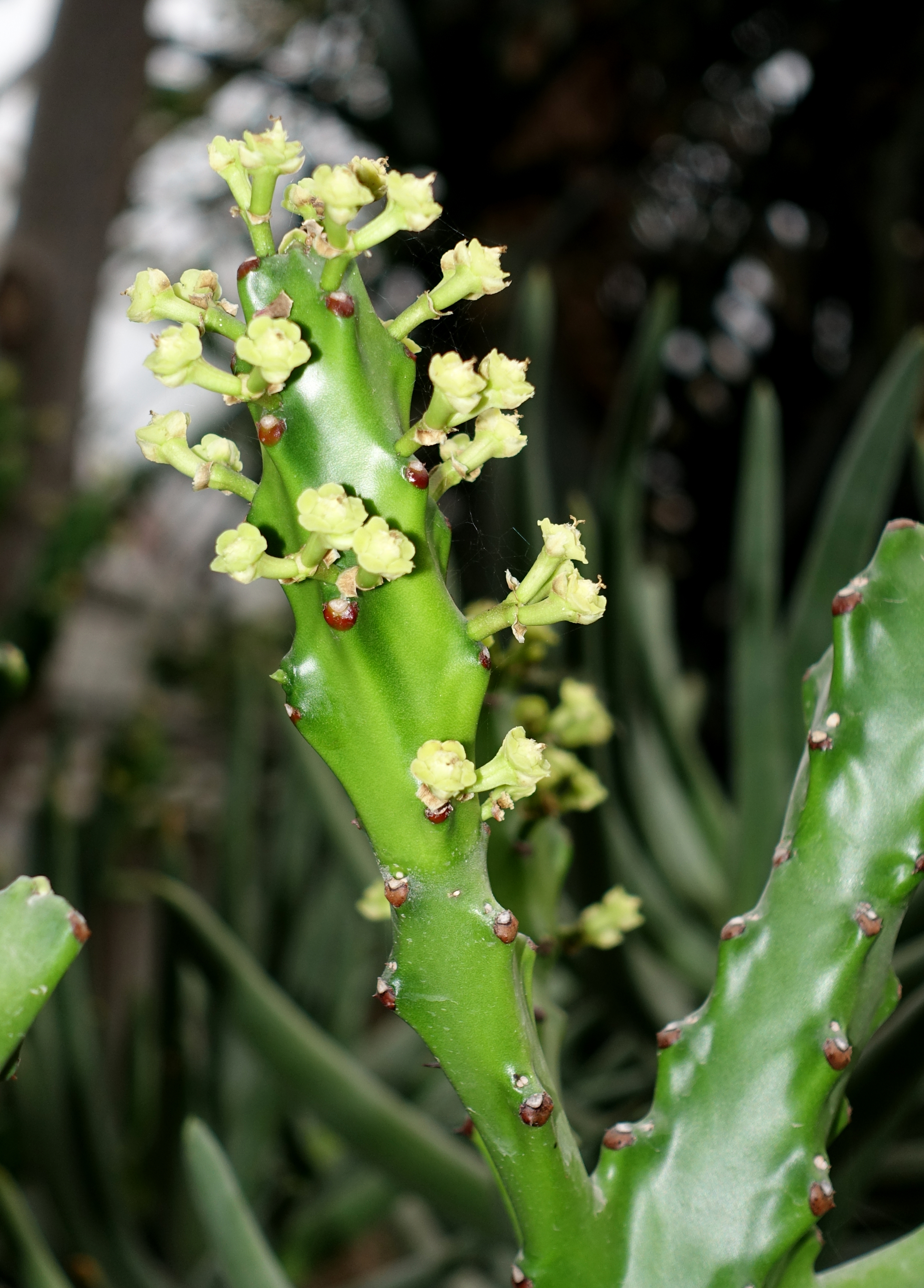
Euphorbia antiquorum (spurge family)

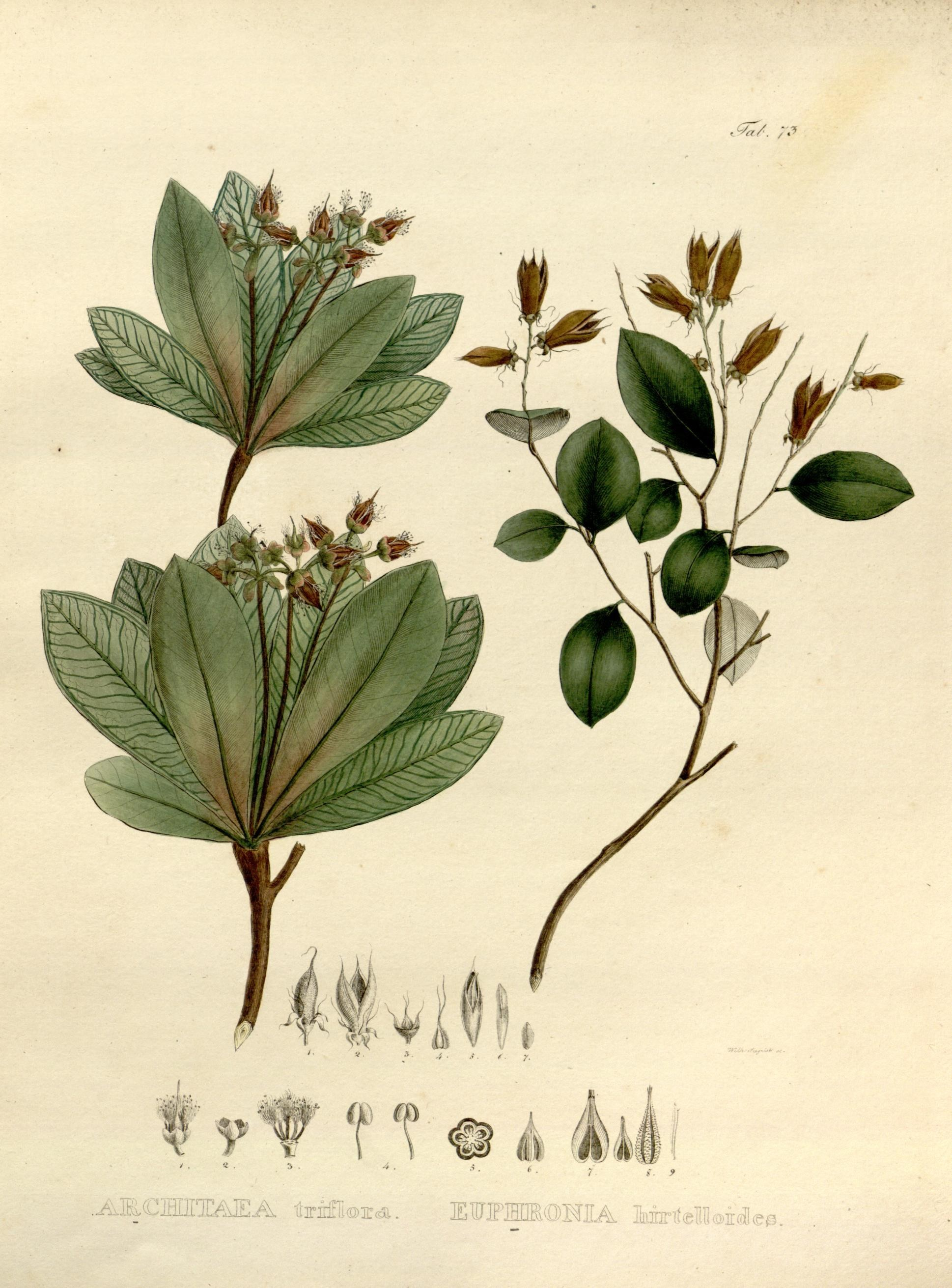
Euphronia hirtelloides (euphronia family)

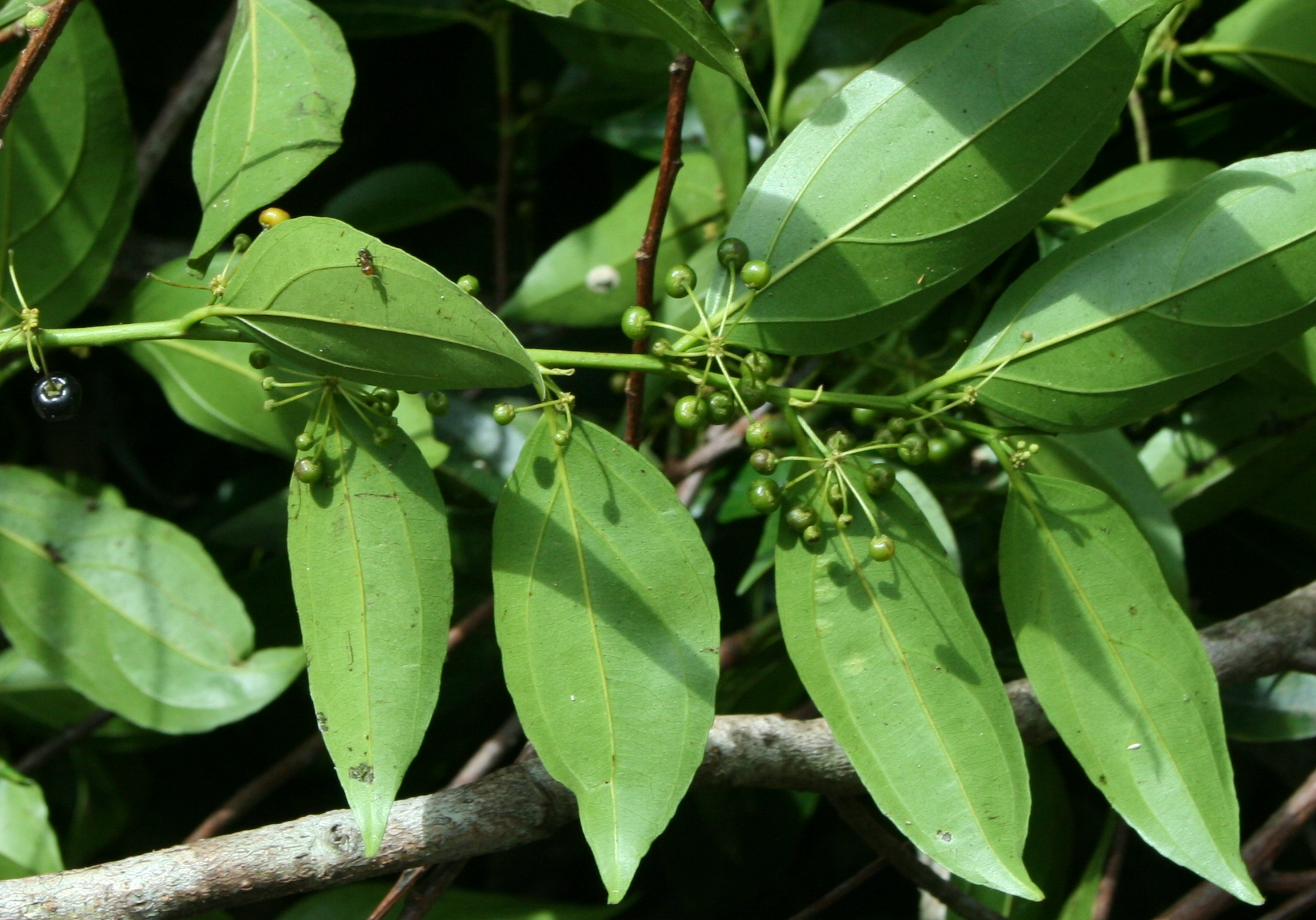
Goupia glabra (kopi family)

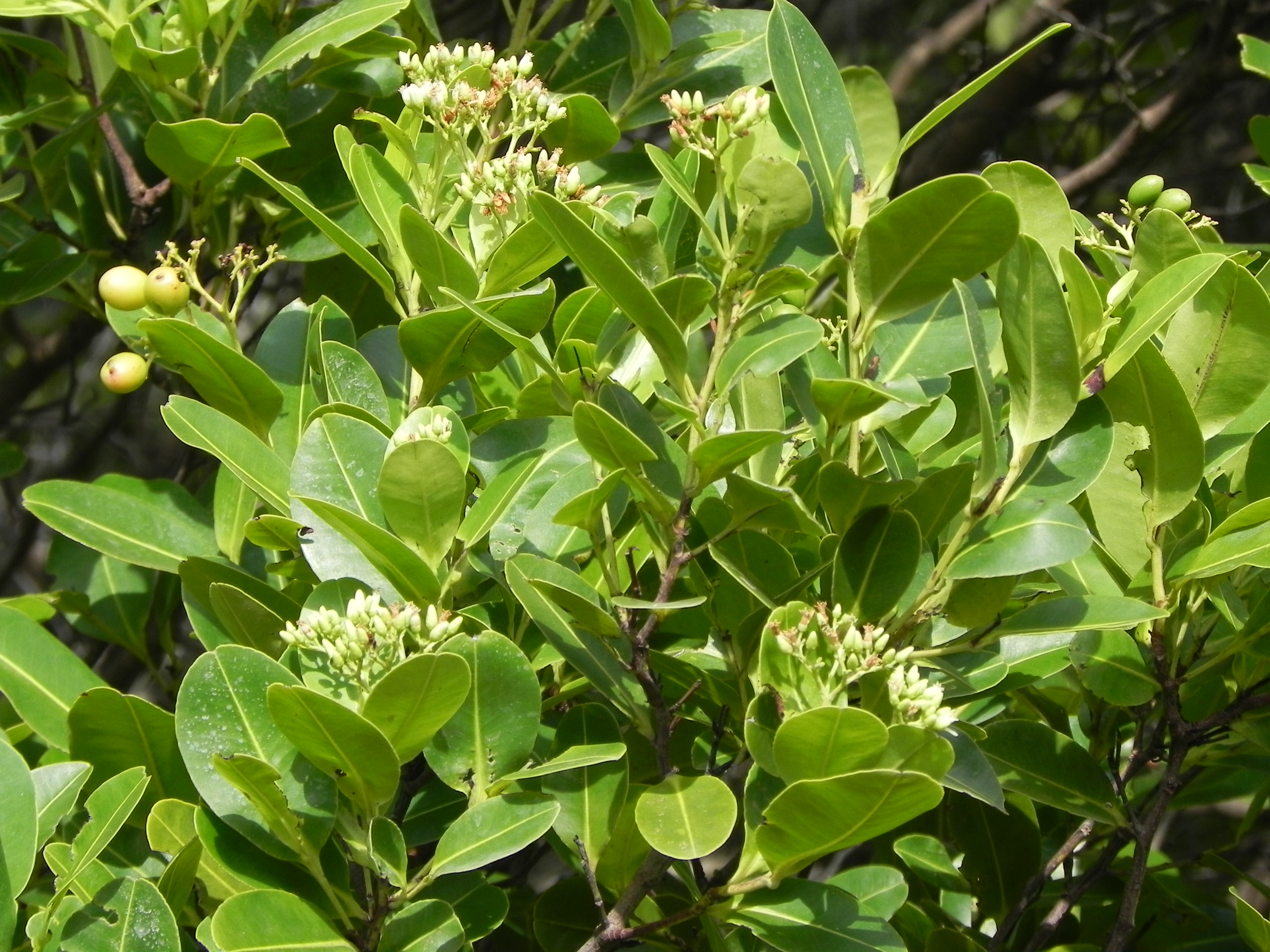
Humiria balsamifera (umiri family)

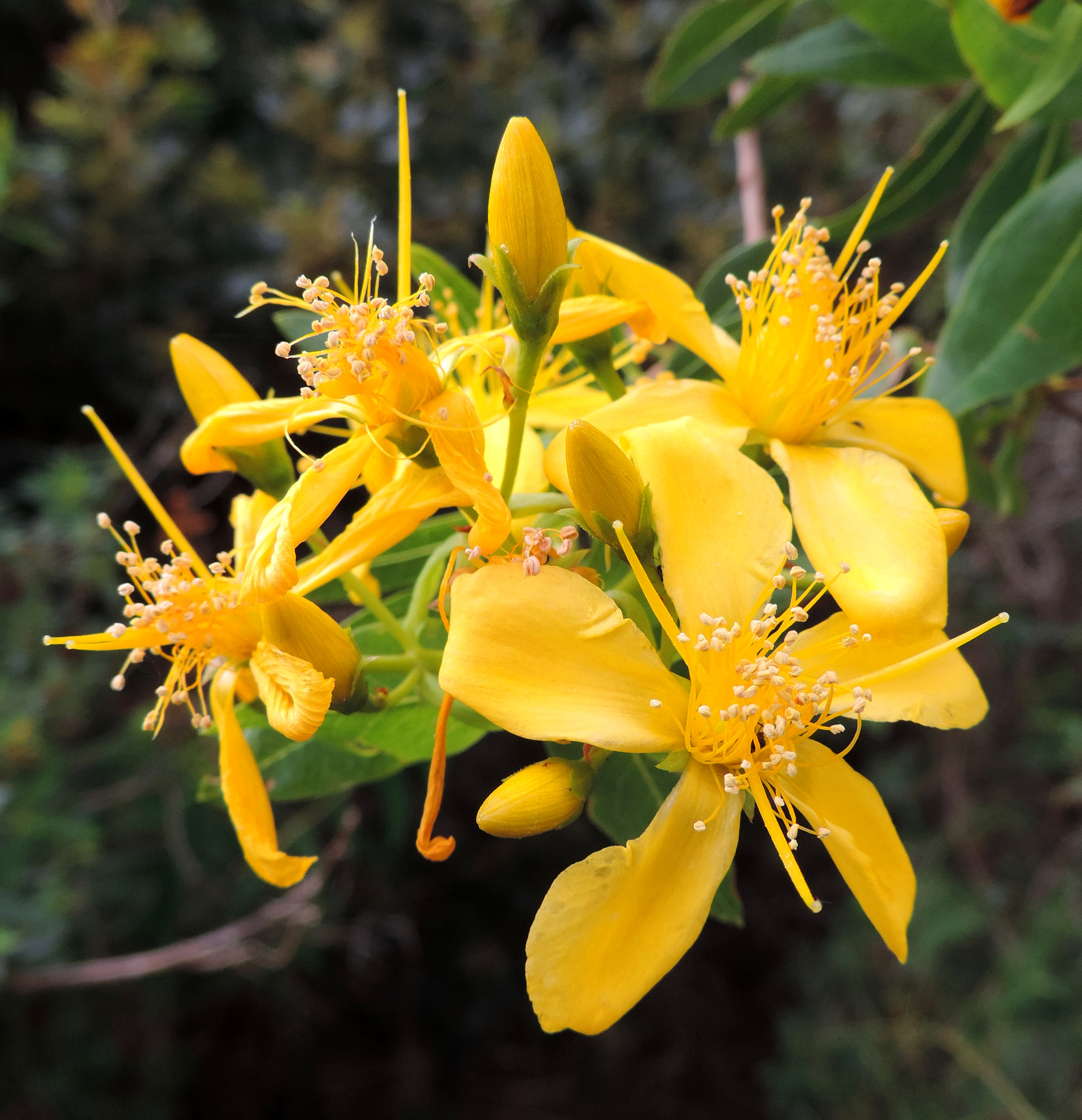
Hypericum canariense (St.-John's-wort family)

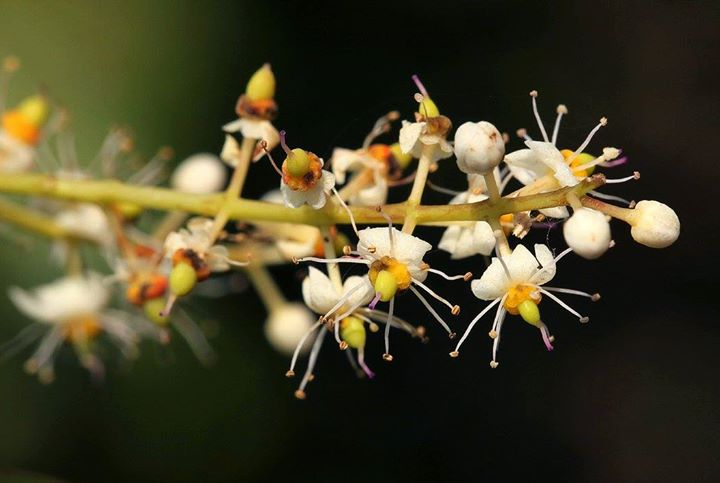
Irvingia smithii (ogbono-nut family)

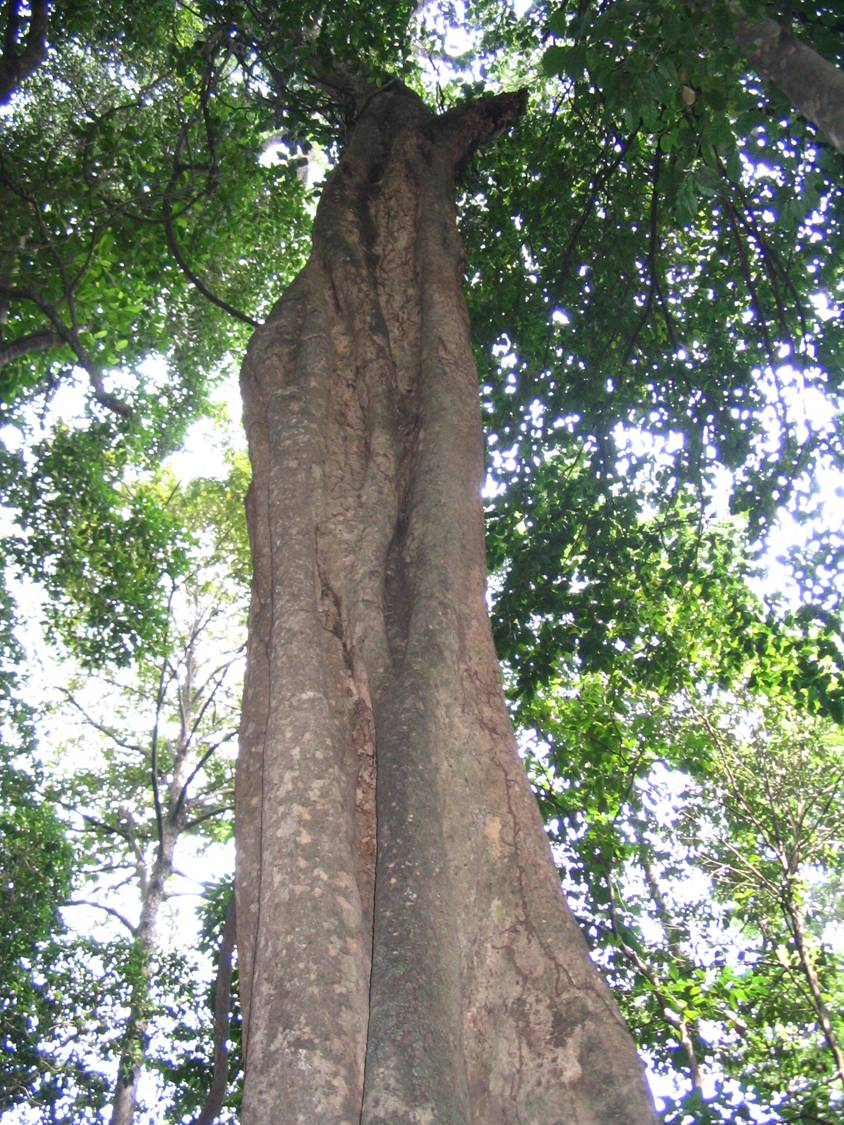
Ixonanthes reticulata (twentymen-tree family)

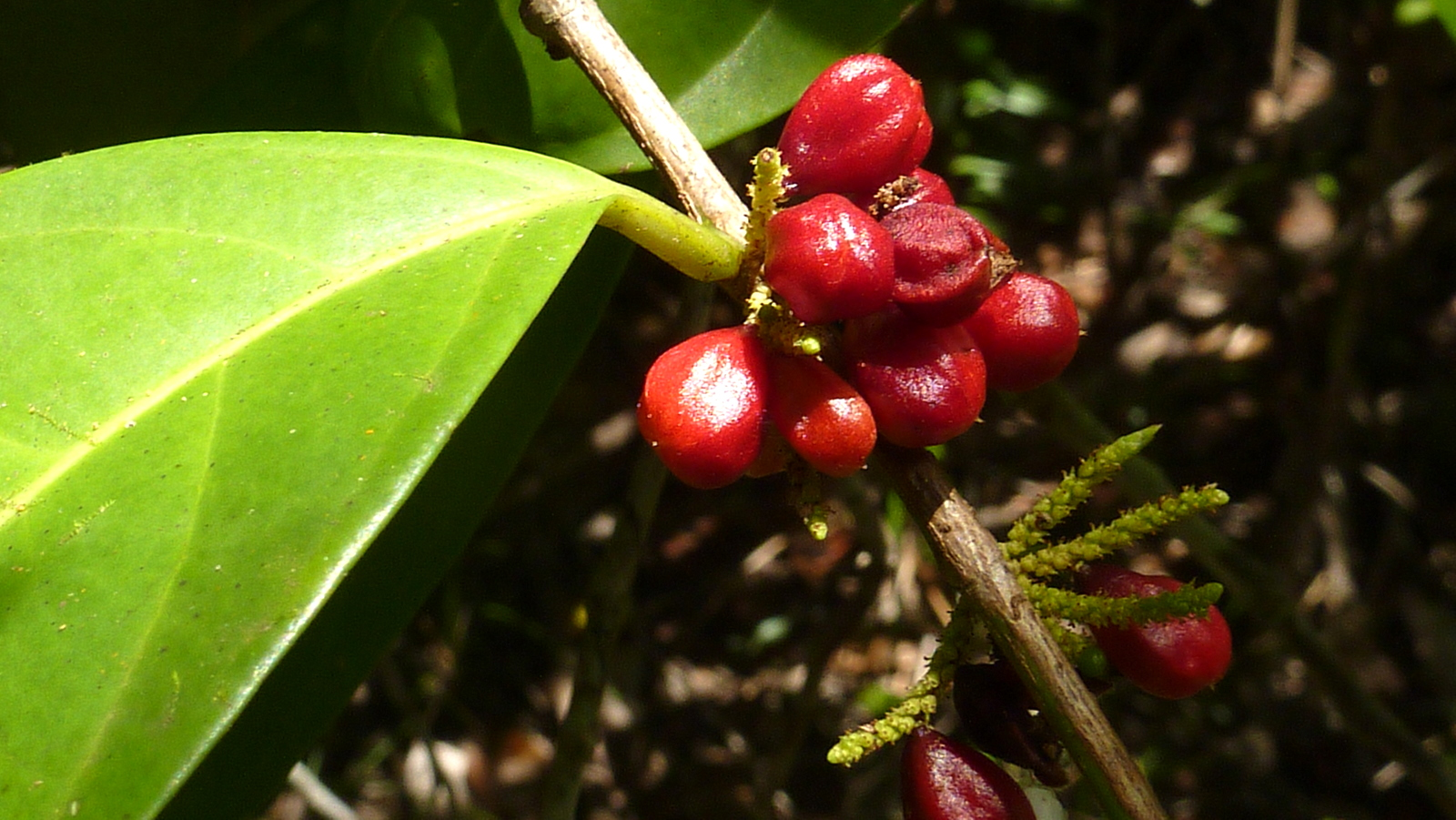
Lacistema hasslerianum (cemp-wood family)

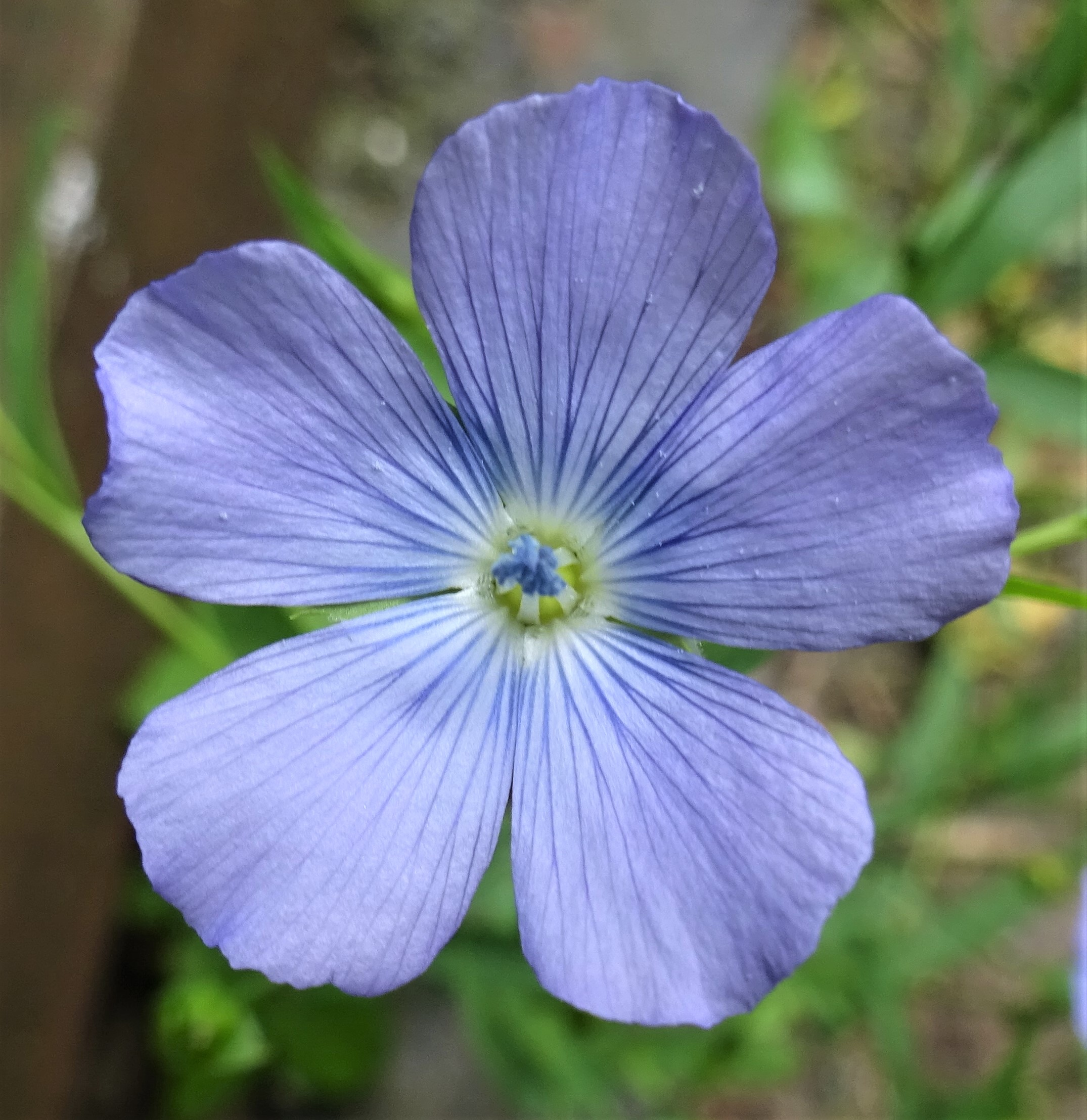
Linum usitatissimum (flax family)

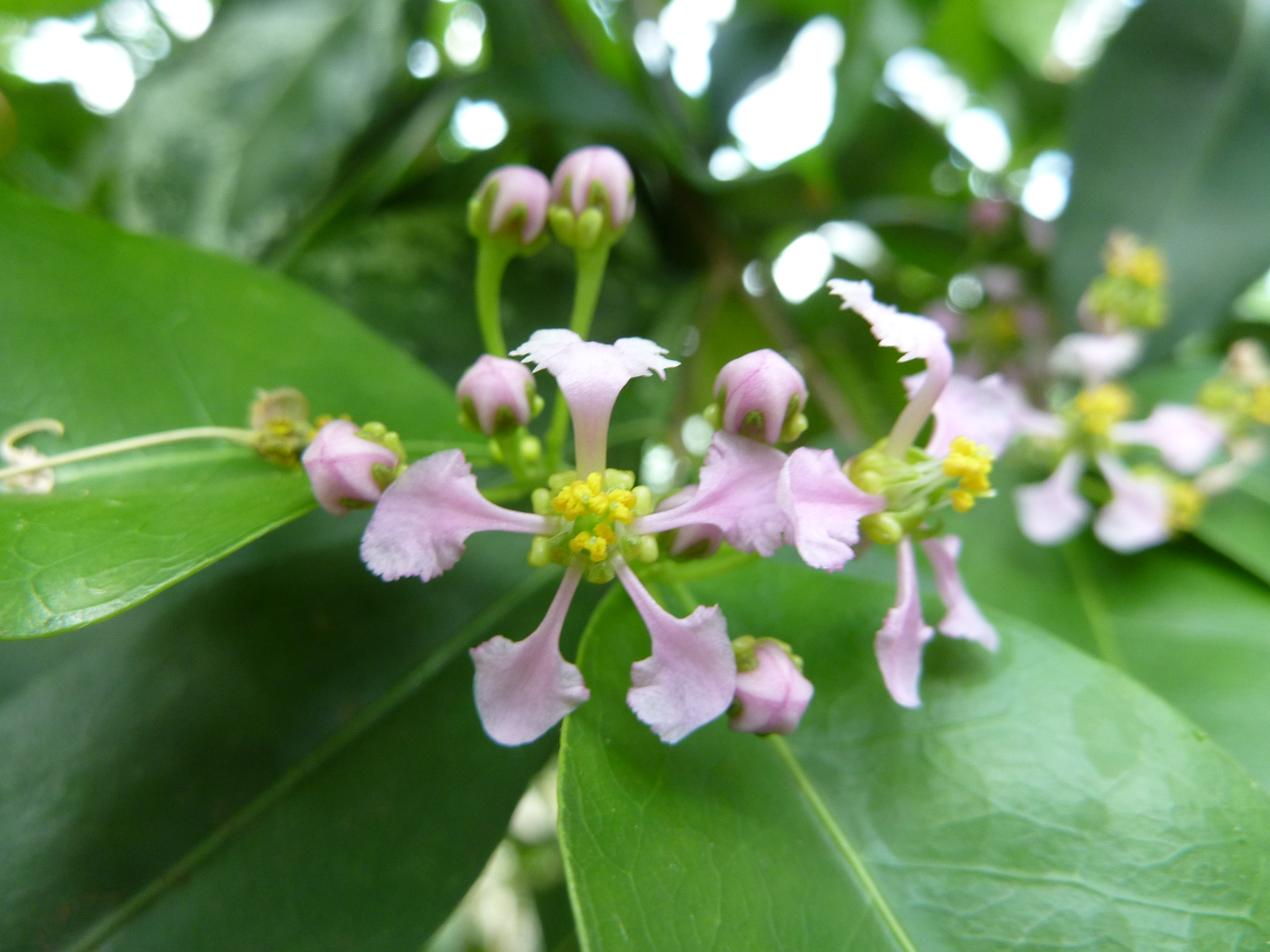
Malpighia glabra (acerola family)

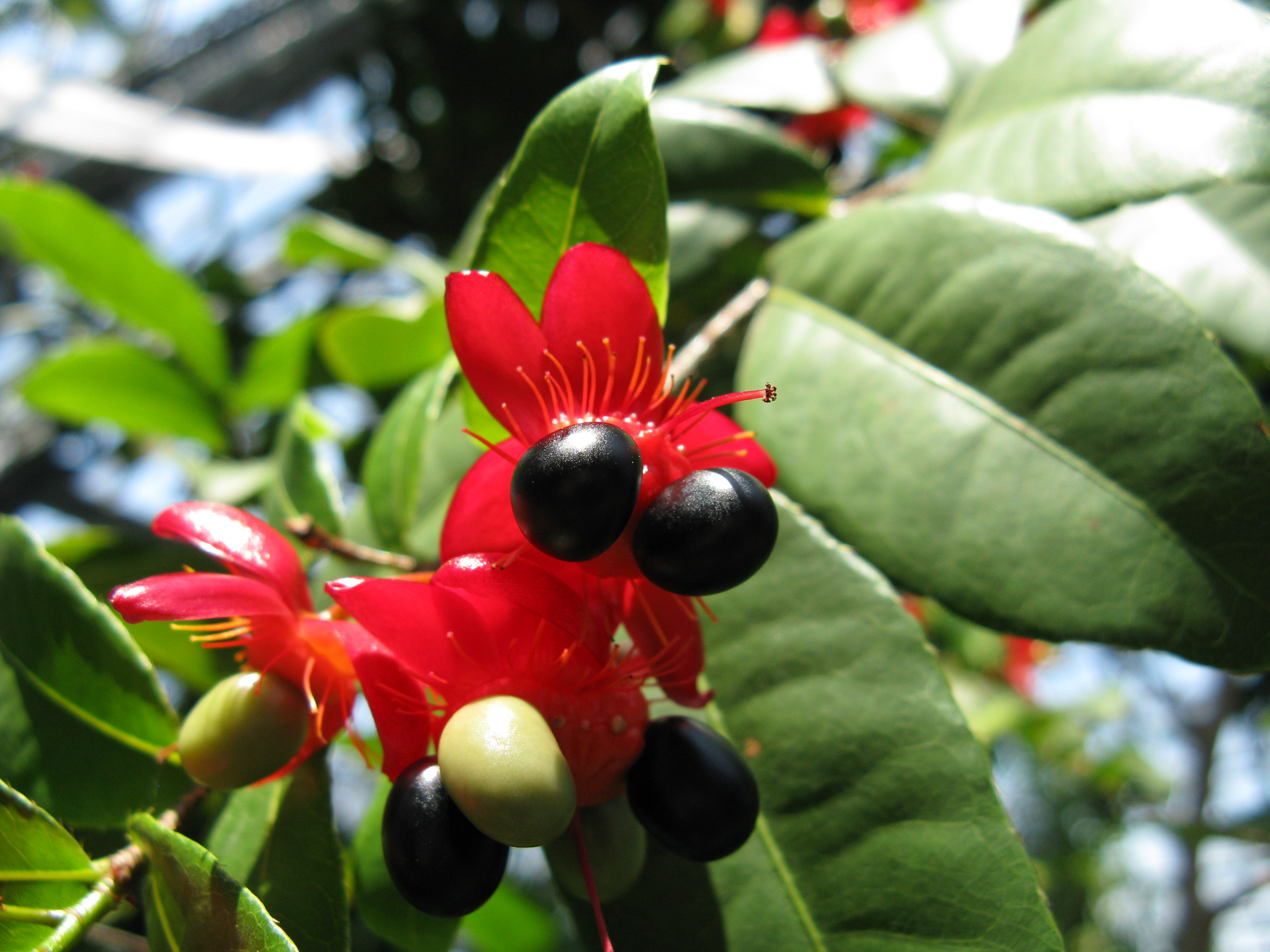
Ochna thomasiana (Mickey-Mouse-plant family)

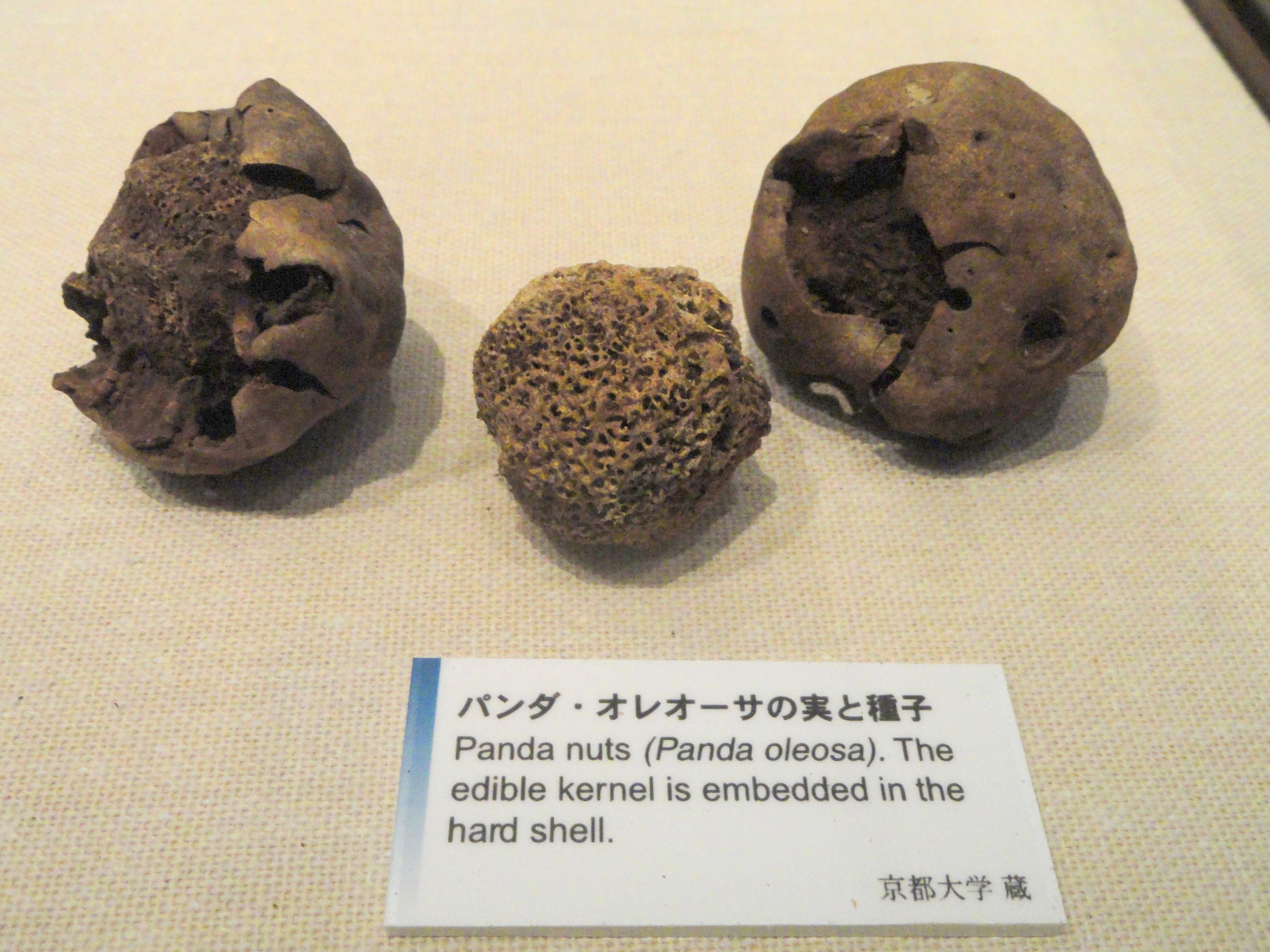
Panda oleosa (kana-nut family)

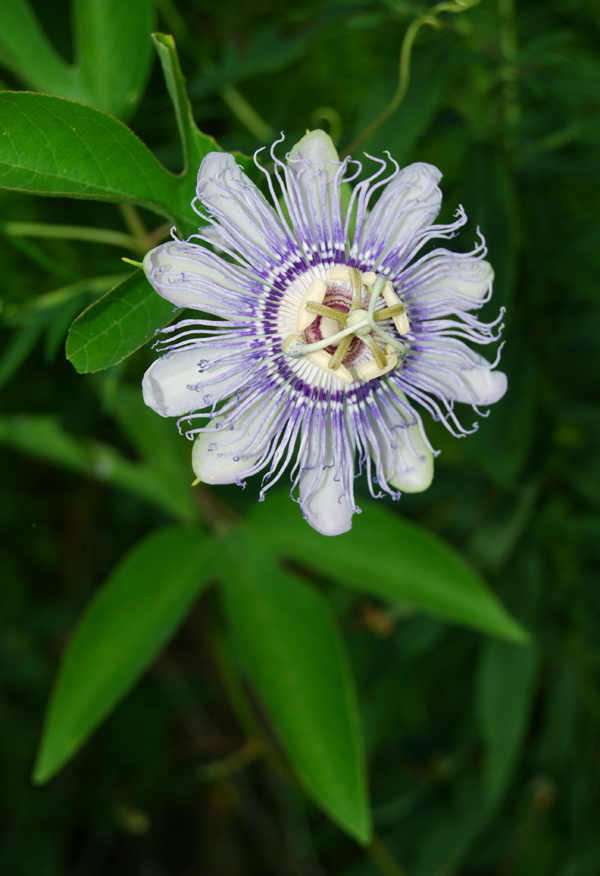
Passiflora incarnata (passionfruit family)

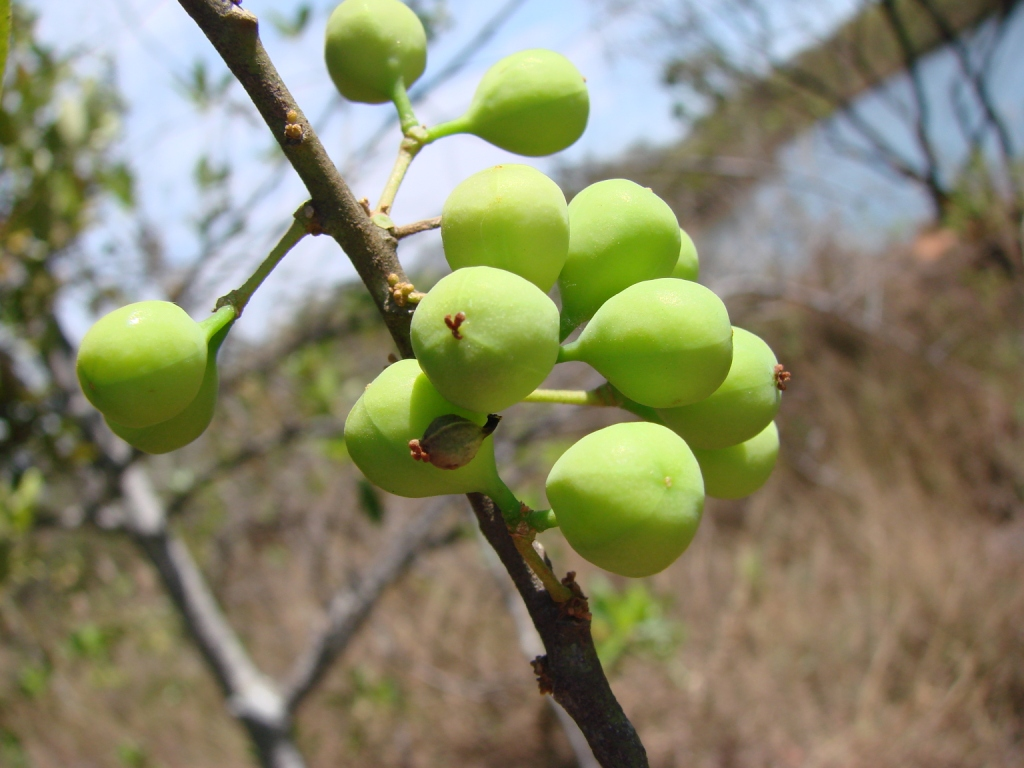
Pera glabrata (lightning-bush family)

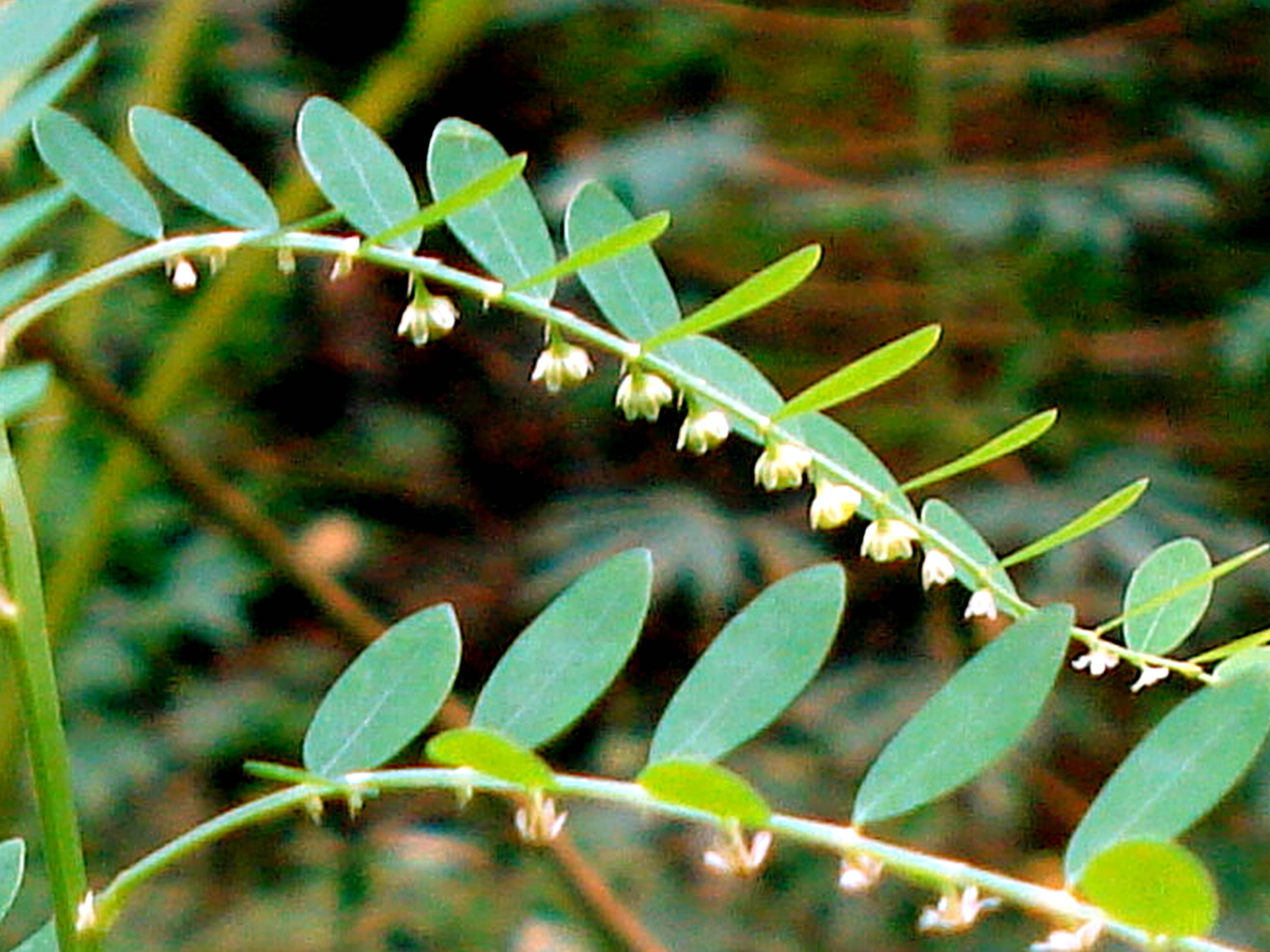
Phyllanthus niruri (leafflower family)

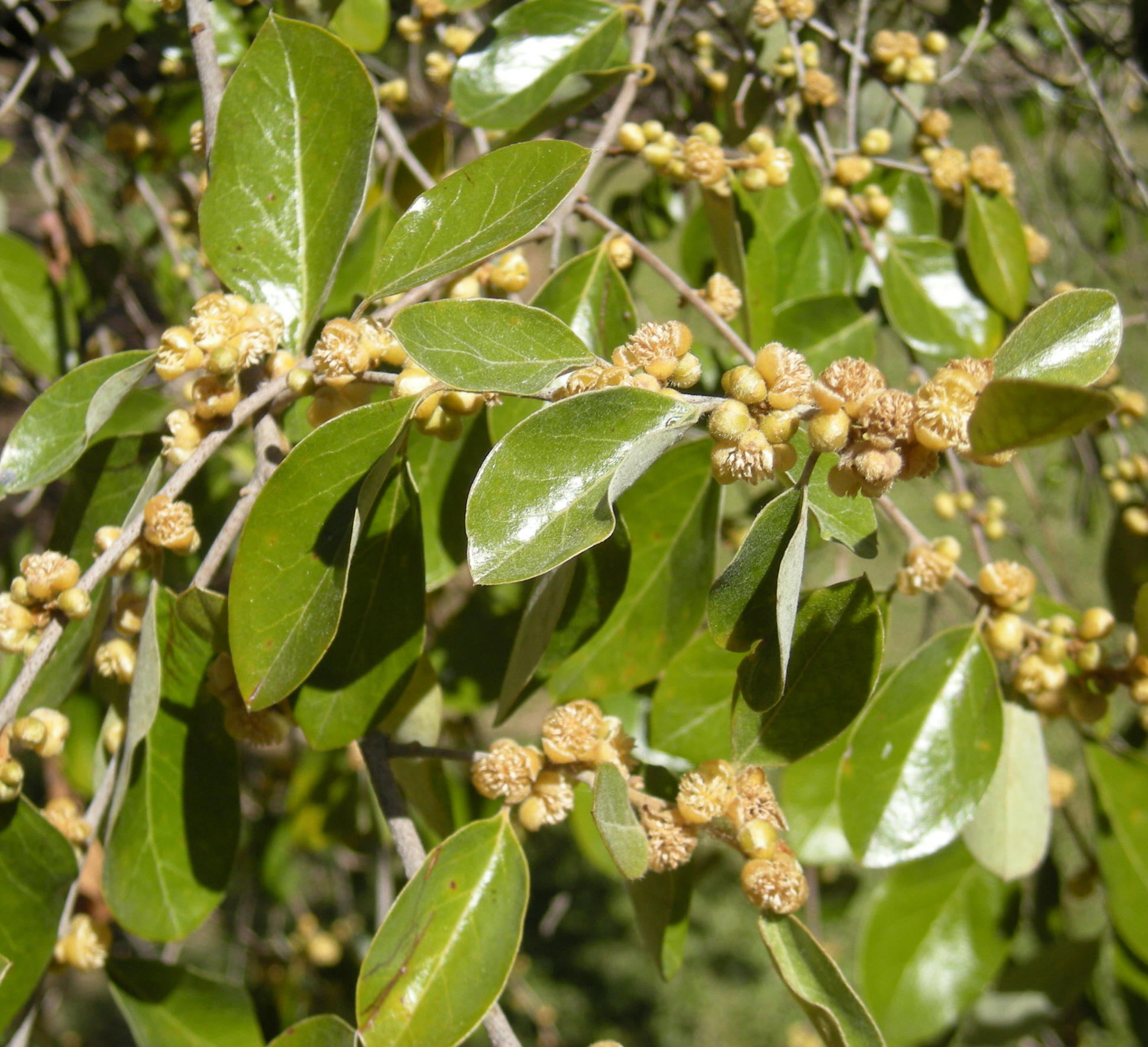
Petalostigma pubescens (hollyspurge family; type genus Picrodendron not shown)

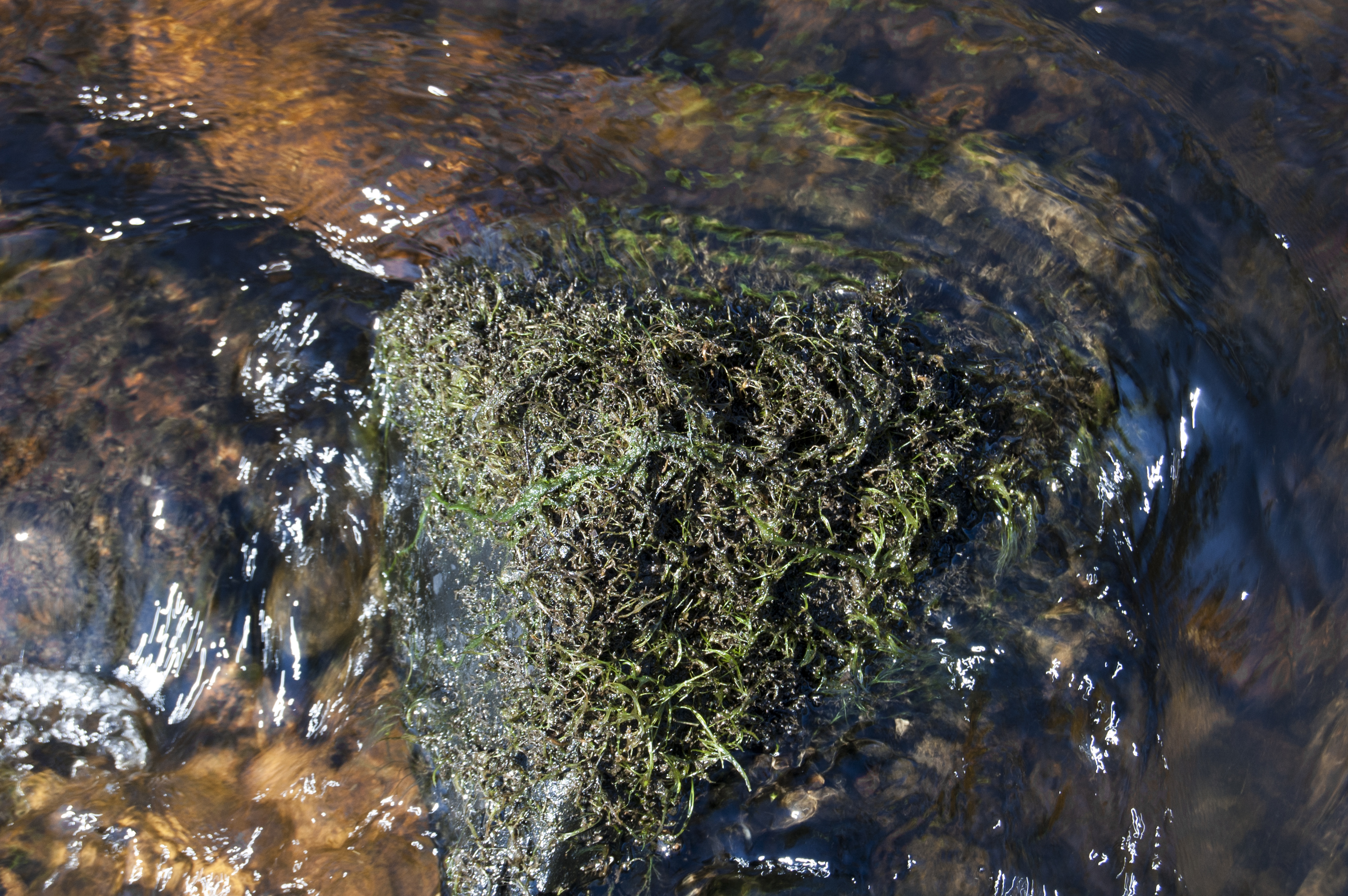
Podostemum ceratophyllum (riverweed family)

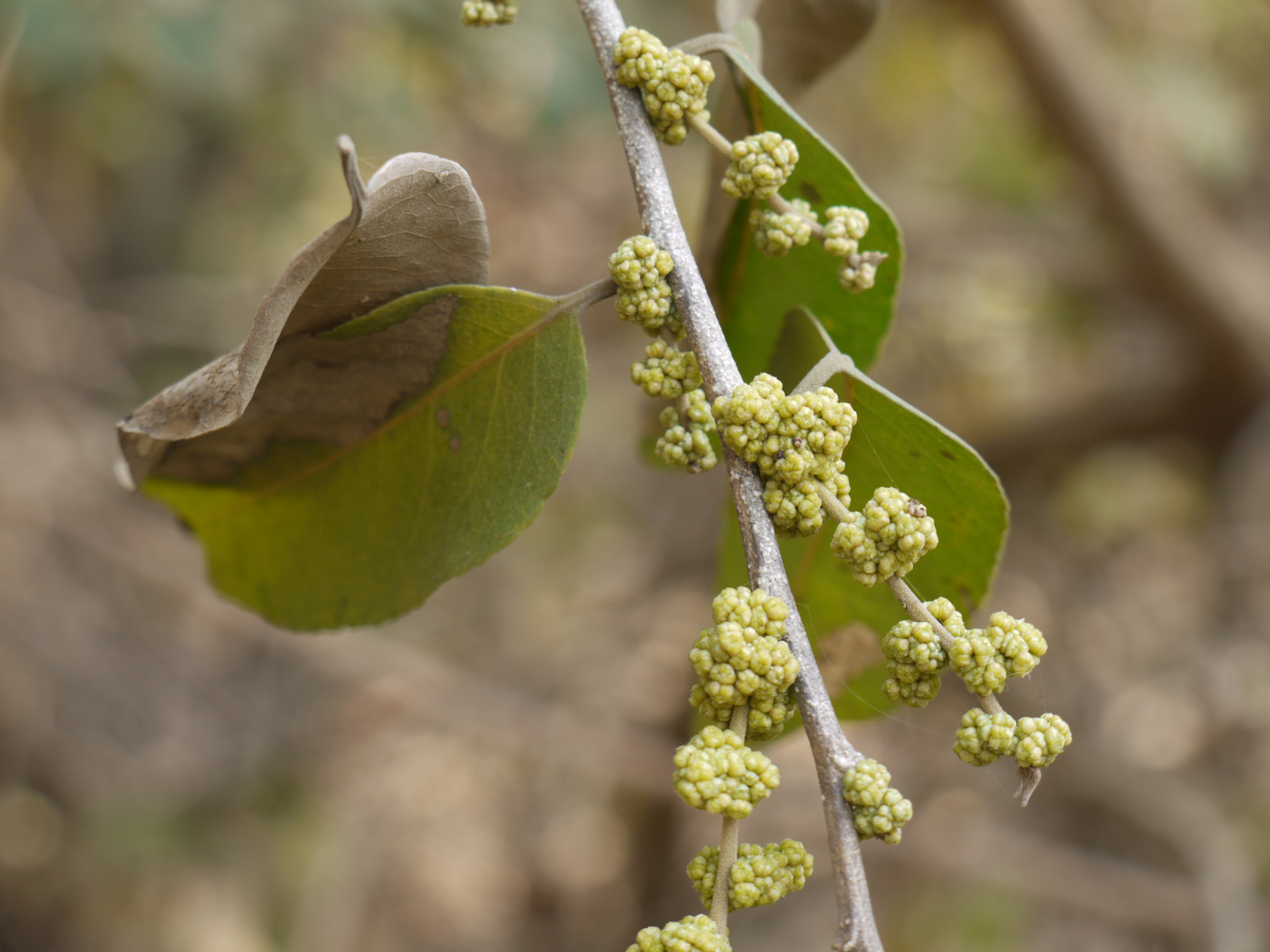
Putranjiva roxburghii (childlife-tree family)

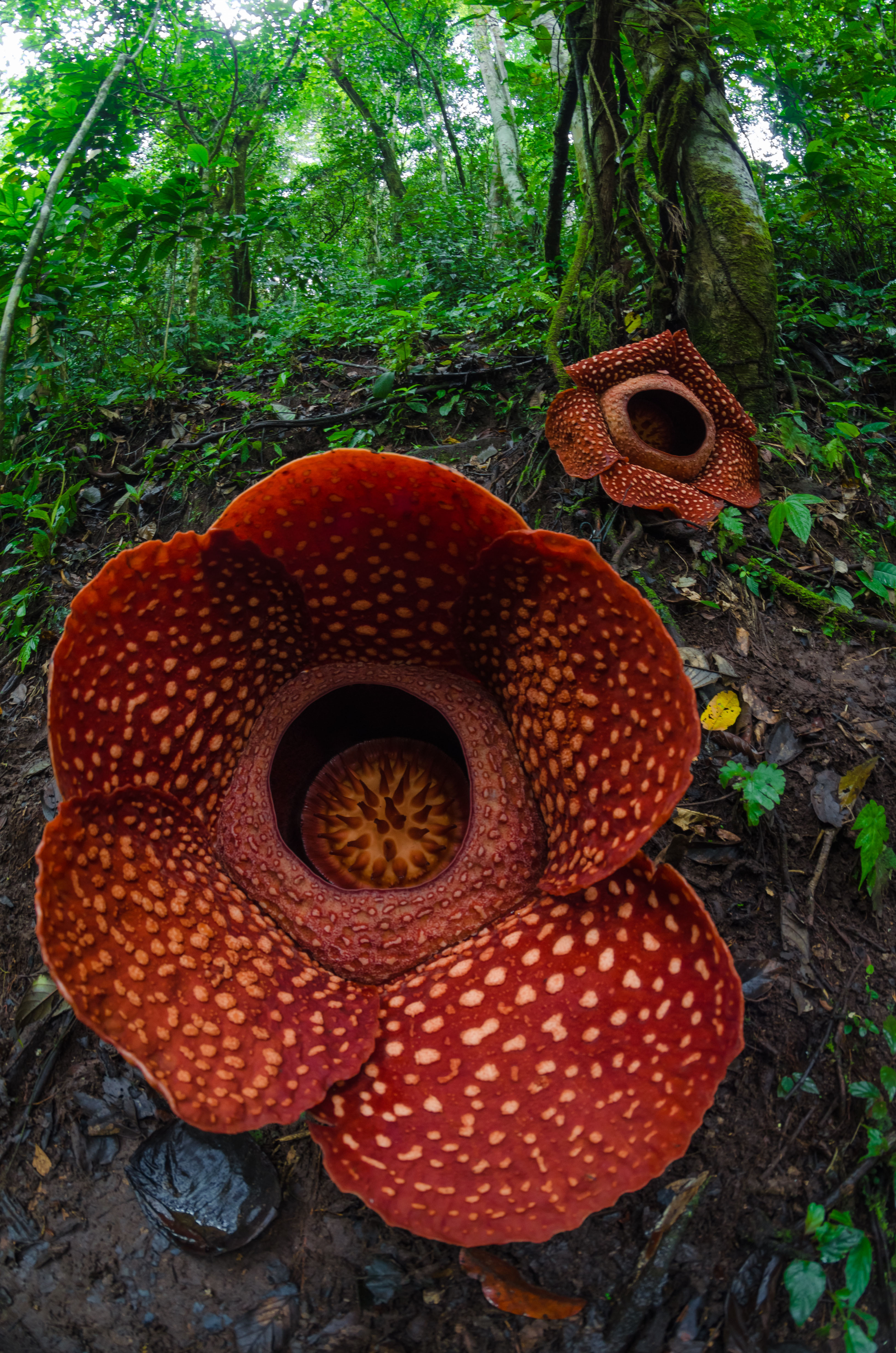
Rafflesia arnoldii (corpse-flower family)

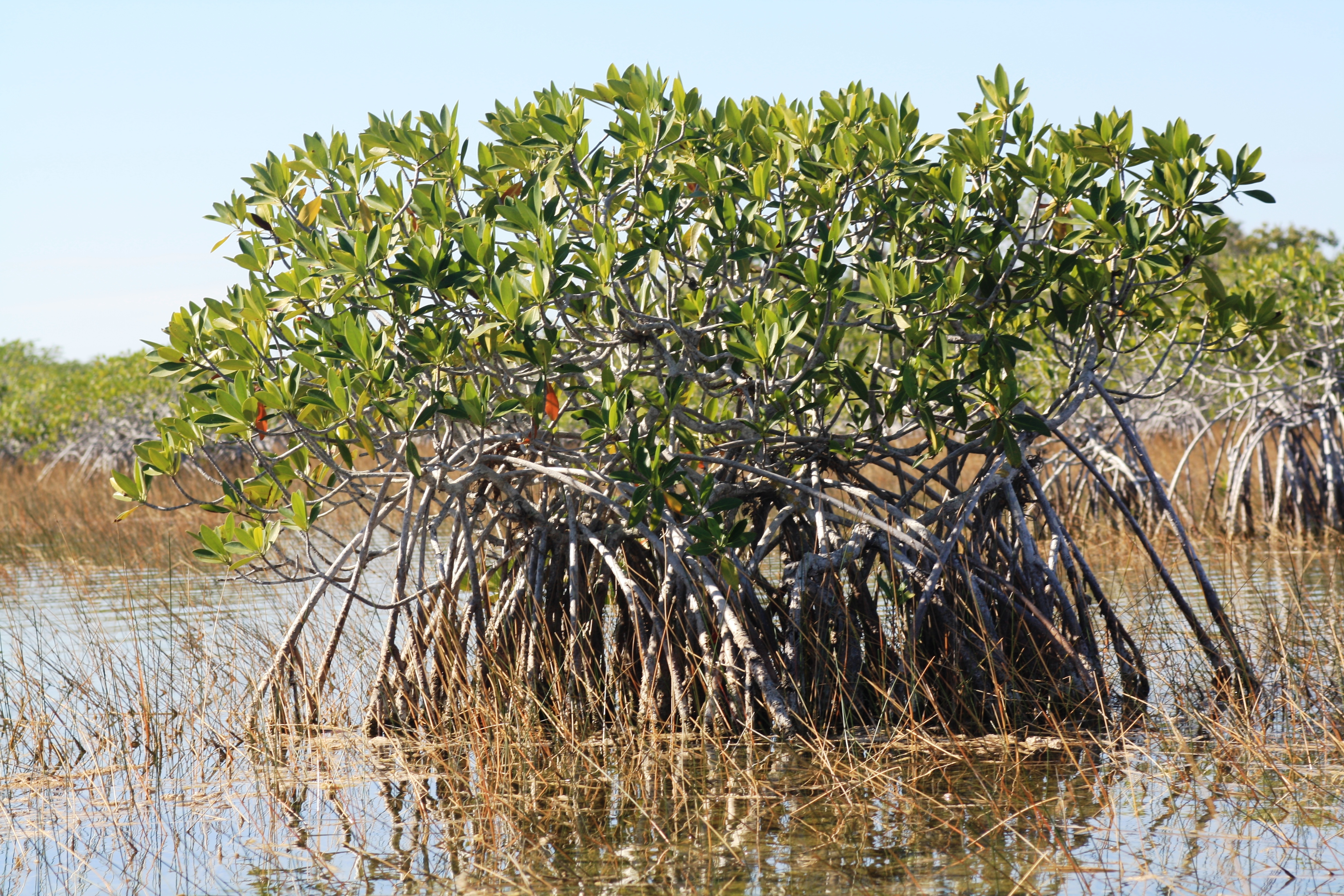
Rhizophora mangle (mangrove family)

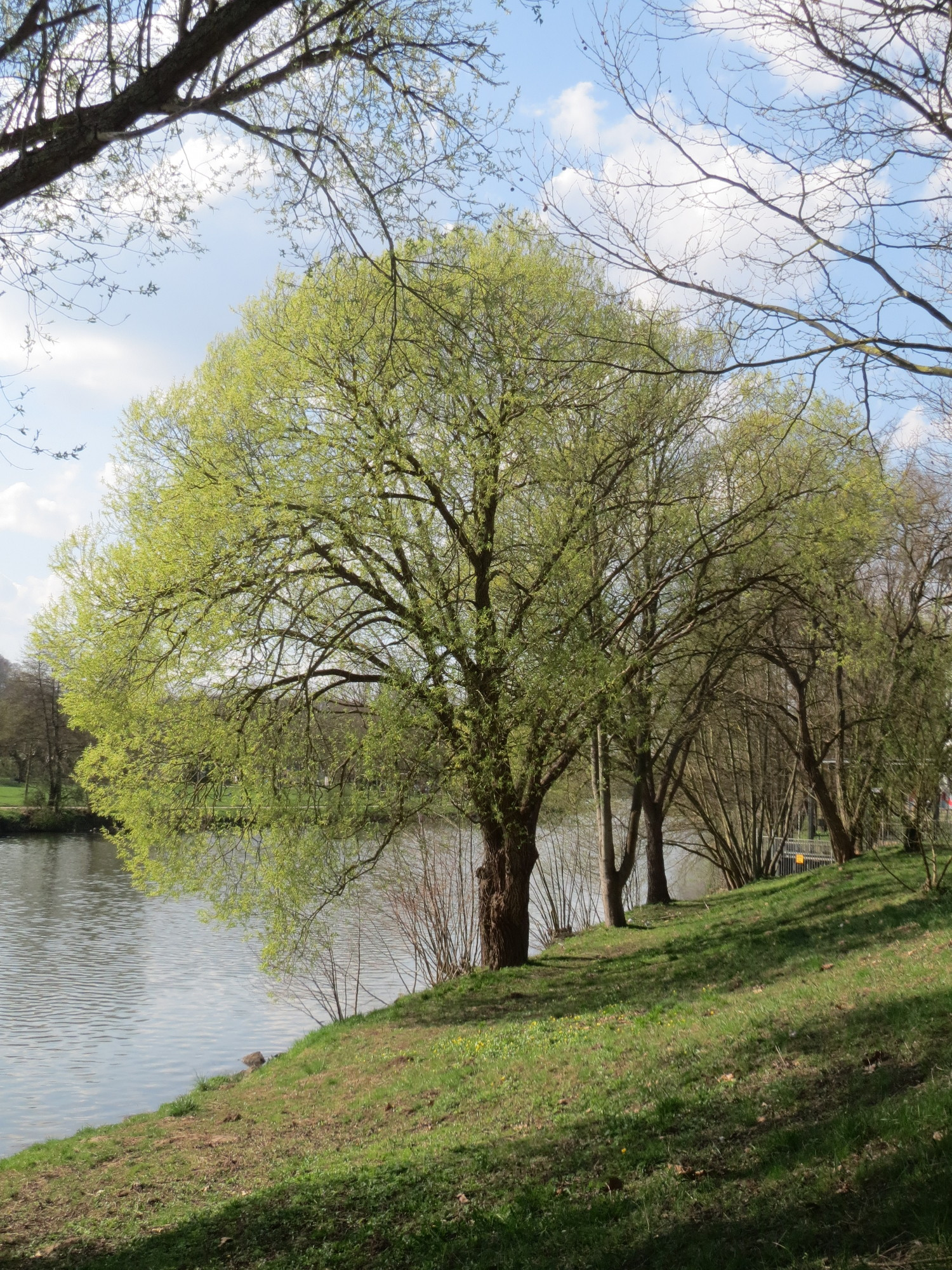
Salix alba (willow family)

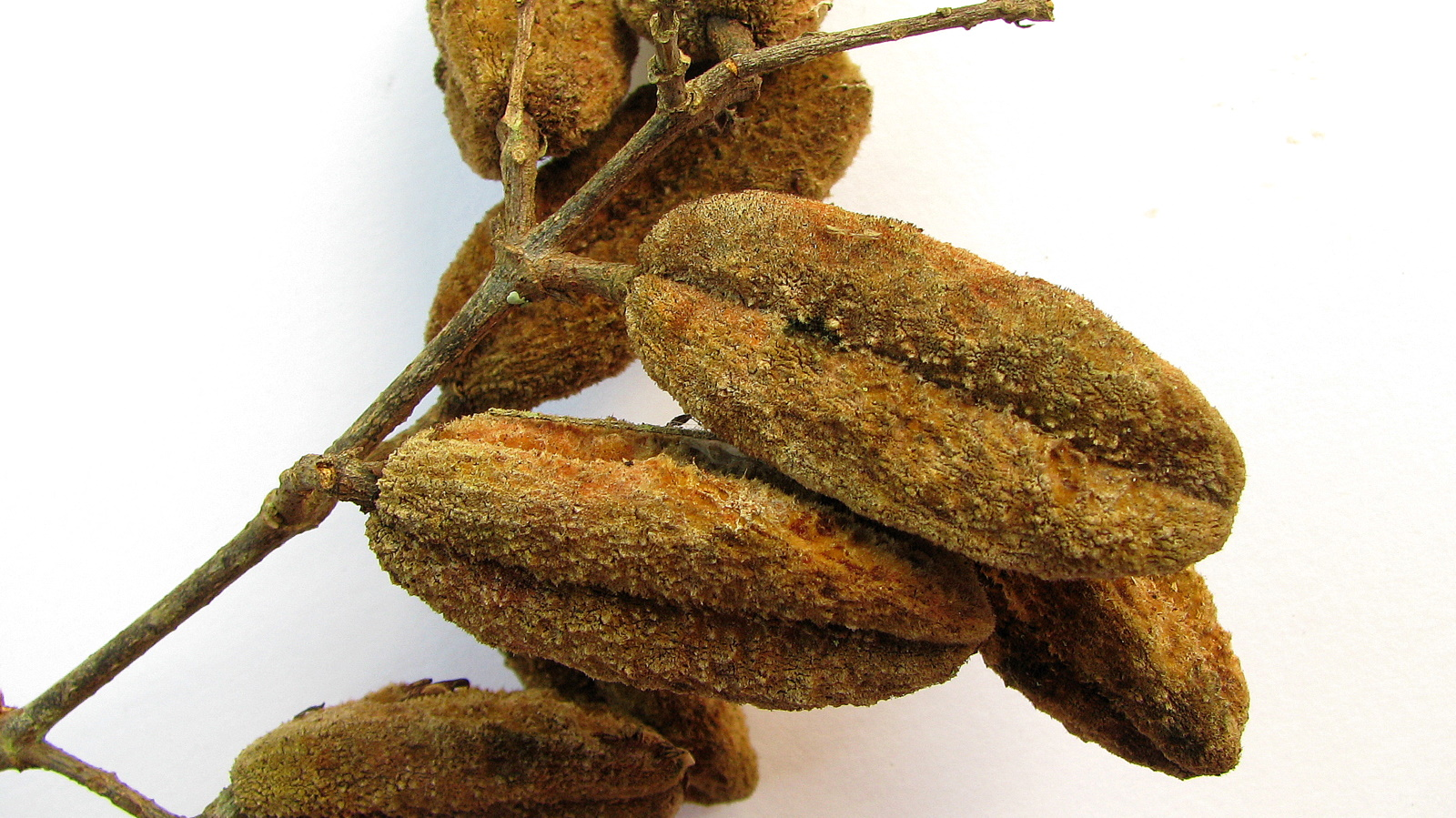
Trigonia nivea (triangle-vine family)

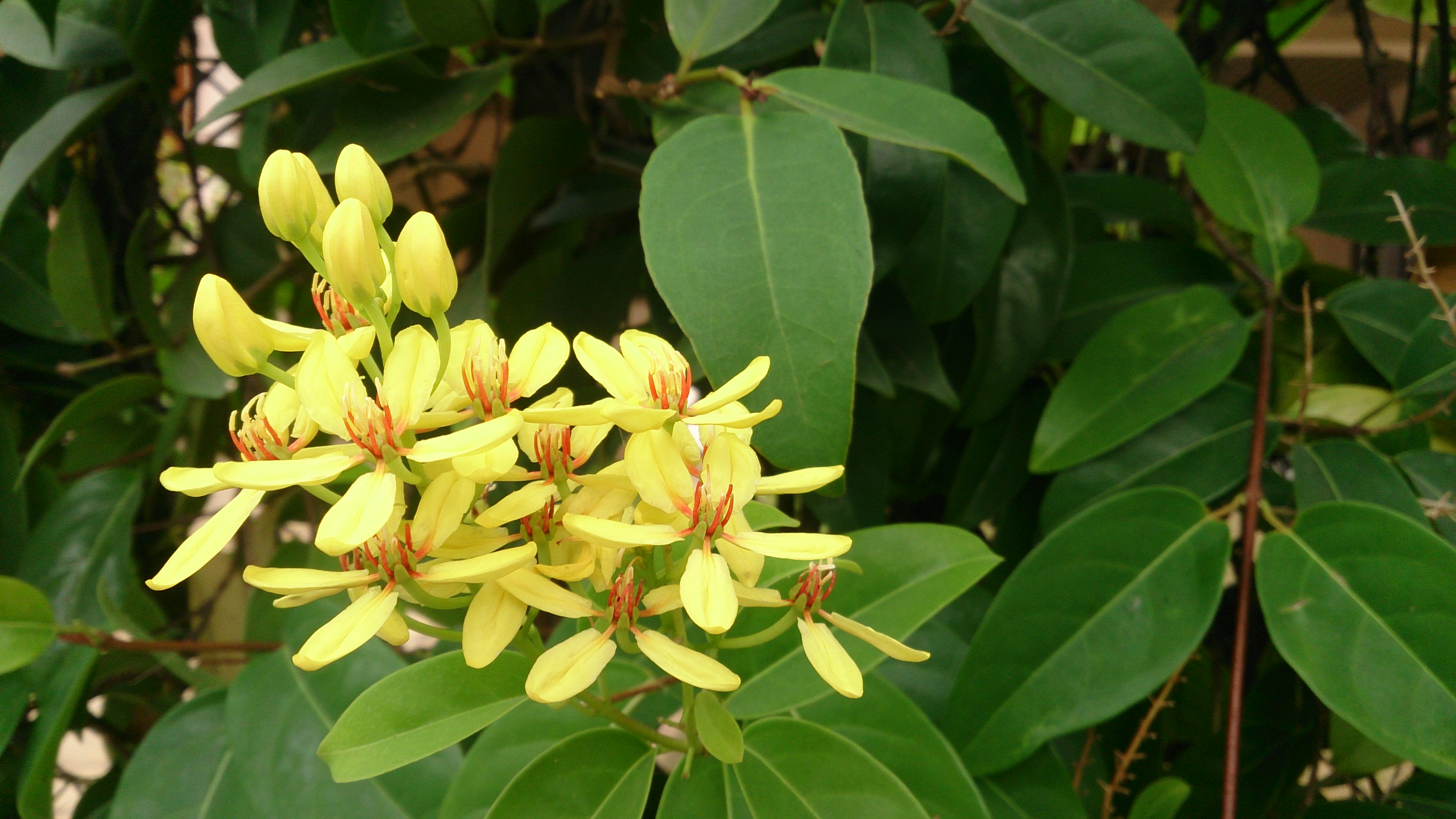
Tristellateia australasiae (Malpighiaceae family)

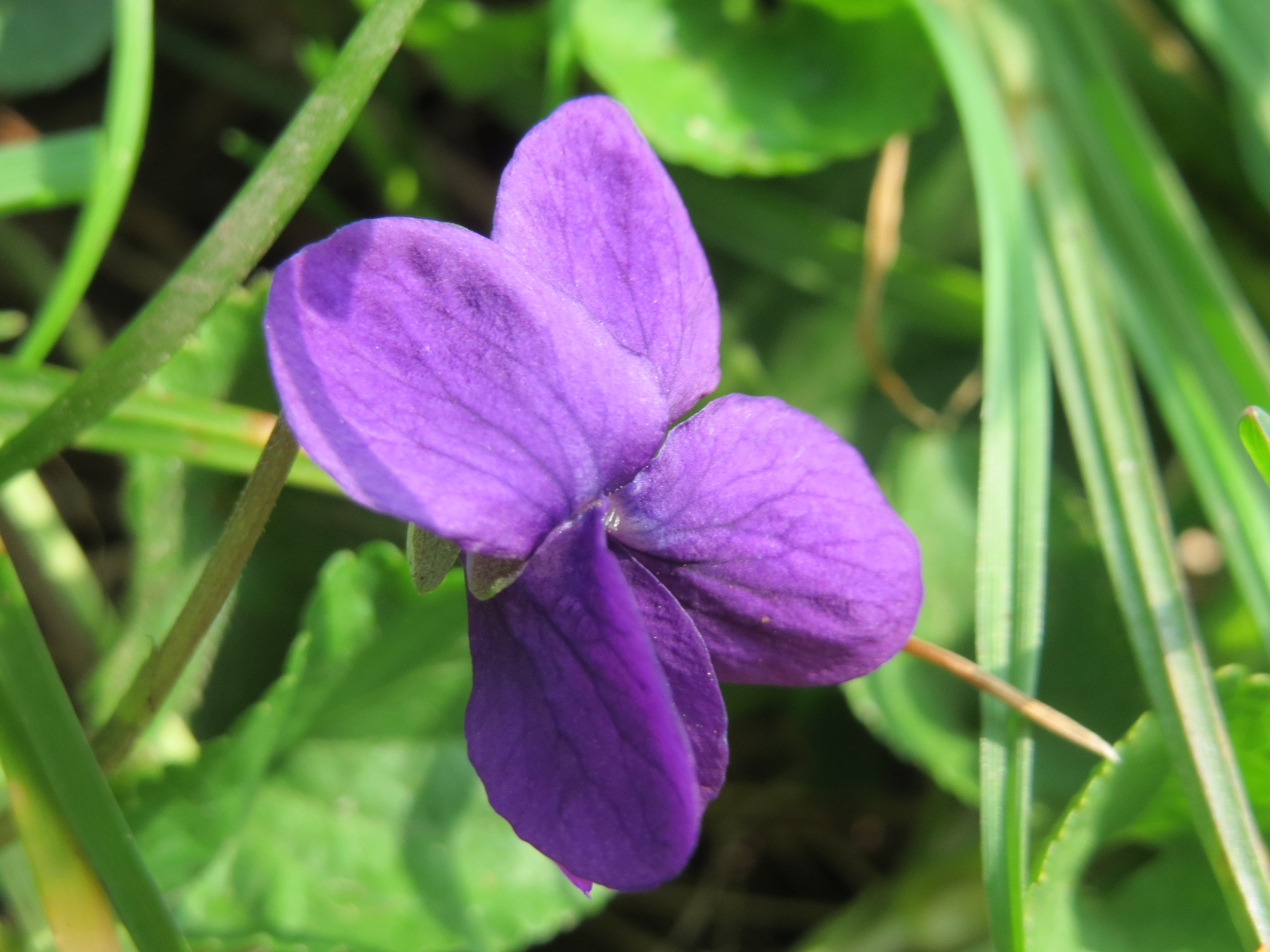
Viola odorata (violet family)

"Litoh family" is a common name for Ctenolophonaceae, and "koteb family" for Lophopyxidaceae.

== Bibliography ==
- Christenhusz, Maarten J. M.; Fay, Michael F.; Chase, Mark W. (2017). "Salicaceae". Plants of the World: An Illustrated Encyclopedia of Vascular Plants. University of Chicago Press. pp. 329–330. ISBN 978-0-226-52292-0.
- Angiosperm Phylogeny Group IV (2016). "An update of the Angiosperm Phylogeny Group classification for the orders and families of flowering plants: APG IV". Botanical Journal of the Linnean Society. 181 (1): 1–20. doi:10.1111/boj.12385.
- Cai, Liming; Xi, Zhenxiang; Amorim, André M.; Sugumaran, M.; Rest, Joshua S.; Liu, Liang; Davis, Charles C. (January 2019). "Widespread ancient whole-genome duplications in Malpighiales coincide with Eocene global climatic upheaval". New Phytologist. 221 (1): 565–576. doi:10.1111/nph.15357. PMC 6265113. PMID 30030969.
- Endress, Peter K.; Davis, Charles C.; Matthews, Merran L. (May 2013). "Advances in the floral structural characterization of the major subclades of Malpighiales, one of the largest orders of flowering plants". Annals of Botany. 111 (5): 969–985. doi:10.1093/aob/mct056. PMC 3631340. PMID 23486341.
- Cole, Theodor C H (2018). "Malpighiales Phylogeny Poster".
- Stevens, P.F. (2020) [2001]. "Malpighiales". AP Web v. 14. Missouri Botanical Garden. Archived from the original on 19 August 2016. (see also Angiosperm Phylogeny Website)
