= Lophopyxis =

Scientific classification
- Kingdom: Plantae
- Clade: Tracheophytes
- Clade: Angiosperms
- Clade: Eudicots
- Clade: Rosids
- Order: Malpighiales
- Family: Lophopyxidaceae; H.Pfeiff.
- Genus: Lophopyxis; Hook.

Species
- Lophopyxis maingayi; Et al.

Genus of flowering plants

Lophopyxis is a genus of flowering plants and the sole genus of the family Lophopyxidaceae. The group consists of two species of tendrillate lianas. They are found in the Sunda Islands.
