= Ctenolophon =

Ctenolophon Temporal range: Late Cretaceous - recent

Scientific classification
- Kingdom: Plantae
- Clade: Embryophytes
- Clade: Tracheophytes
- Clade: Spermatophytes
- Clade: Angiosperms
- Clade: Eudicots
- Clade: Rosids
- Order: Malpighiales
- Family: Ctenolophonaceae; Exell & Mendonça
- Genus: Ctenolophon; Oliv.

Species
- 2; see text

Genus of flowering plants

Ctenolophon is the only genus in the flowering plant family Ctenolophonaceae. It has two recognized species:

- Ctenolophon englerianus Mildbr. – central Africa (Nigeria, Gabon, Zaire, Angola)
- Ctenolophon parvifolius Oliv. – New Guinea and southeast Asia (Thailand, Malaysia, Borneo, Sumatra, Philippines)

This family is well-represented in fossil pollen from the Late Cretaceous onwards. Based on fossils, it was formerly also found in northern South America, the Arabian Peninsula, and the Indian Subcontinent.
