= List of COM-clade families =

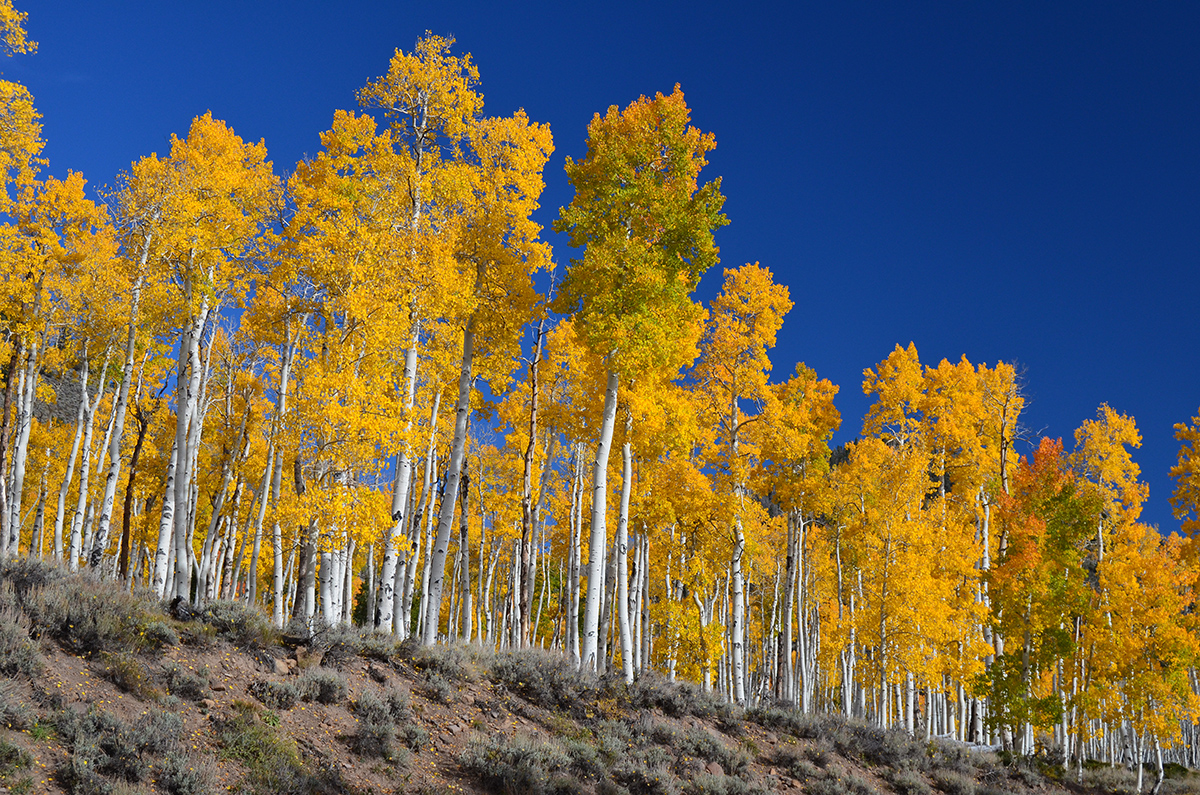
Pando, an 80,000-year-old grove of quaking aspen in the US state of Utah

The COM clade consists of, and is named for, three orders of flowering plants: Celastrales, Oxalidales and Malpighiales. (Note: The taxonomy (classification) in this list follows Plants of the World (2017) and APG IV. Total counts of genera for each family come from Plants of the World Online (POWO). (See the POWO license.) Extinct taxa are not included. A clade of plants is a subgroup consisting of all the descendants of a theoretical ancient ancestor.) A subgroup of the rosids, it is divided into 45 families of trees, shrubs, vines and herbaceous perennials and annuals.

Coca leaves, containing small amounts of cocaine, have been chewed as a stimulant for thousands of years in the Andes. Cassava crops provide a substantial source of carbohydrates in the tropics. Bruguiera, Rhizophora and other mangroves are planted to protect coasts from storms and to anchor beach sand. A single rootstock that supports a grove of quaking aspen may be the world's oldest living individual plant, at around 80,000 years. Hybrids of the wild pansy (Viola tricolor) and other species of the violet family are grown as ornamentals, even in temperate winters.

== Glossary ==
From the glossary of botanical terms:

- annual: a plant species that completes its life cycle within a single year or growing season
- basal: attached close to the base (of a plant or an evolutionary tree diagram)
- climber: a vine that leans on, twines around or clings to other plants for vertical support
- deciduous: falling seasonally, as with bark, leaves or petals
- glandular hair: a hair tipped with a secretory structure
- herbaceous: not woody; usually green and soft in texture
- perennial: not an annual or biennial
- succulent (adjective): juicy or fleshy
- unisexual: of one sex; bearing only male or only female reproductive organs
- woody: hard and lignified; not herbaceous

The APG IV system is the fourth in a series of plant taxonomies from the Angiosperm Phylogeny Group. In this system, Celastrales is basal within the COM clade.

== Families ==
Families
Family and a common name (Note: Each family's formal name ends in the Latin suffix -aceae and is derived from the name of a genus that is or once was part of the family.)	Type genus and etymology (Note: Some plants were named for naturalists (unless otherwise noted).)	Total genera; global distribution	Description and uses	Order	Type genus images
Achariaceae (chaulmoogra family)	Acharia, for Erik Acharius (1757–1819)	31 genera, in the tropics	Shrubs, trees and herbaceous plants with essentially unisexual flowers. Some species are harvested for their wood.	Malpighiales	Acharia tragodes
Balanopaceae (pimplebark family)	Balanops, from Greek for "acorn-like"	1 genus, from northeastern Australia to Fiji	Unisexual evergreen shrubs and trees with lenticels, horizontal ruptures in the bark that allow gas exchange	Malpighiales	Balanops australiana
Bonnetiaceae (cascarilla family)	Bonnetia, for Charles Bonnet (1720–1793)	4 genera, in Southeast Asia and the tropics of the Americas	Shrubs and trees with durable wood	Malpighiales	Bonnetia stricta
Brunelliaceae (palo-bobo family)	Brunellia, for Gabriele Brunelli (1728–1797), an Italian clergyman and botanist	1 genus, in the tropics of the Americas	Evergreen trees	Oxalidales	Brunellia comocladifolia
Calophyllaceae (takamaka family)	Calophyllum, from Greek for "beautiful leaves"	11 genera, in the tropics	Evergreen trees that exude copious white or yellow sap. Mesua ferrea is one of the species called ironwood for its very sturdy heartwood.	Malpighiales	Calophyllum brasiliense
Caryocaraceae (souari-tree family)	Caryocar, from Greek for "nut heart"	2 genera, in the tropics of the Americas	Shrubs and trees, pollinated by bats. Caryocar yields edible nuts.	Malpighiales	Caryocar brasiliense
Celastraceae (spindle family)	Celastrus, from a Greek plant name	98 genera, worldwide	Shrubs, trees, vines and herbaceous plants, some growing on other plants. The fruits or seeds of some species are edible.	Celastrales	Celastrus orbiculatus
Centroplacaceae (biku-biku family)	Centroplacus, from Greek for "spurred and flat" (styles)	2 genera, in the Asian tropics and West Africa	Evergreen trees, frequently with buttress roots	Malpighiales	Centroplacus glaucinus
Cephalotaceae (Albany-pitcherplant family)	Cephalotus, from Greek for "head-like"	1 genus, found only in swamps in southwestern Australia	Carnivorous evergreen herbaceous perennials. Pitchers (modified leaves) trap and digest insects and other small animals.	Oxalidales	Cephalotus follicularis
Chrysobalanaceae (cocoplum family)	Chrysobalanus, from Greek for "gold acorns"	27 genera, in the tropics, mostly in the Americas	Shrubs and trees, many with edible fruit	Malpighiales	Chrysobalanus icaco
Clusiaceae (mangosteen family)	Clusia, for Carolus Clusius (1526–1609)	20 genera, in the tropics	Mostly unisexual evergreen trees and shrubs. The creamy, sweet-and-sour fruit of the mangosteen is grown commercially.	Malpighiales	Clusia rosea
Connaraceae (zebrawood family)	Connarus, from a Greek plant name	12 genera, mostly in the African and Asian tropics	Vines, shrubs and small trees. Fibrous vines of Agelaea are used to make rope.	Oxalidales	Connarus wightii
Ctenolophonaceae (litoh family)	Ctenolophon, from Greek for "comb hills"	1 genus, in West Africa and Southeast Asia	Trees with buttress roots	Malpighiales	—
Cunoniaceae (butterspoon-tree family)	Cunonia, for Johann Christian Cuno (b. 1708)	27 genera, mostly scattered in the Southern Hemisphere	Mostly evergreen shrubs and trees. Some Davidsonia and Schizomeria fruits are edible.	Oxalidales	Cunonia capensis
Dichapetalaceae (ratbane family)	Dichapetalum, from Greek for "two-part petals"	3 genera, in the tropics, subtropical India and southern Africa	Shrubs, trees and woody vines	Malpighiales	Dichapetalum gelonioides
Elaeocarpaceae (fairy-petticoats family)	Elaeocarpus, from Greek for "olive (or oil) fruit"	12 genera, mostly in the tropics and subtropics of Asia and the Americas	Evergreen and partly deciduous shrubs and trees. Fruits of some Aceratium and Elaeocarpus species are edible.	Oxalidales	Elaeocarpus serratus
Elatinaceae (waterwort family)	Elatine, from a Greek plant name	2 genera, scattered worldwide	Herbaceous plants and subshrubs in aquatic or damp habitats	Malpighiales	Elatine hydropiper
Erythroxylaceae (coca family)	Erythroxylum, from Greek for "red wood"	4 genera, in the tropics, mostly in the Americas	Trees and shrubs, some with opaque sap. Coca leaves were a trading commodity for the Incas.	Malpighiales	Erythroxylum coca
Euphorbiaceae (spurge family)	Euphorbia, from a Greek plant name	227 genera, around the world	Trees, shrubs, herbaceous plants and a few vines, usually unisexual, and frequently succulent with opaque sap. Members of this family are grown for food, as ornamentals, and for their wood, latex and seed oil. The latex of Hevea brasiliensis is the most common source of natural rubber.	Malpighiales	Euphorbia antiquorum
Euphroniaceae (euphronia family)	Euphronia, for Euphronis, an ancient writer on cultivation	1 genus, in South America	Shrubs and trees with spidery hairs	Malpighiales	Euphronia hirtelloides
Goupiaceae (kopi family)	Goupia, from a Ndyuka plant name	1 genus, in Central and South America	Evergreen trees that bioaccumulate aluminium	Malpighiales	Goupia glabra
Huaceae (Cameroon-garlic family)	Hua, for Henri Hua (1861–1919), a French botanist	2 genera, in tropical Africa	Shrubs and trees. Leaves, seeds and stems are used as a garlicky seasoning.	Oxalidales	Afrostyrax lepidophyllus (type genus not shown)
Humiriaceae (umiri family)	Humiria, from a Carib plant name	8 genera, mostly in South and Central America	Evergreen shrubs and trees, many with scented wood. The seed oils are used in the Amazon rainforest.	Malpighiales	Humiria balsamifera
Hypericaceae (St.-John's-wort family)	Hypericum, from a Greek plant name	6 genera, around the world	Shrubs and herbaceous plants, often with yellow or purple resin. Some species are grown as ornamentals.	Malpighiales	Hypericum canariense
Irvingiaceae (ogbono-nut family)	Irvingia, for Edward Irving (1816–1855)	4 genera, in the African and Asian tropics	Evergreen trees, some as tall as 90 m (300 ft), with very sturdy wood. Nutritious Irvingia seeds are grown as a cash crop in Cameroon.	Malpighiales	Irvingia smithii
Ixonanthaceae (twentymen-tree family)	Ixonanthes, from Greek for "sticky flowers"	4 genera, mostly in the tropics	Shrubs and trees	Malpighiales	Ixonanthes reticulata
Lacistemataceae (cemp-wood family)	Lacistema, from Latin for "torn" + Greek for "stamens"	2 genera, in the tropics of the Americas	Small trees and shrubs, most with hairs on the new branches	Malpighiales	Lacistema hasslerianum
Lepidobotryaceae (snail-cedar family)	Lepidobotrys, from Greek for "scale clusters"	2 genera, in the tropics of the Americas and Central Africa	Unisexual trees	Celastrales	Lepidobotrys staudtii
Linaceae (flax family)	Linum, from a Latin plant name	9 genera, mostly in the tropics, with some species extending into temperate zones	Trees, shrubs, woody vines and herbaceous plants. Flax has been grown for over 7,000 years for its seed oil and as a source of linen.	Malpighiales	Linum usitatissimum
Lophopyxidaceae (koteb family)	Lophopyxis, from Greek for "crested box" (on the fruit)	1 genus, in the Malay Peninsula, the Malay Archipelago and Melanesia	Woody vines, shrubs and small trees with tendrils and unisexual flowers	Malpighiales	—
Malpighiaceae (acerola family)	Malpighia, for Marcello Malpighi (1628–1694)	77 genera, in the tropics and subtropics, mostly in the Americas	Trees, shrubs, vines and herbaceous perennials. Acerola cherries (Malpighia emarginata) are grown commercially in the tropics, mainly in Brazil.	Malpighiales	Malpighia glabra
Ochnaceae (Mickey-Mouse-plant family)	Ochna, from a Greek plant name	36 genera, in the tropics, mainly in Brazil	Evergreens, mostly shrubs and trees. Ochna, the Mickey-Mouse plant, is often grown in tropical gardens. Lophira is grown for its seed oil.	Malpighiales	Ochna thomasiana
Oxalidaceae (wood-sorrel family)	Oxalis, from a Greek plant name meaning "sharp"	5 genera, worldwide	Trees, shrubs, vines and mostly perennial herbaceous plants, with some succulents. Oxalis tuberosa is a mainly South American food crop, similar to potatoes. Carambola is a juicy tropical fruit.	Oxalidales	Oxalis acetosella
Pandaceae (kana-nut family)	Panda, for Paul Panda Farnana (1888–1930)	3 genera, in the African and Asian tropics	Unisexual shrubs and trees. Panda oleosa is grown for seed oil in West Africa.	Malpighiales	Panda oleosa
Passifloraceae (passionfruit family)	Passiflora, from Latin for "passion flowers"	30 genera, mostly in the tropics	Small trees, shrubs, herbaceous plants and vines with tendrils, frequently with glandular hairs. Maracuja is cultivated for its fruit. Passiflora (especially P. caerulea), Turnera and Piriqueta are grown as ornamentals.	Malpighiales	Passiflora incarnata
Peraceae (lightning-bush family)	Pera, from Greek for "pouch" (on the fruit)	5 genera, in Africa, the tropics of the Americas, and southern, southwestern and southeastern Asia	Herbaceous perennials, shrubs and trees, usually unisexual	Malpighiales	Pera glabrata
Phyllanthaceae (leafflower family)	Phyllanthus, from Greek for "leaf-flowers"	58 genera, mostly in the Malay Archipelago	Mostly shrubs, trees and herbaceous plants, with some climbers, succulents and aquatic species. Some plants have edible fruit, consumed locally.	Malpighiales	Phyllanthus niruri
Picrodendraceae (hollyspurge family)	Picrodendron, from Greek for "bitter tree"	25 genera, in the tropics, mostly south of the equator	Shrubs and trees with unisexual flowers. Lebombo ironwood provides durable wood for floors and structural beams in parts of Africa.	Malpighiales	Petalostigma pubescens (type genus not shown)
Podostemaceae (riverweed family)	Podostemum, from Greek for "foot stamens"	51 genera, globally in the tropics and warm temperate zones	Herbaceous aquatic plants with anchoring roots in fast-flowing streams, rapids and waterfalls, many resembling seaweed, lichens or moss. Dried Rhyncholacis is used as a peppery seasoning.	Malpighiales	Podostemum ceratophyllum
Putranjivaceae (childlife-tree family)	Putranjiva, from a Sanskrit plant name	2 genera, in the tropics and subtropics, mainly in Africa and the Malay Archipelago	Mostly unisexual shrubs and trees, with hairy, fleshy fruit. Putranjiva is widely grown in the tropics, as an ornamental and for its seed oil.	Malpighiales	Putranjiva roxburghii
Rafflesiaceae (corpse-flower family)	Rafflesia, for Stamford Raffles (1781–1826)	3 genera, mainly in Southeast Asia	Parasitic plants without chlorophyll, usually with unisexual flowers. They flower infrequently, remaining hidden most of the time inside a host plant. Rafflesia arnoldii can grow up to 1 m (3 ft 3 in) in diameter, a record size for flowers.	Malpighiales	Rafflesia arnoldii
Rhizophoraceae (mangrove family)	Rhizophora, from Greek for "root-bearing"	15 genera, in the tropics	Evergreen shrubs and trees, many with aerial roots adapted to shallow water	Malpighiales	Rhizophora mangle
Salicaceae (willow family)	Salix, from a Latin plant name	54 genera, in tropical, temperate and arctic climates	Trees, shrubs and partly herbaceous plants, most with unisexual flowers. Salix arctica, a willow, grows at the northern limit for vascular plants (83° N). Dovyalis caffra is grown as a hedge with edible fruit in the tropics. The bark of the white willow, Salix alba, contains salicin (related to aspirin), and was used traditionally as a painkiller in Europe.	Malpighiales	Salix alba
Trigoniaceae (triangle-vine family)	Trigonia, from Greek for "triangular" (fruit)	4 genera, in the tropics of the Americas, the Malay Archipelago and Madagascar	Shrubs, trees and woody vines. Trigoniastrum hypoleucum provides high-quality wood.	Malpighiales	Trigonia nivea
Violaceae (violet family)	Viola, from a Latin plant name	24 genera, around the world	Small trees, shrubs, vines and herbaceous plants. V. odorata is an ingredient in perfumes and in jellies, chocolates and other sweets.	Malpighiales	Viola odorata

== See also ==
- List of plant family names with etymologies
