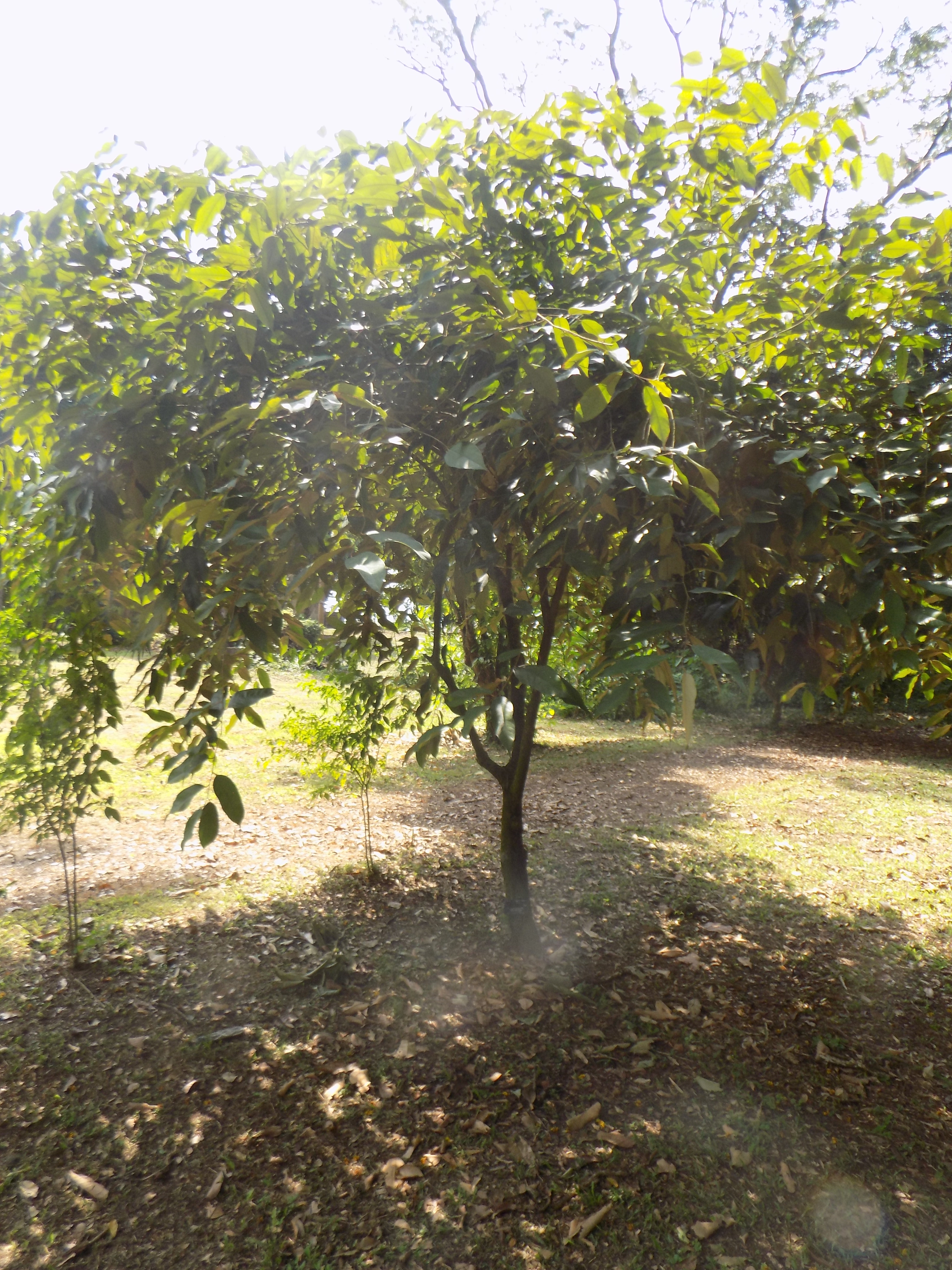
- Afrostyrax lepidophyllus. Jardin botanique de Limbé, Southwest Region, Cameroon

Conservation status
- Least Concern (IUCN 3.1)

Scientific classification
- Kingdom: Plantae
- Clade: Embryophytes
- Clade: Tracheophytes
- Clade: Angiosperms
- Clade: Eudicots
- Clade: Rosids
- Order: Oxalidales
- Family: Huaceae
- Genus: Afrostyrax
- Species: A. lepidophyllus

Binomial name
- Afrostyrax lepidophyllus Mildbr.

= Afrostyrax lepidophyllus =

Species of flowering plant

Afrostyrax lepidophyllus is a species of flowering plant in the family Huaceae. It is found in Cameroon, the Central African Republic, the Republic of the Congo, the Democratic Republic of the Congo, Gabon, and Ghana. It is threatened by habitat loss.

Bark extract of Afrostyrax lepidophyllus has shown pesticidal activity against nematodes and arthropods, including insecticide-resistant strains of lice and blowflies.

The dried nuts of Afrostyrax lepidophyllus are used as a spice with West African dishes. They are called country onions in Ghana and Nigeria, rondelles in Cameroon, bobimbi in the Congo, and sinzakolo in Gabon. They are known for their garlicky, black truffle like flavor.
