= Lucky bean tree =

Lucky bean tree may refer to the following plant species:

- Castanospermum australe
- Erythrina lysistemon
- Putranjiva roxburghii
