= Rooiels =

Rooiels or Rooi-Els may refer to:

- Cunonia capensis, commonly known as rooiels
- Rooi-Els, Western Cape, a village on the eastern shore of False Bay in the Western Cape, South Africa
