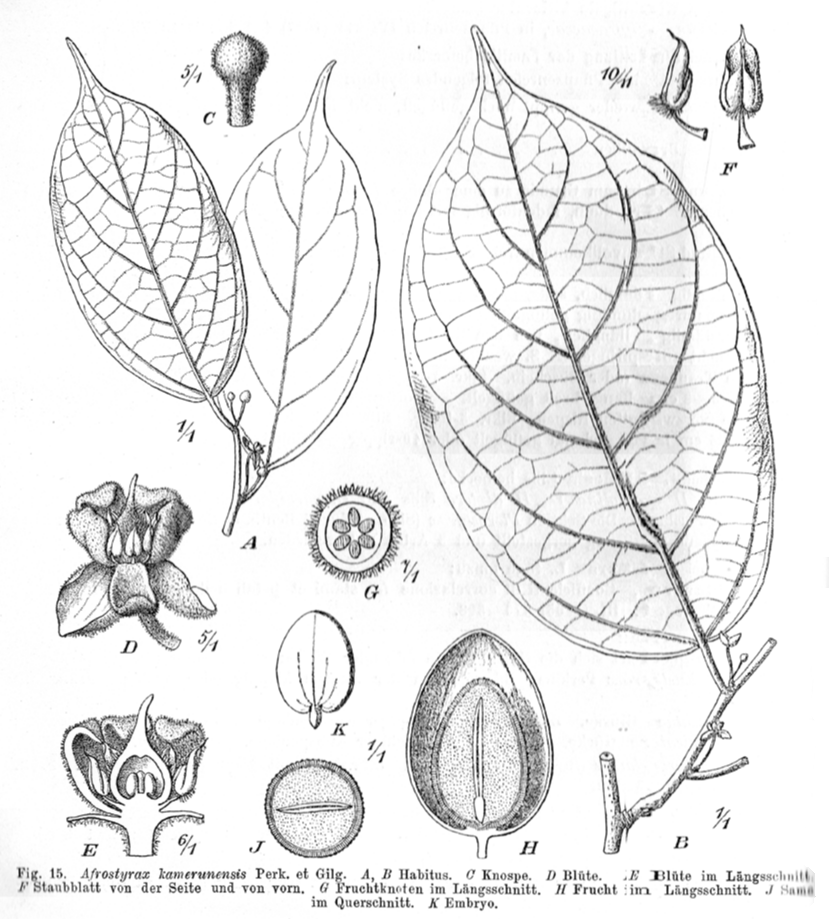
- Afrostyrax kamerunensis

Scientific classification
- Kingdom: Plantae
- Clade: Tracheophytes
- Clade: Angiosperms
- Clade: Eudicots
- Clade: Rosids
- Order: Oxalidales
- Family: Huaceae
- Genus: Afrostyrax; Perkins & Gilg

= Afrostyrax =

Genus of flowering plants

Afrostyrax is a genus of plant in family Huaceae. It contains the following species:

- Afrostyrax kamerunensis Perkins & Gilg
- Afrostyrax lepidophyllus Mildbr.
- Afrostyrax macranthus Mildbr.
