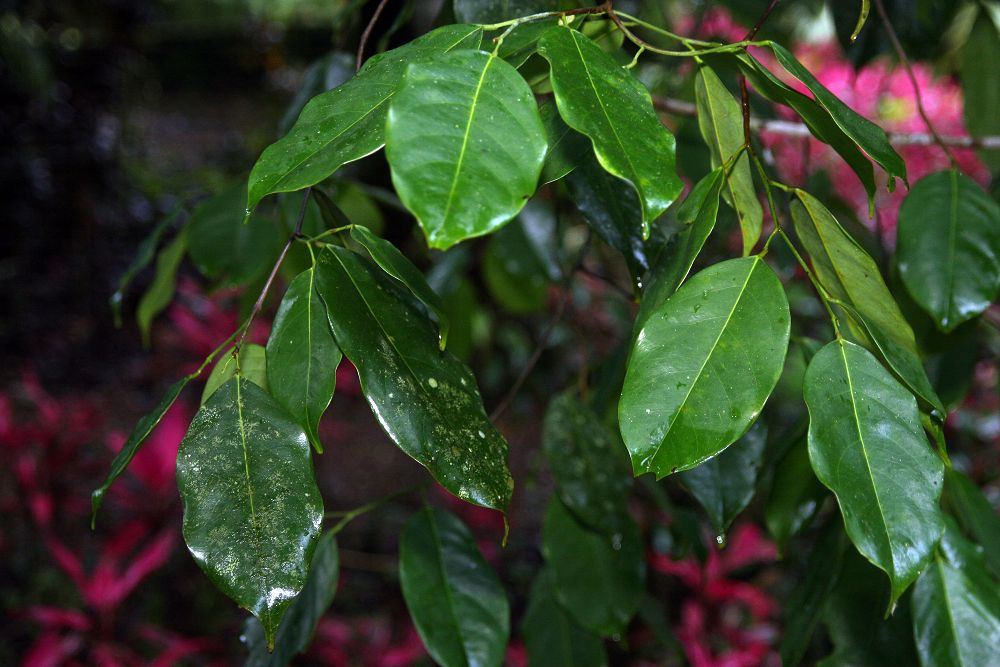

Conservation status
- Least Concern (IUCN 3.1)

Scientific classification
- Kingdom: Plantae
- Clade: Embryophytes
- Clade: Tracheophytes
- Clade: Spermatophytes
- Clade: Angiosperms
- Clade: Eudicots
- Clade: Rosids
- Order: Celastrales
- Family: Lepidobotryaceae
- Genus: Ruptiliocarpon; Hammel & N.Zamora
- Species: R. caracolito

Binomial name
- Ruptiliocarpon caracolito Hammel & N.Zamora

= Ruptiliocarpon =

Species of plant

Ruptiliocarpon is a monotypic genus of flowering plants in the family Lepidobotryaceae. The genus has only one species, Ruptiliocarpon caracolito. It is a tall tree that grows in several small isolated areas of Central and South America. It is known from Costa Rica, Colombia, Peru, and Suriname. It is locally common on hillsides and other well-drained areas, often in red clay, from near sea level to 400 m in elevation.

The seed is surrounded by two endocarps which fall away and litter the ground below. To those who live where it grows, it is known as cedro caracolito, the "little snail cedar", because the larger of the two endocarps resembles a small shell. The wood of Ruptiliocarpon is light and used in cabinet-making, but is often overlooked by wood harvesters.

== Taxonomic history ==
Ruptiliocarpon was named and described by Barry Hammel and Nelson Zamora in the journal Novon in 1993. They saw that it was a close relative of Lepidobotrys and made it the second member of Lepidobotryaceae. In the same paper, they wrote a reassessment of the family.

Novon published two other studies of Ruptiliocarpon in the same issue. They confirmed that Ruptiliocarpon was closely related to Lepidobotrys, but came to no firm conclusions on the relationships of this pair to other groups of rosids. One study found that the wood anatomy of Ruptiliocarpon was very much like that of Lepidobotrys and shared some traits with the wood anatomy of Trichilia, a member of the family Meliaceae. The wood of Ruptiliocarpon was different from the wood of all others to which it was compared in having vestured pits on the walls of its xylem cells. Another study found some similarities in flower structure with Meliaceae, but also found that ovule and seed morphology suggested a relationship with Phyllanthaceae, a family that the authors did not consider to be separate from Euphorbiaceae.

== Names ==
Cedro caracolito is not a cedar in the strictest sense, but in Spanish, the term cedro is applied to a wide variety of trees. In Costa Rica, where most of the specimens were collected, the term cedro, with a qualifying adjective, is applied to Carapa (Meliaceae), Cedrela (Meliaceae), Tapirira (Anacardiaceae), and Calophyllum (Clusiaceae).

Ruptiliocarpon caracolito has long been known to local inhabitants, but it was not named and described in the botanical literature until 1993, when sufficient material for such a description was finally collected. At that time, Barry Hammel and Nelson Zamora named it Ruptiliocarpon caracolito, basing their description mostly on specimens from Costa Rica.

Ruptiliocarpon is a Latin-Greek hybrid name. Ruptilio, in Latin, means "to split irregularly", and "carpon" is the Greek word for fruit. The name describes the characteristic opening of the fruit and is an obvious difference from Lepidobotrys, the other member of the family. Though some language purists frown on the creation of hybrid names, and the ICBN discourages it, Hammel and Zamora created this name because, as they said, "we consider the purely Greek or Latin options decidedly inelegant".

When Hammel and Zamora described Ruptiliocarpon, two other detailed studies of its anatomy were published at the same time. These studies confirmed that Ruptiliocarpon was correctly placed in Lepidobotryaceae, but they were inconclusive about the relationships of Lepidobotryaceae to other families. The authors suggested possible relationships to the Meliaceae and Phyllanthaceae, but it is now known that Lepidobotryaceae belongs in Celastrales.

== Seasons ==
In Costa Rica, R. caracolito blooms in late March and early April, soon after the emergence of new leaves. The flowers are small and green and they attract little attention. Because of this, and because of the short flowering time, flowering material has rarely been collected. The fruits mature by the following January and remain on the tree into February. Trees are easily grown from seed.

== Description ==
Because R. caracolito was not botanically described until 1993, descriptions of Lepidobotryaceae from before that time are obsolete.

The type material for the species is from near Limón, on the Atlantic coast of Costa Rica. It has been reported that the flowers of the South American trees are quite different from those of the Costa Rican trees, but flowering specimens from South America have not been collected.

Ruptiliocarpon caracolito is a tree, 20 to 30 m, or rarely 40 m tall. The trunk is straight and 50 to 90 cm in diameter at breast height.

The leaves are arranged alternately in two rows along the stem. The leaf blade is elliptic in shape and the margin is entire. The leaves appear simple, but are actually compound and unifoliate. The leaf consists of a single leaflet on the end of a rachis. The petiolule is swollen for its entire length and a conspicuous joint separates it from the rachis. This joint bears a single, elongate stipel. There is a pair of fused stipules at the base of the petiole. The stipel and stipules soon fall away. The inflorescence is an irregular arrangement of several spikes attached opposite a leaf.

The flowers are small and green with five sepals and five petals that are nearly alike. The flower bud opens only slightly, producing a small hole in its end. The male and female flowers are only slightly different in appearance, with each tree bearing flowers of only one sex.

The 10 stamens are united into a tube, which secretes nectar. Five anthers are attached to the top of the tube, and between them, five more are mounted on short filaments. The ovary has two compartments that are separated by a partition. The ovules are attached to the partition, near its top. The two stigmas are short and attached directly to the apex of the ovary.

The fruit is a capsule, 2.5 to 3.5 cm long and 1.5 to 2.5 cm wide, containing one, or rarely, two seeds. The capsule breaks up and its pieces fall, leaving the seed and the surrounding endocarps. The endocarps then fall, leaving the seeds hanging on the tree. The seed is shiny and black with its lower third covered by an orange aril.

== Relationships ==
Ruptiliocarpon caracolito is one of only two species in the family Lepidobotryaceae, the other being the small African tree Lepidobotrys staudtii. The two are much alike in being trees with alternate, elliptic, unifoliate leaves in two rows along the twigs. The flowers are small, green or greenish, with five sepals and five petals that are nearly alike, and 10 stamens in two series. The fruit is a capsule with one or rarely, two seeds.

Ruptiliocarpon caracolito differs from L. staudtii in several characters. The stigma is short, rather than elongated, and the ovary has two rather than three compartments. The most obvious differences are in the male parts of the flower and in the opening of the fruit. In R. caracolito, the stamens have filaments that are short and united into a tube, rather than long and fused only at the base. The anthers are basifixed instead of versatile. The capsule ruptures irregularly, instead of splitting along a seam.
