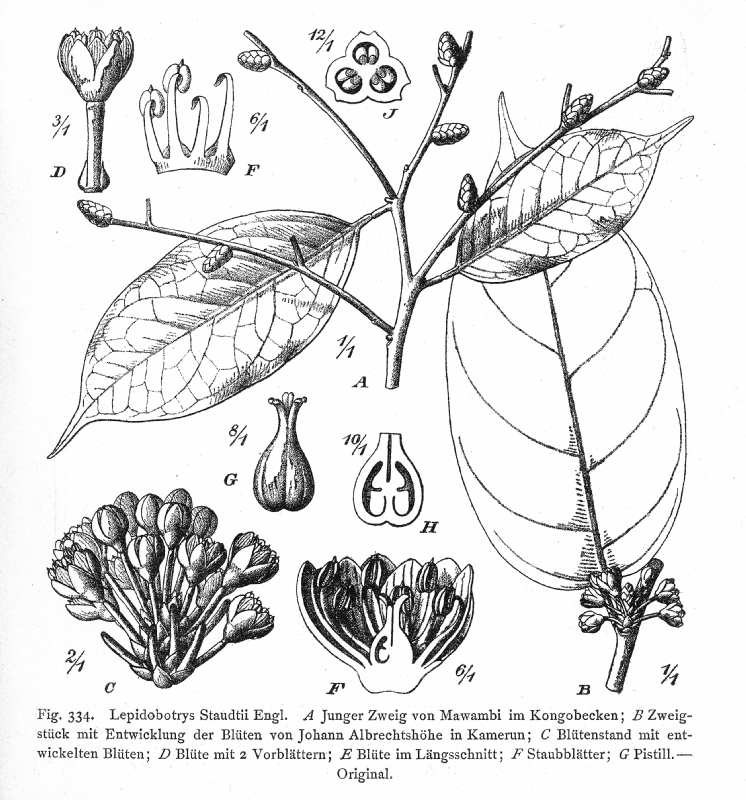
- Lepidobotrys staudtii, from Vegetation der Erde (1915)

Scientific classification
- Kingdom: Plantae
- Clade: Tracheophytes
- Clade: Angiosperms
- Clade: Eudicots
- Clade: Rosids
- Order: Celastrales
- Family: Lepidobotryaceae; J.Léonard

Genera
- Lepidobotrys; Ruptiliocarpon

= Lepidobotryaceae =

Family of flowering plants

Lepidobotryaceae is a family of plants in the order Celastrales. It contains only two species: Lepidobotrys staudtii (native to tropical Africa) and Ruptiliocarpon caracolito (native to South and Central America).

== Description ==
The Lepidobotryaceae are dioecious trees. The leaves are alternate and arranged in two rows along the stems. The blade is elliptical in shape and the margin is entire. The leaves appear simple, but are actually unifoliate. A unifoliate leaf is a type of compound leaf that consists of a single leaflet mounted on the end of a rachis. A joint occurs where the leaflet is attached to the rachis. In Lepidobotryaceae, this joint bears a single, elongate stipel and a pair of small stipules where the petiole attaches to the stem. After the emergence of the leaf, the stipel and stipules soon fall away.

The flowers are produced in small inflorescences opposite the leaves. They are small and greenish with five sepals and five petals. The sepals and petals are similar in size and appearance, free from each other, or very shortly united at the base. In the flower bud, the sepals are arranged quincuncially. This means that two are inside, two are outside, and one of them has one margin exposed and the other covered. The nectary disk is fleshy in Lepidobotrys, but extended into a tube in Ruptiliocarpon. The stamens are in two whorls of five, one whorl opposite the sepals and the other opposite the petals. Those in the outer whorl, opposite the sepals, are longer. The filaments are fused at the base, shortly in Lepidobotrys, but forming an extension of the tubular nectary in Ruptiliocarpon. The pollen is produced in four thecae on each anther. The stigmas are elongated, appearing as false styles, known as stylodia. The ovary is located inside the flower, rather than below. It has two or three locules, with two ovules per locule. The ovules are attached to the partition that separates the locules, near its summit. The fruit is a capsule with one, or rarely, two seeds. The seeds are black and partly covered with an orange aril.

In 2000, a DNA analysis of the eudicots based on the rbcL gene showed that the families Lepidobotryaceae, Parnassiaceae, and Celastraceae form a strongly supported clade. The authors of this study recommended that these three families constitute the order Celastrales. This result was strongly supported by later studies.

The families into which Lepidobotrys had usually been placed, Linaceae and Oxalidaceae, are now placed in the orders Malpighiales and Oxalidales, respectively, which are closely related to Celastrales. The orders Celastrales, Oxalidales, and Malpighiales, along with the unplaced family Huaceae form a group known as the COM clade of the rosids.
