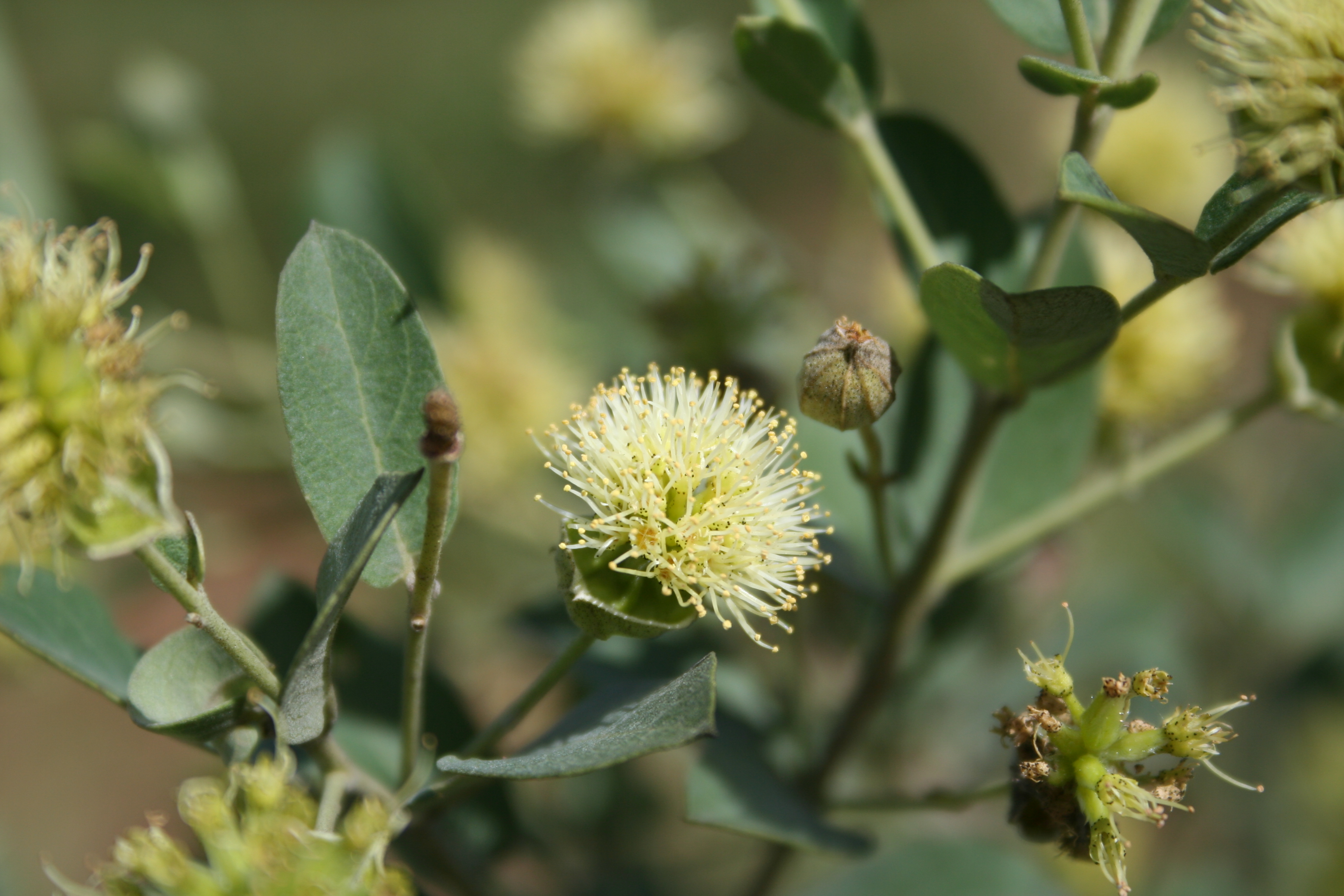
- Inflorescence and flowers of Guiera senegalensis

Scientific classification
- Kingdom: Plantae
- Clade: Tracheophytes
- Clade: Angiosperms
- Clade: Eudicots
- Clade: Rosids
- Order: Myrtales
- Family: Combretaceae
- Genus: Guiera; Adans. ex Juss.
- Species: G. senegalensis

Binomial name
- Guiera senegalensis J.F. Gmel

= Guiera =

Genus of flowering plants

Guiera is a flowering plant genus in the family Combretaceae. Guiera senegalensis is the only known species in the genus, found in Tropical Africa in dry areas from Senegal to Sudan (requiring much sunlight and light dry soil). The plant produces the tannin 3,4,5-Tri-O-galloylquinic acid and several alkaloids of the harmane family.

== Uses ==
The plant as a whole is often decorative, however the leaves are known as a medicinal 'cure-all' in Africa: It is known for being hypotensive, antidiarrhetic, anti-inflammatory, and helpful for coughs.

Its bark yields a marketable gum; its branches are used for baskets, framework, and fences; its roots for toothpicks; and its smoke repels flies.

== Ecology ==
Guiera is a pioneer species, spread via animal dispersal and grows well in impoverished soil.

It is an indicator species of overgrazed land.

== Water pump ==
Guiera naturally "pumps" water to the surface in a process called hydraulic lift or hydraulic redistribution (HR): When grown as a companion plant with millet and other thirsty crops, excess water drawn up by Guiera senegalensis’ deep roots during the night is excreted and becomes available to the surrounding crop, dramatically increasing the yield in the case of millet.
