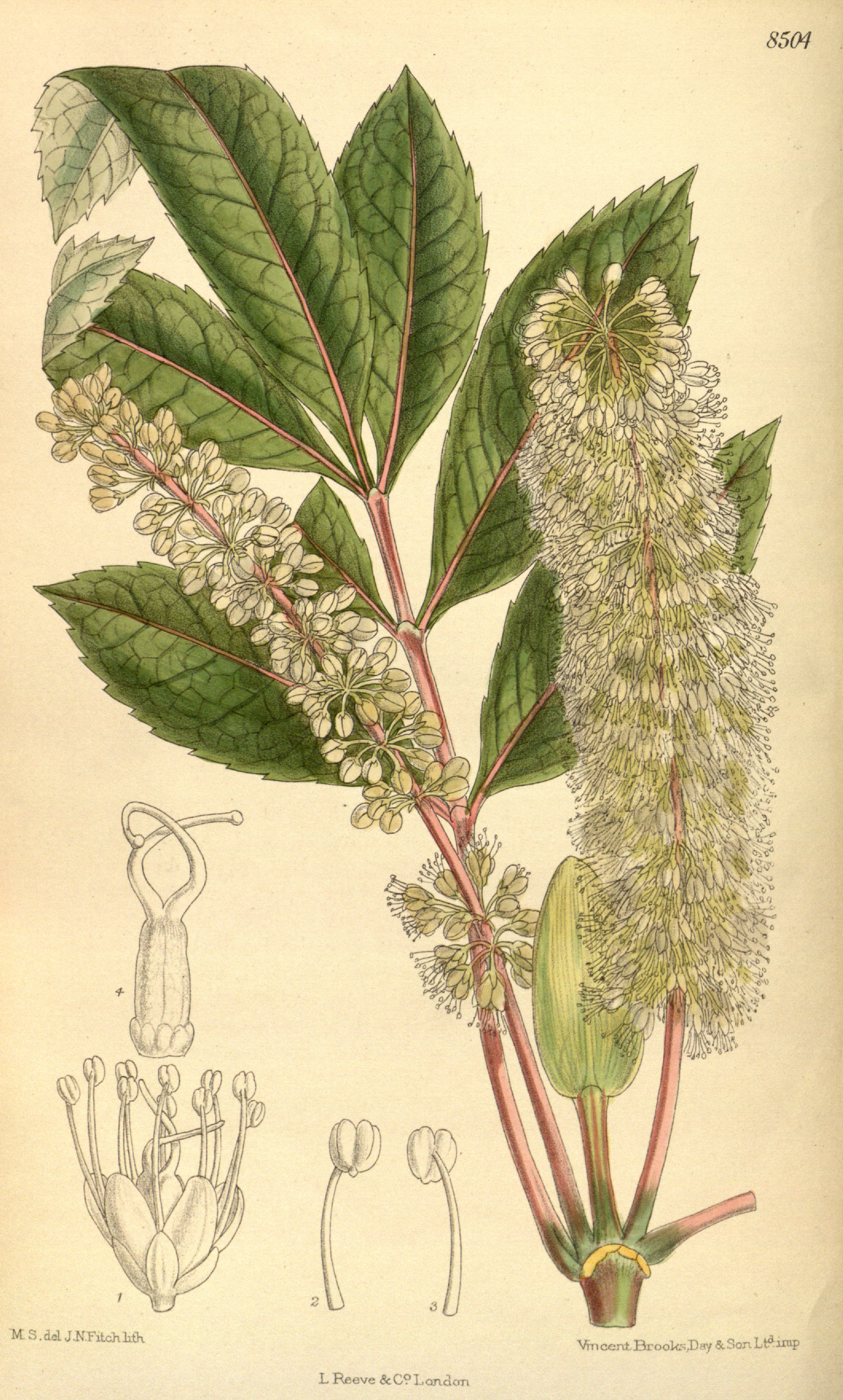
- Cunonia capensis

Scientific classification
- Kingdom: Plantae
- Clade: Tracheophytes
- Clade: Angiosperms
- Clade: Eudicots
- Clade: Rosids
- Order: Oxalidales
- Family: Cunoniaceae
- Genus: Cunonia; L.

Species
- Cunonia × alticola Cunonia aoupiniensis Cunonia atrorubens Cunonia austrocaledonica Cunonia balansae Cunonia bopopensis Cunonia bullata Cunonia capensis Cunonia cerifera Cunonia deplanchei Cunonia dickisonii Cunonia × koghicola Cunonia lenormandii Cunonia linearisepala Cunonia macrophylla Cunonia montana Cunonia pseudoverticillata Cunonia pterophylla Cunonia pulchella Cunonia purpurea Cunonia rotundifolia Cunonia rupicola Cunonia schinziana Cunonia varijuga Cunonia vieillardii

= Cunonia =

Genus of flowering plants

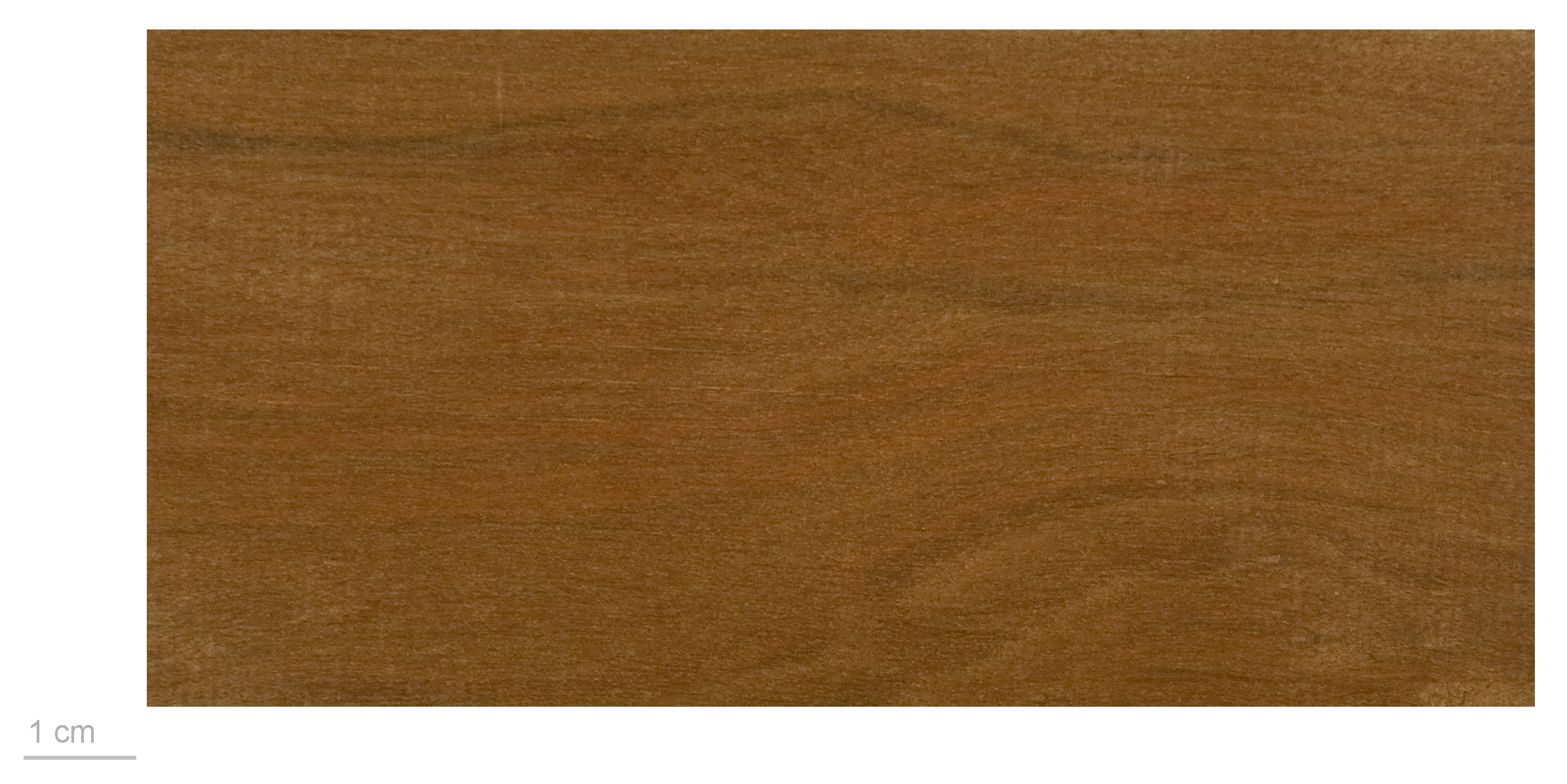
Cunonia austrocaledonica - MHNT

Cunonia is a genus of shrubs and trees in the family Cunoniaceae. The genus has a disjunct distribution, with 24 species endemic to New Caledonia in the Pacific, and one species (Cunonia capensis) in Southern Africa. Leaves are opposite, simple or pinnate with a margin entire to serrate. Interpetiolar stipules are often conspicuous and generally enclose buds to form a spoon-like shape (hence the common name "butterspoon tree" for Cunonia capensis). Flowers are bisexual, white, red (pink to purple), or green, arranged in racemes. The fruit is a capsule opening first around the base then vertically, seeds are winged.

== List of species ==
Southern Africa

- Cunonia capensis L.

New Caledonia

- Cunonia × alticola Guillaumin
- Cunonia aoupiniensis Hoogland
- Cunonia atrorubens Schltr.
- Cunonia austrocaledonica Brongn. ex Guillaumin
- Cunonia balansae Brongn. & Gris
- Cunonia bopopensis Pillon & H.C. Hopkins
- Cunonia bullata Brongn. & Gris
- Cunonia cerifera Hoogland
- Cunonia deplanchei Brongn. & Gris
- Cunonia dickisonii Pillon & H.C. Hopkins
- Cunonia × koghicola H.C. Hopkins, J. Bradford & Pillon
- Cunonia lenormandii Vieill. ex Brongn. & Gris
- Cunonia linearisepala (Guillaumin) Bernardi
- Cunonia macrophylla Brongn. & Gris
- Cunonia montana (Brongn. & Gris) Schltr.
- Cunonia pseudoverticillata Guillaumin
- Cunonia pterophylla (Brongn. & Gris) Schltr.
- Cunonia pulchella Brongn. & Gris
- Cunonia purpurea Brongn. & Gris
- Cunonia rotundifolia Däniker
- Cunonia rupicola Hoogland
- Cunonia schinziana Däniker
- Cunonia varijuga Hoogland
- Cunonia vieillardii Brongn. & Gris
