= 3,4,5-Tri-O-galloylquinic acid =

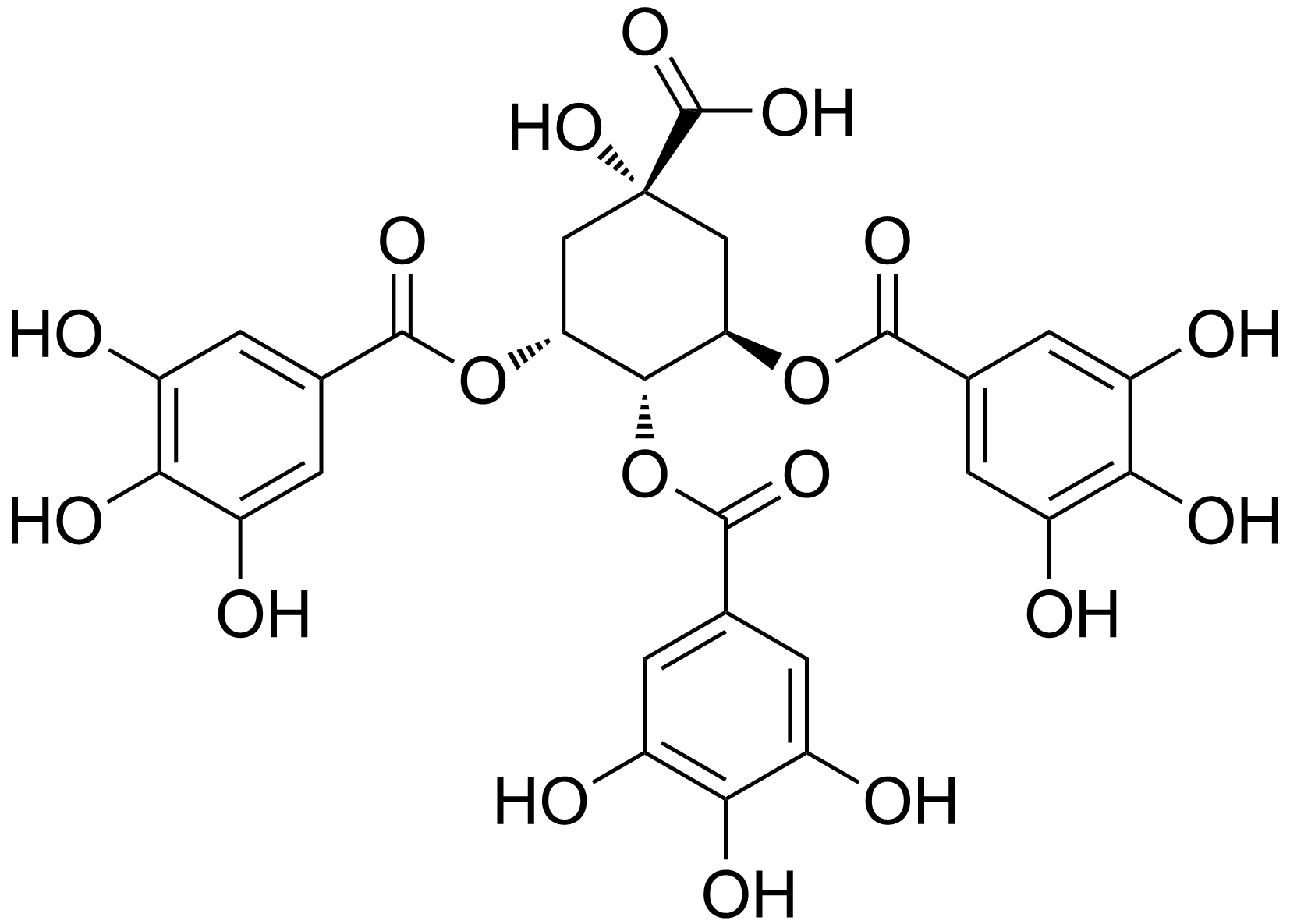
- Chemical structure of 3,4,5-tri-O-galloylquinic acid

Names
- Preferred IUPAC name (1S,3R,4S,5R)-1-Hydroxy-3,4,5-tris[(3,4,5-trihydroxybenzoyl)oxy]cyclohexane-1-carboxylic acid
- Other names TGQA (3R,5R)-1-Hydroxy-3,4,5-tris(3,4,5-trihydroxyphenylcarbonyloxy)cyclohexanecarboxylic acid

Identifiers
CAS Number	99745-62-7
3D model (JSmol)	Interactive image; Interactive image
ChEMBL	ChEMBL310527
ChemSpider	23171208
PubChem CID	127406
CompTox Dashboard (EPA)	DTXSID40912512
- InChI: InChI=1S/C28H24O18/c29-12-1-9(2-13(30)20(12)35)24(38)44-18-7-28(43,27(41)42)8-19(45-25(39)10-3-14(31)21(36)15(32)4-10)23(18)46-26(40)11-5-16(33)22(37)17(34)6-11/h1-6,18-19,23,29-37,43H,7-8H2,(H,41,42)/t18-,19-,23-,28+/m1/s1 Key: PEOHIPMSHPWYAQ-LGFATHPOSA-N; InChI=1S/C28H24O18/c29-12-1-9(2-13(30)20(12)35)24(38)44-18-7-28(43,27(41)42)8-19(45-25(39)10-3-14(31)21(36)15(32)4-10)23(18)46-26(40)11-5-16(33)22(37)17(34)6-11/h1-6,18-19,23,29-37,43H,7-8H2,(H,41,42)/t18-,19-,23-,28+/m1/s1 Key: PEOHIPMSHPWYAQ-LGFATHPOBS; Key: PEOHIPMSHPWYAQ-LGFATHPOSA-N
- SMILES: O[C@]1(C(O)=O)C[C@@H](OC(C2=CC(O)=C(O)C(O)=C2)=O)[C@H](OC(C3=CC(O)=C(O)C(O)=C3)=O)[C@H](OC(C4=CC(O)=C(O)C(O)=C4)=O)C1; c1c(c(c(cc1C(=O)O[C@H]2[C@@H]([C@@H](C[C@@](C2)(O)C(=O)O)OC(=O)c3cc(c(c(c3)O)O)O)OC(=O)c4cc(c(c(c4)O)O)O)O)O)O

Properties
Chemical formula	C_{28}H_{24}O_{18}
Molar mass	648.482 g·mol^{−1}
Density	1.98g/cm^{3}
Boiling point	1,114.4 °C (2,037.9 °F; 1,387.6 K) at 760mmHg

Hazards
Flash point	364.6 °C (688.3 °F; 637.8 K)
- Except where otherwise noted, data are given for materials in their standard state (at 25 °C [77 °F], 100 kPa). verify (what is ?) Infobox references

3,4,5-Tri-O-galloylquinic acid is a hydrolysable tannin found in Lepidobotrys staudtii, in Guiera senegalensis or in the resurrection plant (Myrothamnus flabellifolius).

It is classified as a natural product with anti-HIV activity and a DNA polymerase inhibitor.
