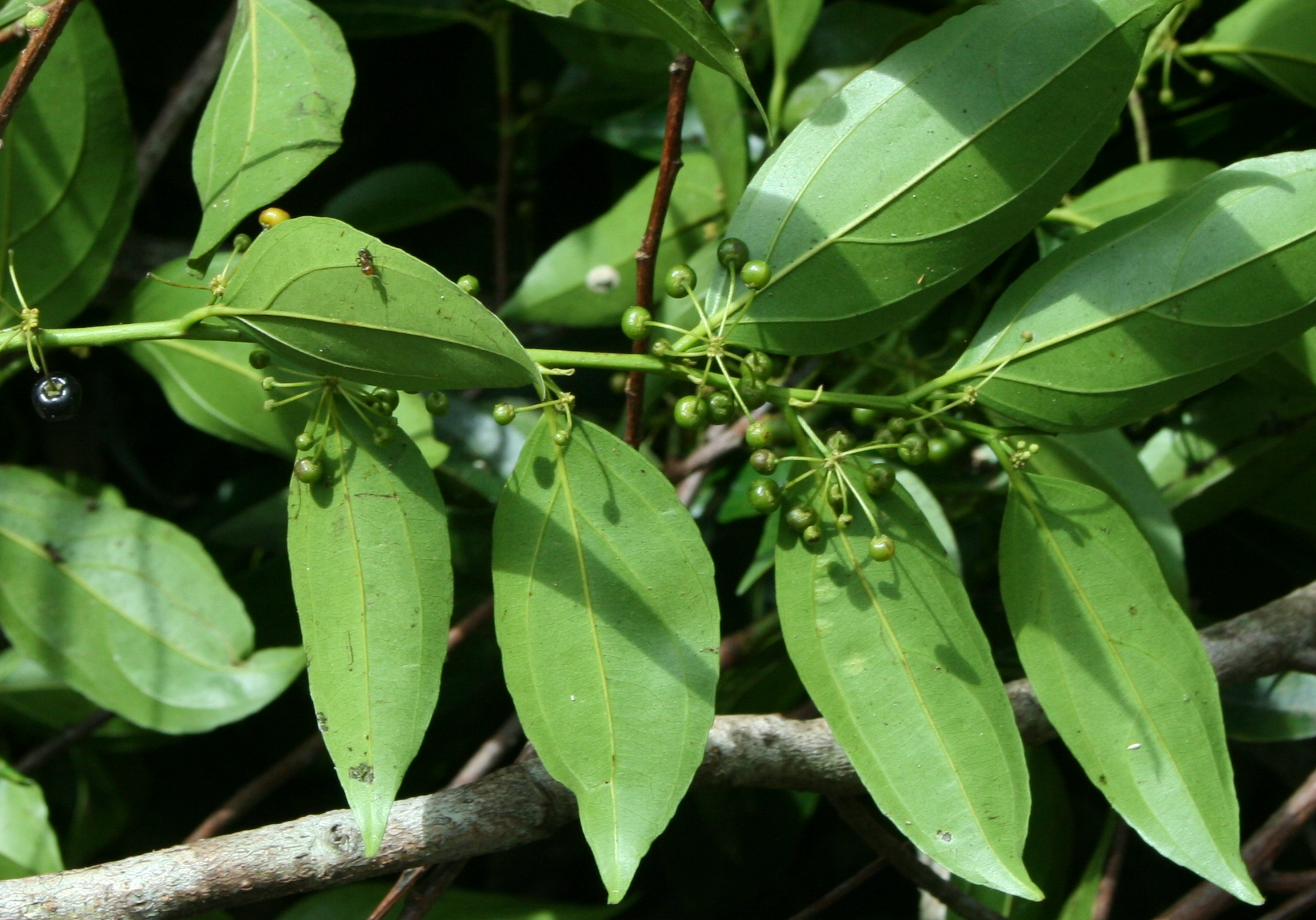
- Goupia glabra

Scientific classification
- Kingdom: Plantae
- Clade: Tracheophytes
- Clade: Angiosperms
- Clade: Eudicots
- Clade: Rosids
- Order: Malpighiales
- Family: Goupiaceae; Miers
- Genus: Goupia; Aubl.

Species
- See text

= Goupia =

Genus of flowering plants

Goupia is a neotropical genus of flowering plants and the sole genus included in the family Goupiaceae. There are three species, all found in tropical northern South America.

== Species ==
- Goupia cinerascens
- Goupia glabra (syn. G. paraensis, G. tomentosa)
- Goupia guatemalensis

The genus was previously included in the family Celastraceae, in the order Celastrales.
