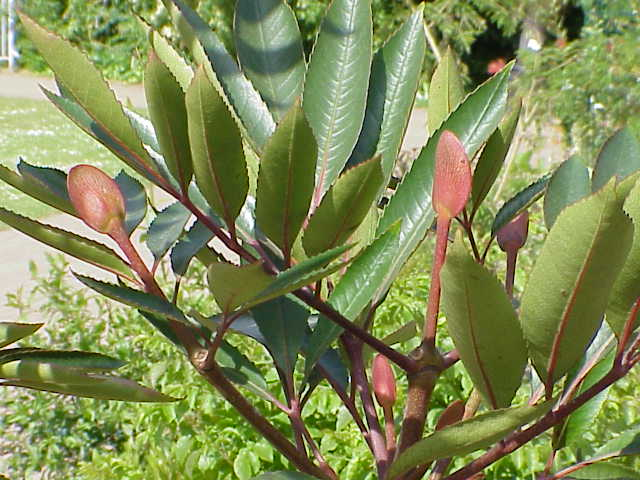
- Its distinctive spoon-shaped stipules give the tree its common name

Conservation status
- Least Concern (IUCN 3.1)

Scientific classification
- Kingdom: Plantae
- Clade: Tracheophytes
- Clade: Angiosperms
- Clade: Eudicots
- Clade: Rosids
- Order: Oxalidales
- Family: Cunoniaceae
- Genus: Cunonia
- Species: C. capensis

Binomial name
- Cunonia capensis L.

Synonyms
- Oosterdyckia capensis (L.) Crantz

= Cunonia capensis =

Butterspoon tree

Species of tree

Cunonia capensis, the butterspoon tree, butterknife tree, African red alder, red alder or rooiels, is a small tree found in the afromontane forests of southern Africa, and along rivers. It is grown as an ornamental in gardens for its attractive glossy foliage and its clusters of tiny, scented, white flowers. It is the only one of 24 species of Cunonia to occur outside of New Caledonia in the Pacific.

== Appearance ==
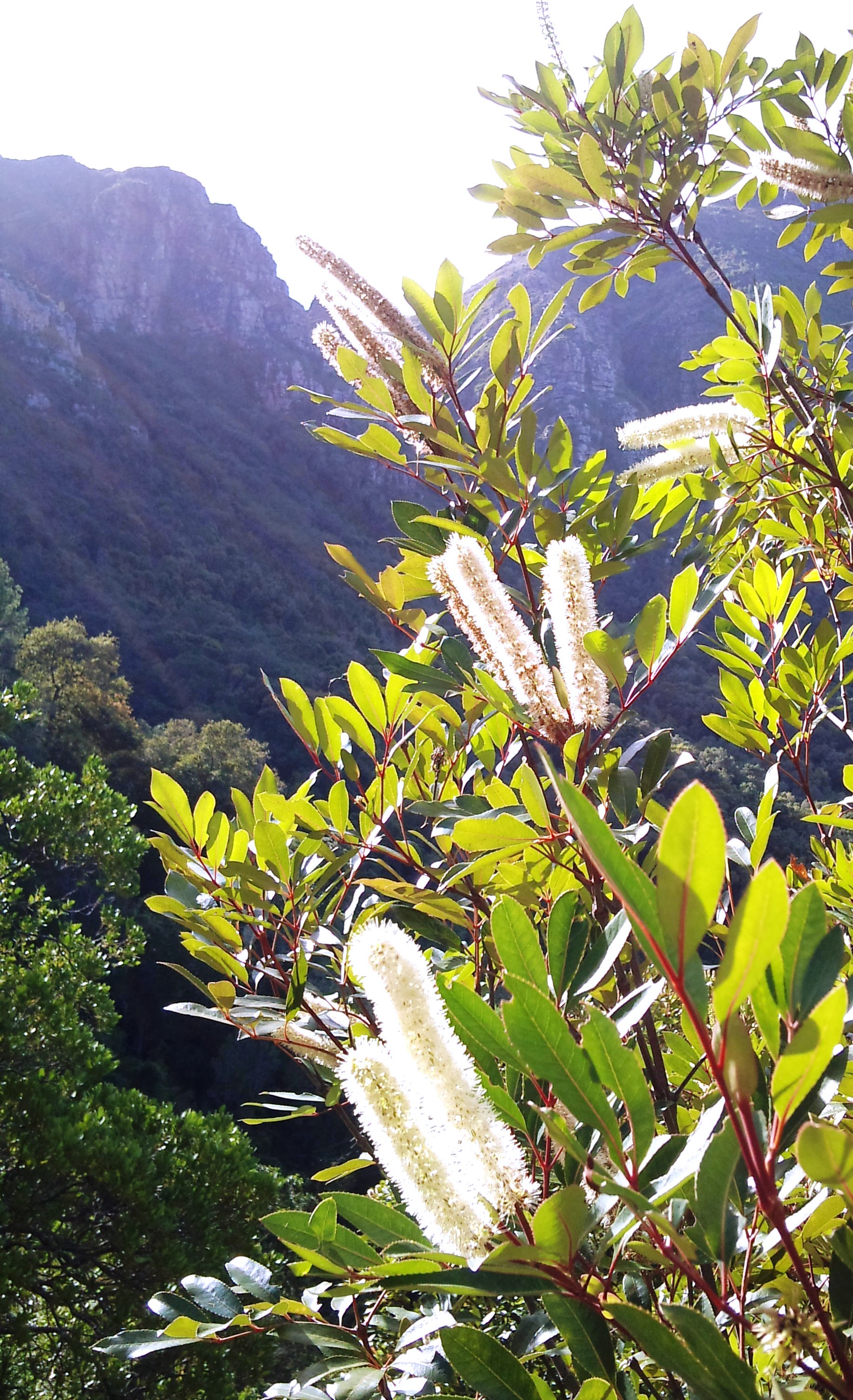
The cream-coloured sprays of flowers

Cunonia capensis is a beautiful specimen tree, especially for southern African gardens. Its foliage is glossy, with tints of red, and it produces sprays of dense, fragrant, cream-coloured flowers from February to May (late austral summer to autumn). The flowers are bisexual and attract butterflies and honey bees. The fine seeds appear in tiny two-horned capsules, and are dispersed by birds and by wind.

The large stipules which enclose the growth tip are pressed together in a spoon-like structure, giving the tree one of its common names, the butterspoon tree.

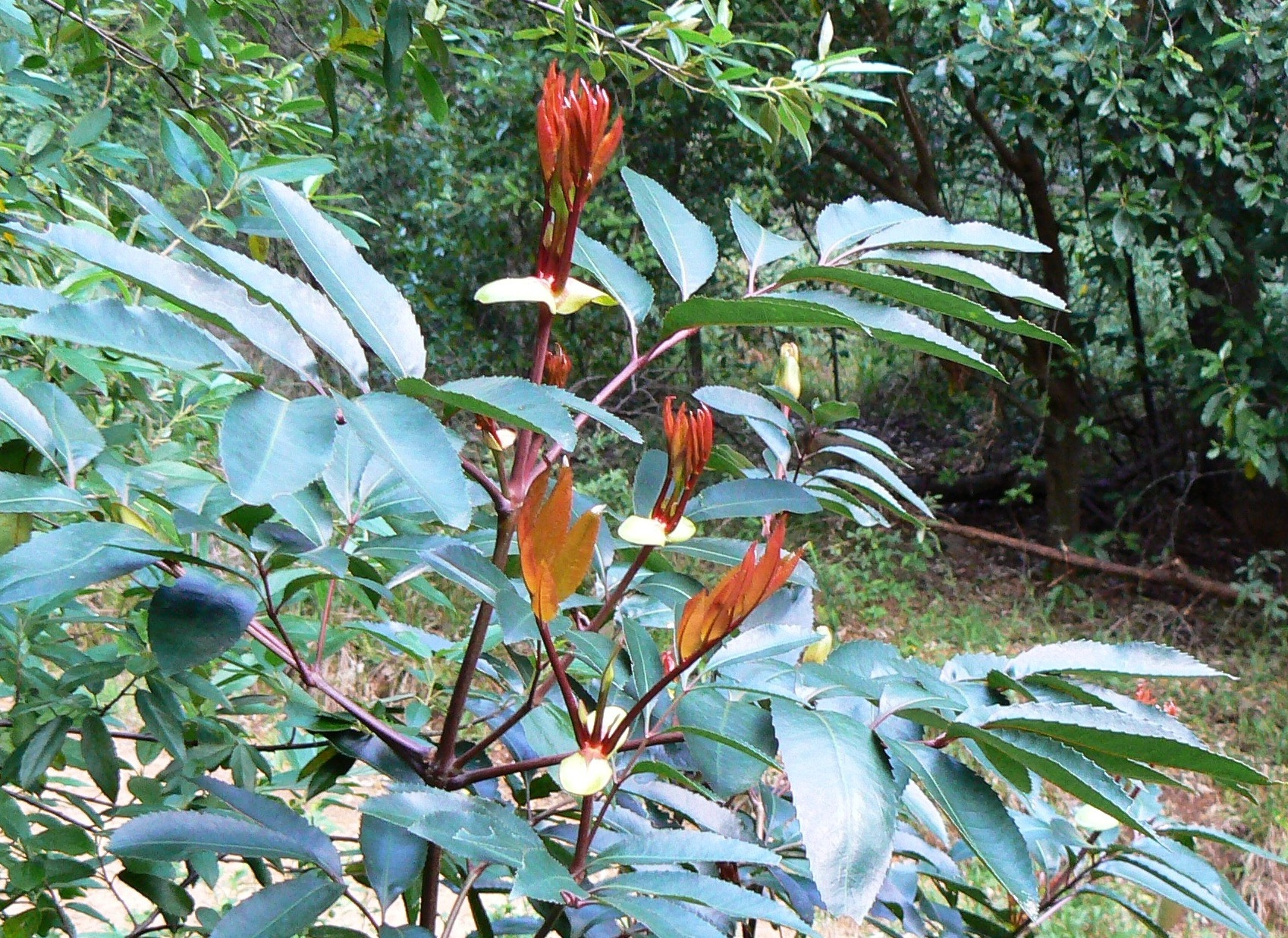
Detail of the glossy, red-tinted leaves

This evergreen garden tree does not grow well in arid conditions, as it prefers a slightly more temperate climate, and requires a great deal of water in its first few years. It tolerates some frost and it is very fast-growing - provided it has sufficient water. In the open sun it typically reaches about 5 meters, but in forests it can reach a height of up to 10 meters.

== Distribution ==
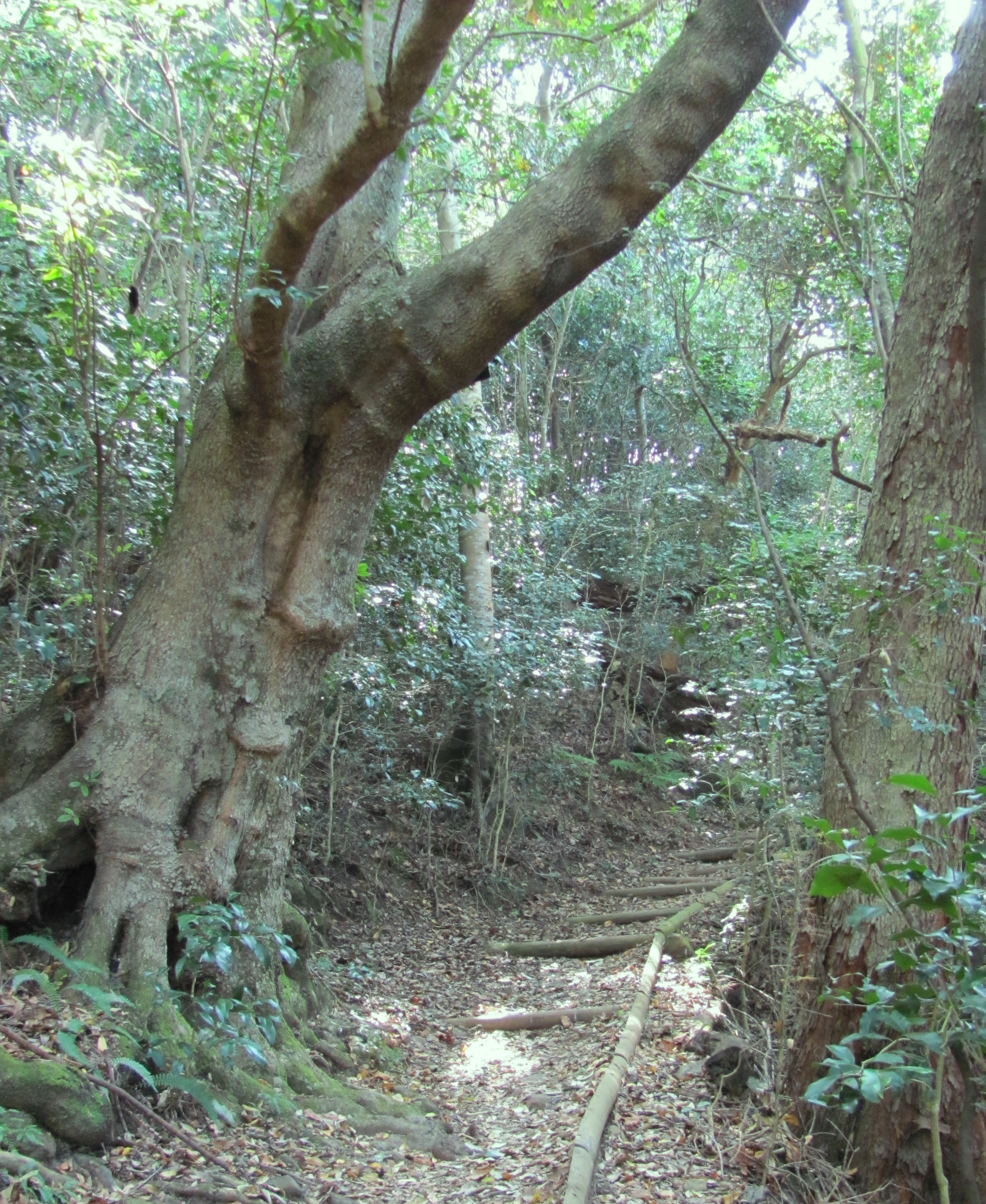
A giant specimen growing beside a forest path on Table Mountain

Cunonia capensis naturally ranges from Cape Town and the Western Cape of South Africa, eastwards all the way to Eswatini and southern Mozambique. It typically grows in the indigenous Afromontane forests of southern Africa, and especially beside rivers. In its natural range it greatly favours moist spots or areas with high rainfall.

The genus Cunonia has a disjunct natural distribution, with 24 species occurring only on the island of New Caledonia in the Pacific, and a single species (Cunonia capensis) in southern Africa.

== Cultivation ==
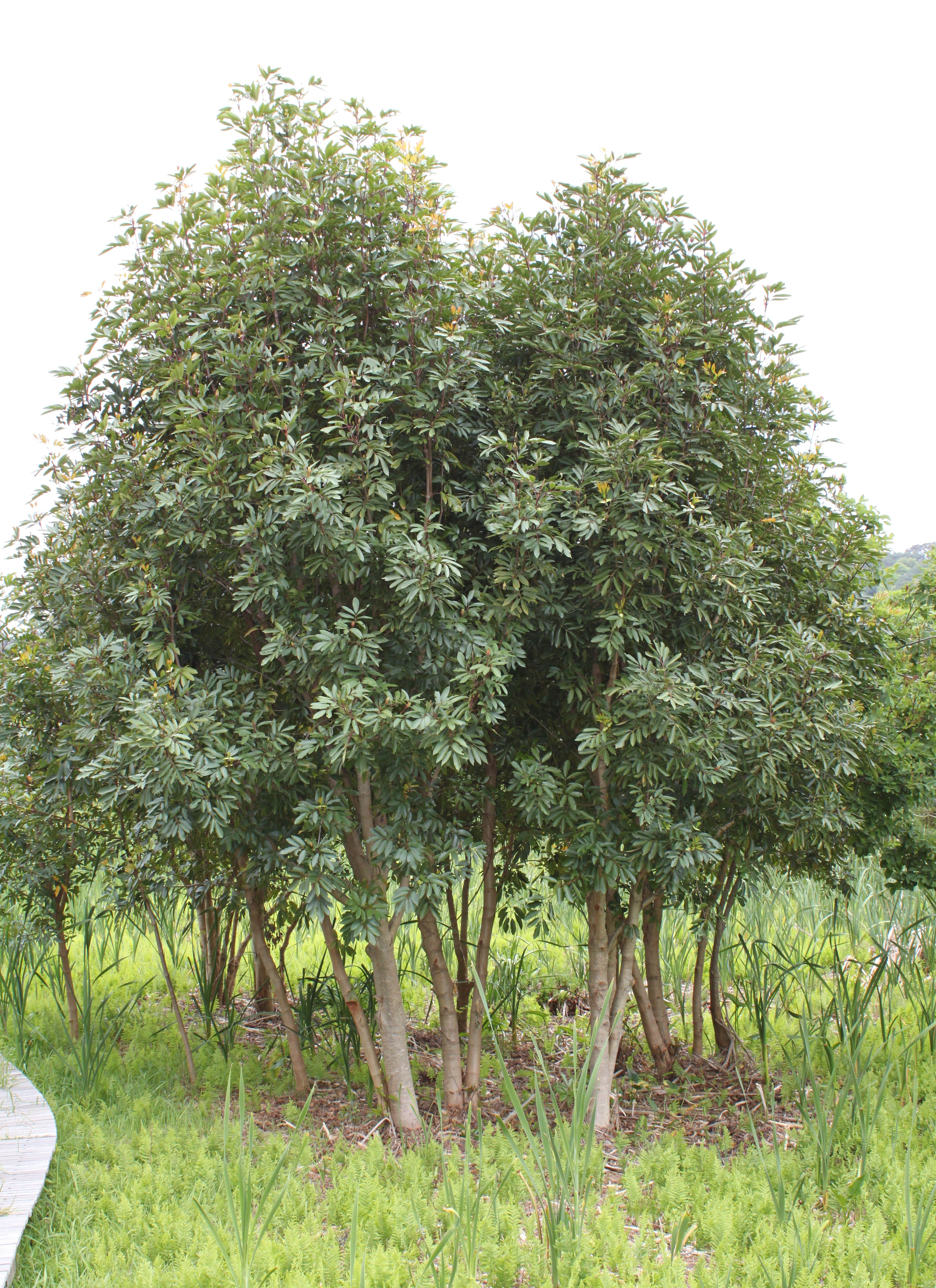
Small Cunonia capensis trees in cultivation in a botanical garden

Cunonia capensis is increasingly cultivated across southern Africa as an ornamental specimen tree. It is cultivated for its glossy foliage which is tinted with red, and its sprays of cream flowers. It grows well in full sun as well as in shade, and it can be planted near buildings because it has a gentle, non-invasive root-system. This has recently made it popular in built-up areas. It requires a moist environment though, as trees planted in arid areas would require frequent watering, especially while still small. This has however also made it a very suitable tree for marshy, water-logged gardens, or the banks of rivers. The tree is usually cultivated from its tiny seeds, and the young plants need ample water and some shelter from direct sunlight. It is one of the fastest growing trees in southern Africa.
