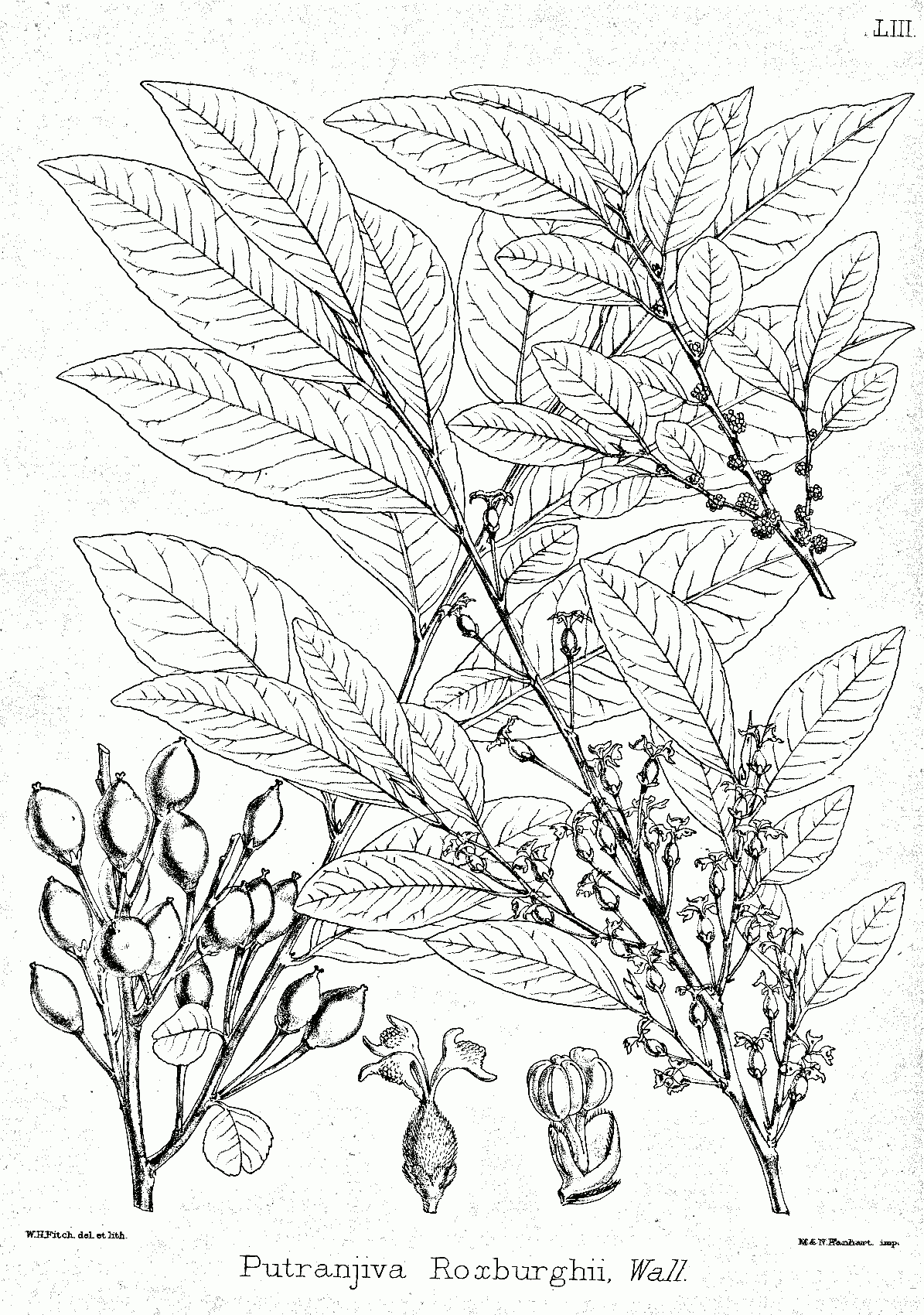
- Putranjiva roxburghii

Scientific classification
- Kingdom: Plantae
- Clade: Tracheophytes
- Clade: Angiosperms
- Clade: Eudicots
- Clade: Rosids
- Order: Malpighiales
- Family: Putranjivaceae
- Genus: Putranjiva; Wall.

Synonyms
- Nageia Roxb. 1832 not Gaertn. 1788; Palenga Thwaites; Liodendron H.Keng

= Putranjiva =

Genus of flowering plants

Putranjiva is a plant genus of the family Putranjivaceae, first described as a genus in 1826. It is native to Southeast Asia, the Indian subcontinent, Japan, southern China, and New Guinea.

Along with Drypetes (of the same family), it contains mustard oils as a chemical defense against herbivores. The ability to produce glucosinolates is believed to have evolved only twice, in the Putranjivaceae and the Brassicales.

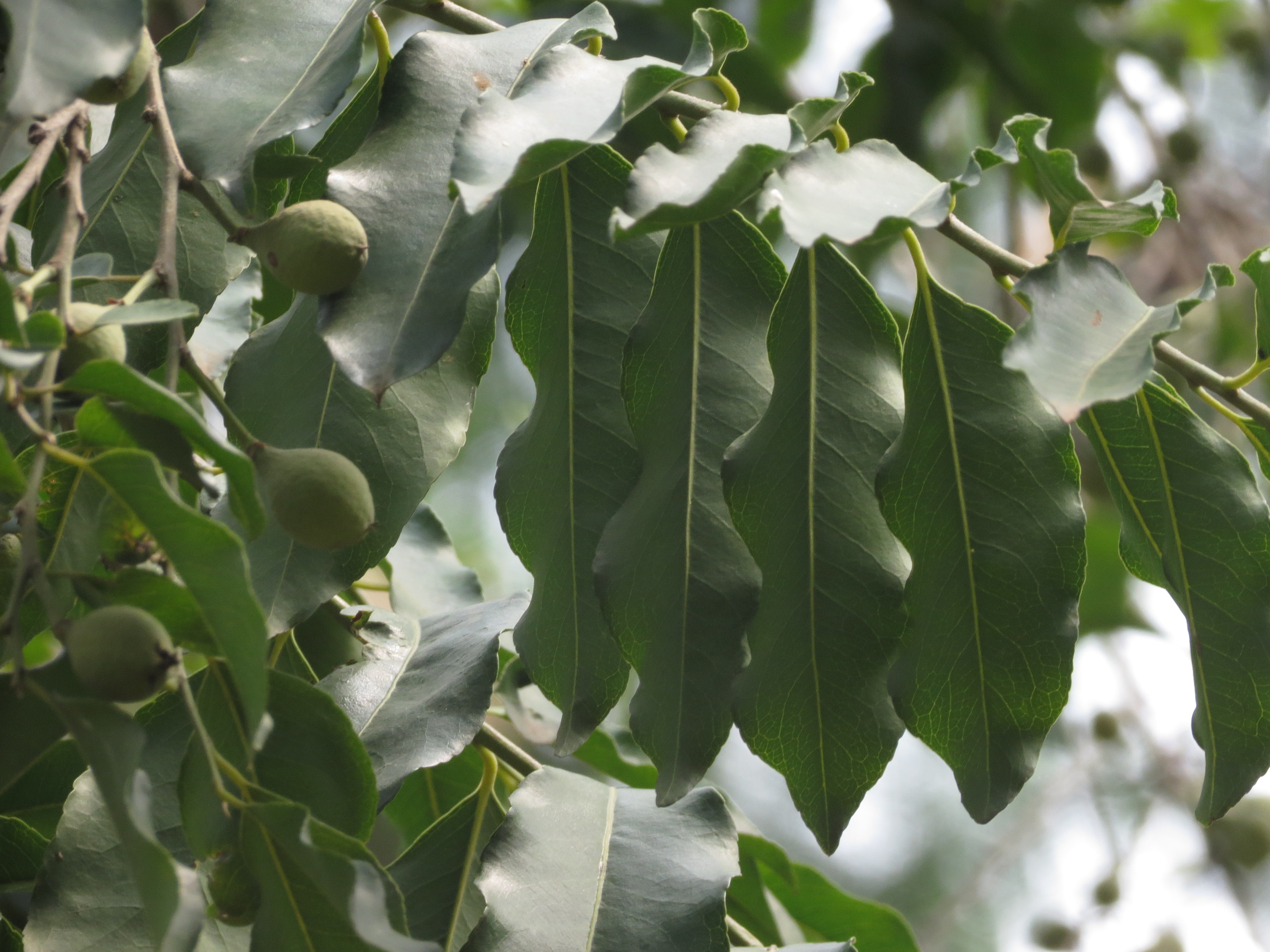
Putranjiva roxburghii seen in Hebbal Lake Gardens, Bangalore

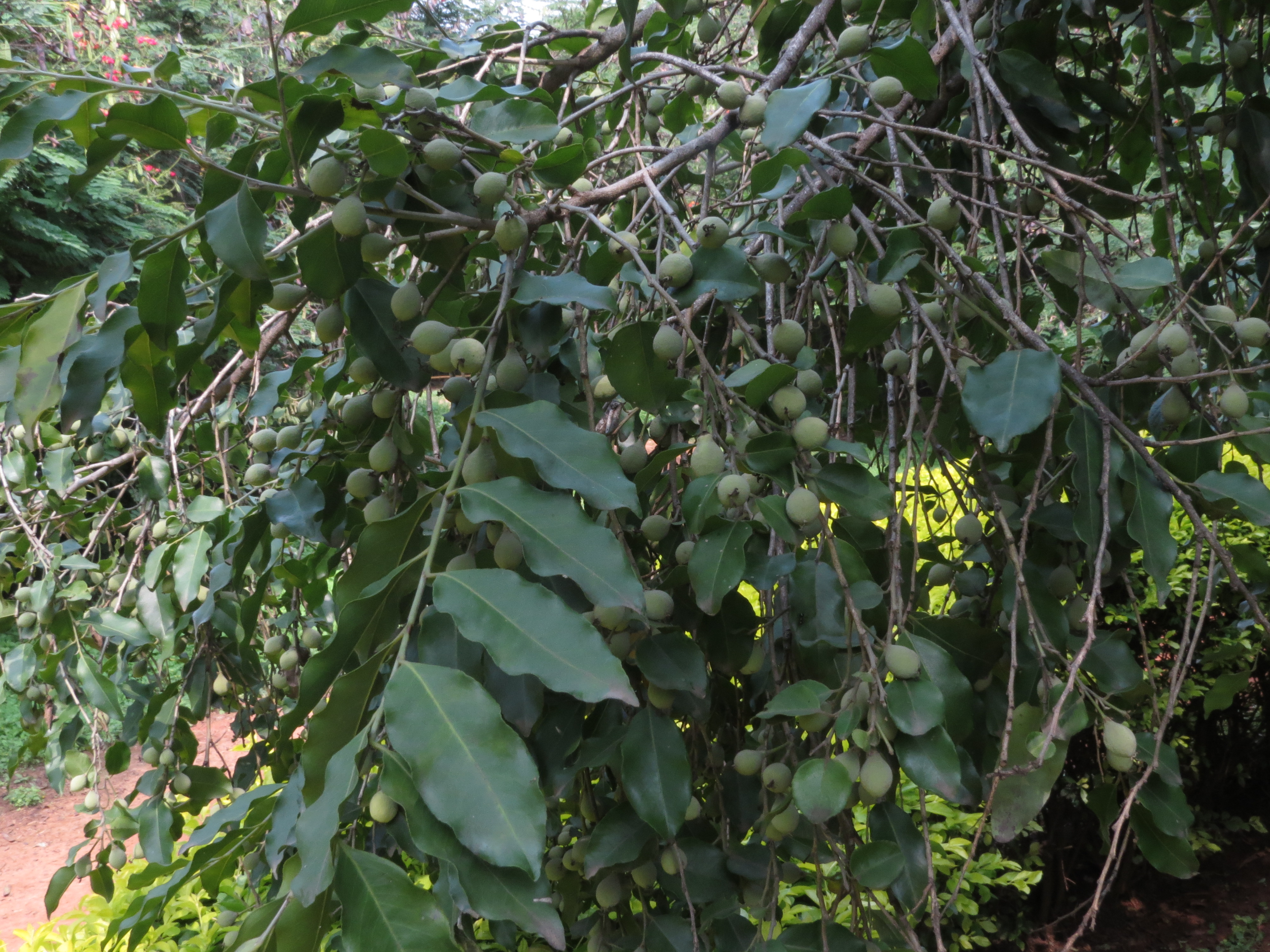
Putranjiva roxburghii seen in Hebbal Lake Gardens, Bangalore

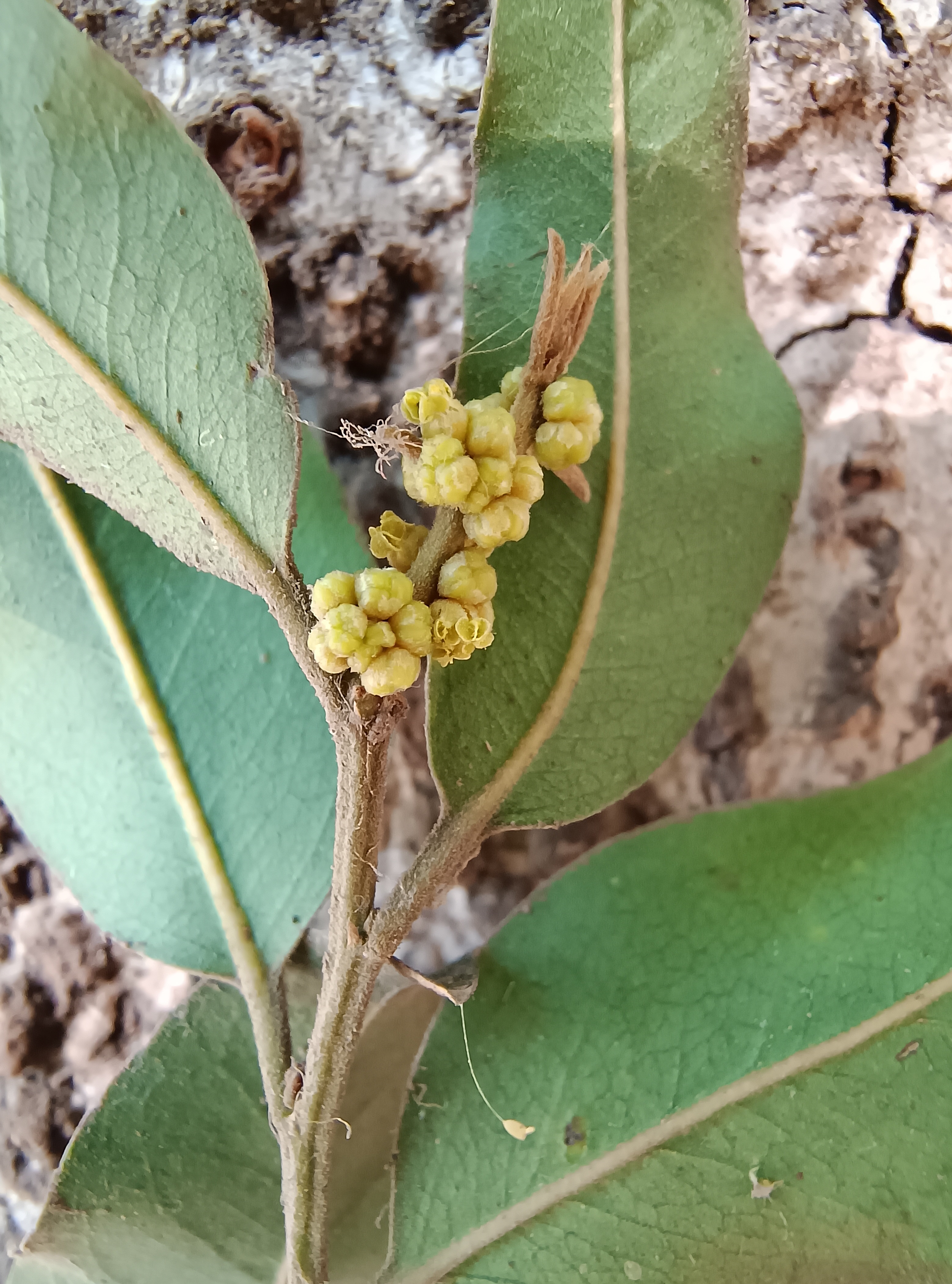
Male inflorescence of Putranjiva roxburghii

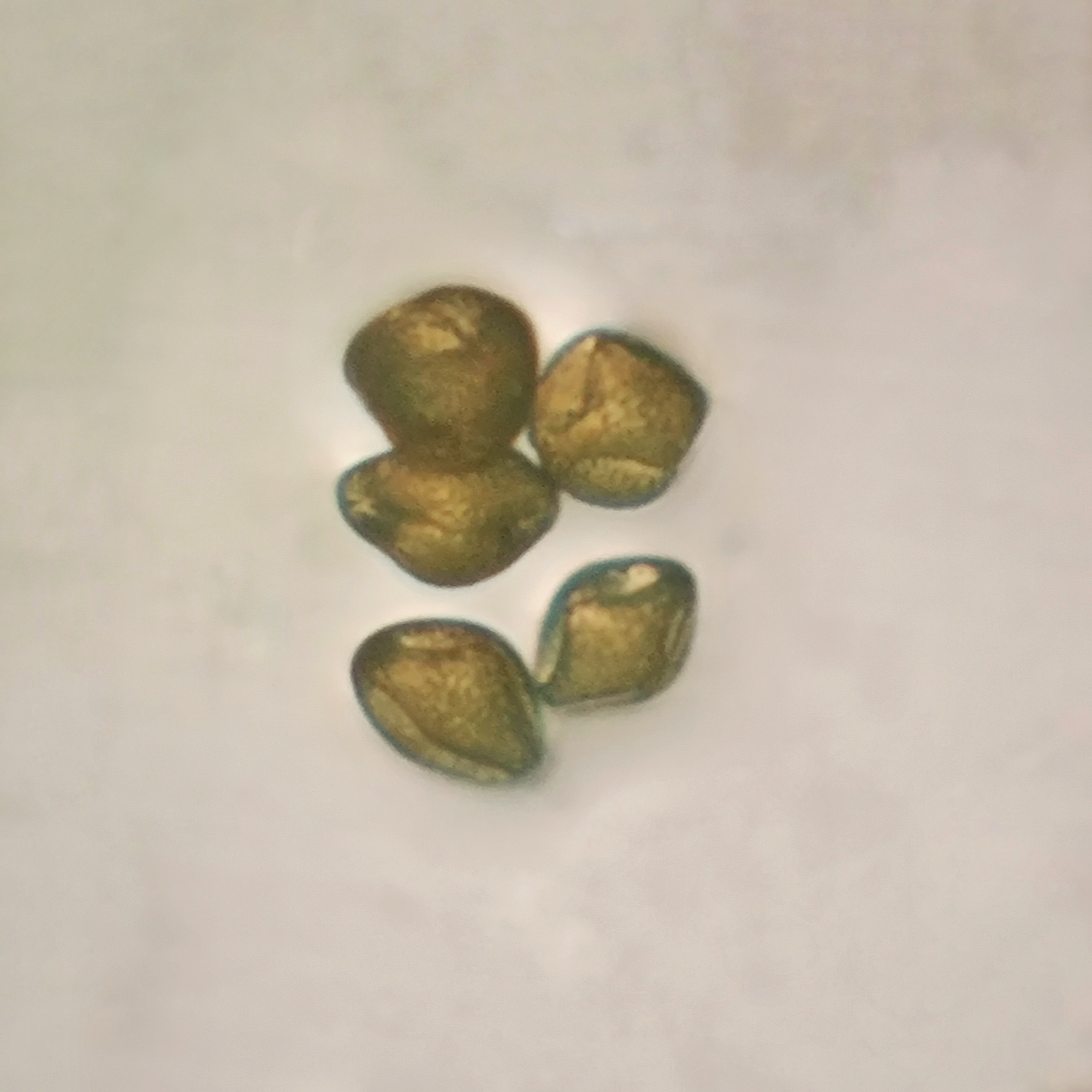
Pollen grains of Putranjiva roxburghii

Species

1. Putranjiva formosana Kaneh. & Sasaki ex Shimada - Guangdong, Taiwan
2. Putranjiva matsumurae Koidz. - Honsu + Ryukyu Islands in Japan
3. Putranjiva roxburghii Wall. - Indian Subcontinent (India, Pakistan, Bangladesh, Nepal, Sri Lanka), Indochina, Malaysia, Indonesia, New Guinea
4. Putranjiva zeylanica (Thwaites) Müll.Arg. - Sri Lanka
