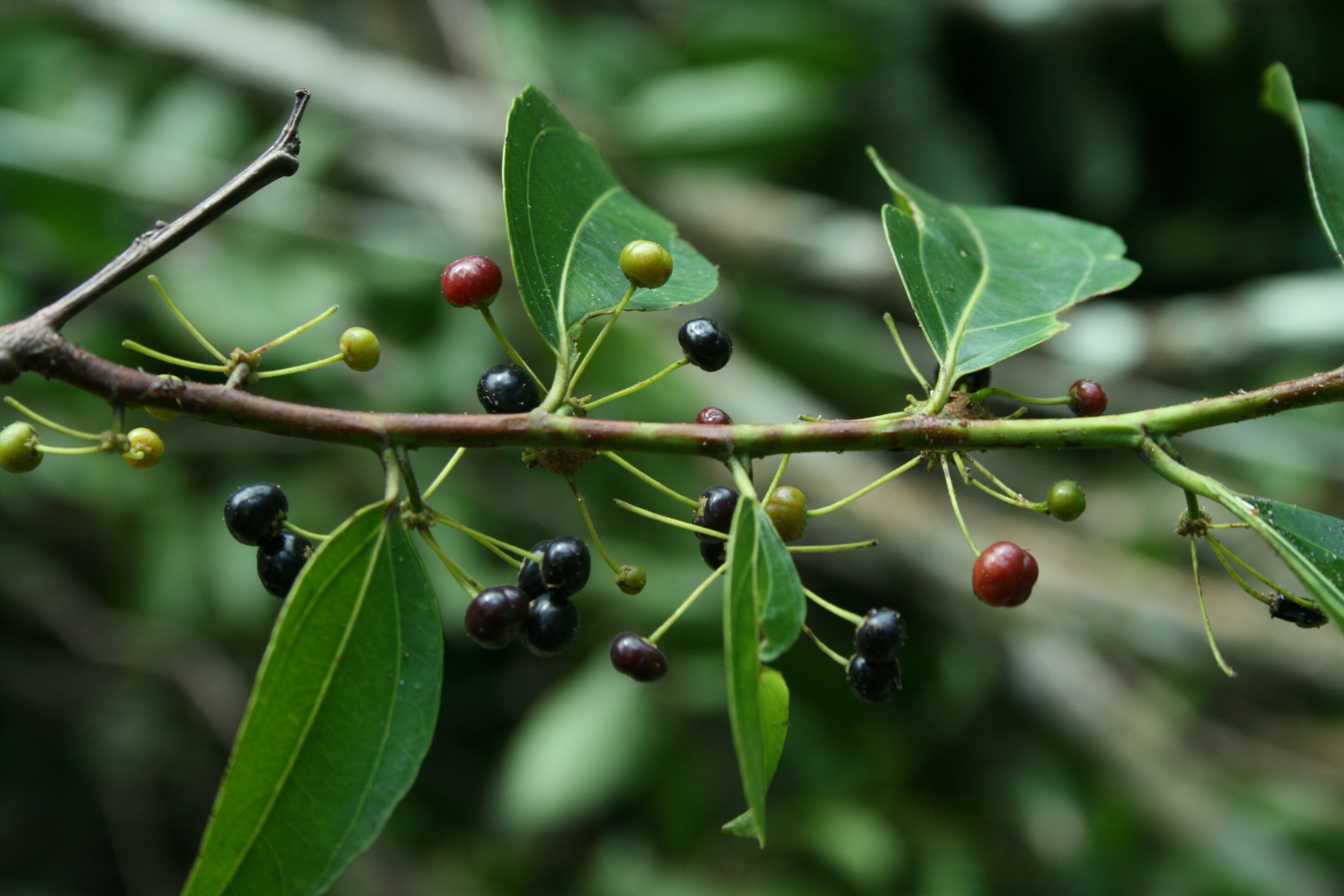

Scientific classification
- Kingdom: Plantae
- Clade: Embryophytes
- Clade: Tracheophytes
- Clade: Spermatophytes
- Clade: Angiosperms
- Clade: Eudicots
- Clade: Rosids
- Order: Malpighiales
- Family: Goupiaceae
- Genus: Goupia
- Species: G. glabra

Binomial name
- Goupia glabra Aubl.

= Goupia glabra =

Species of flowering plant

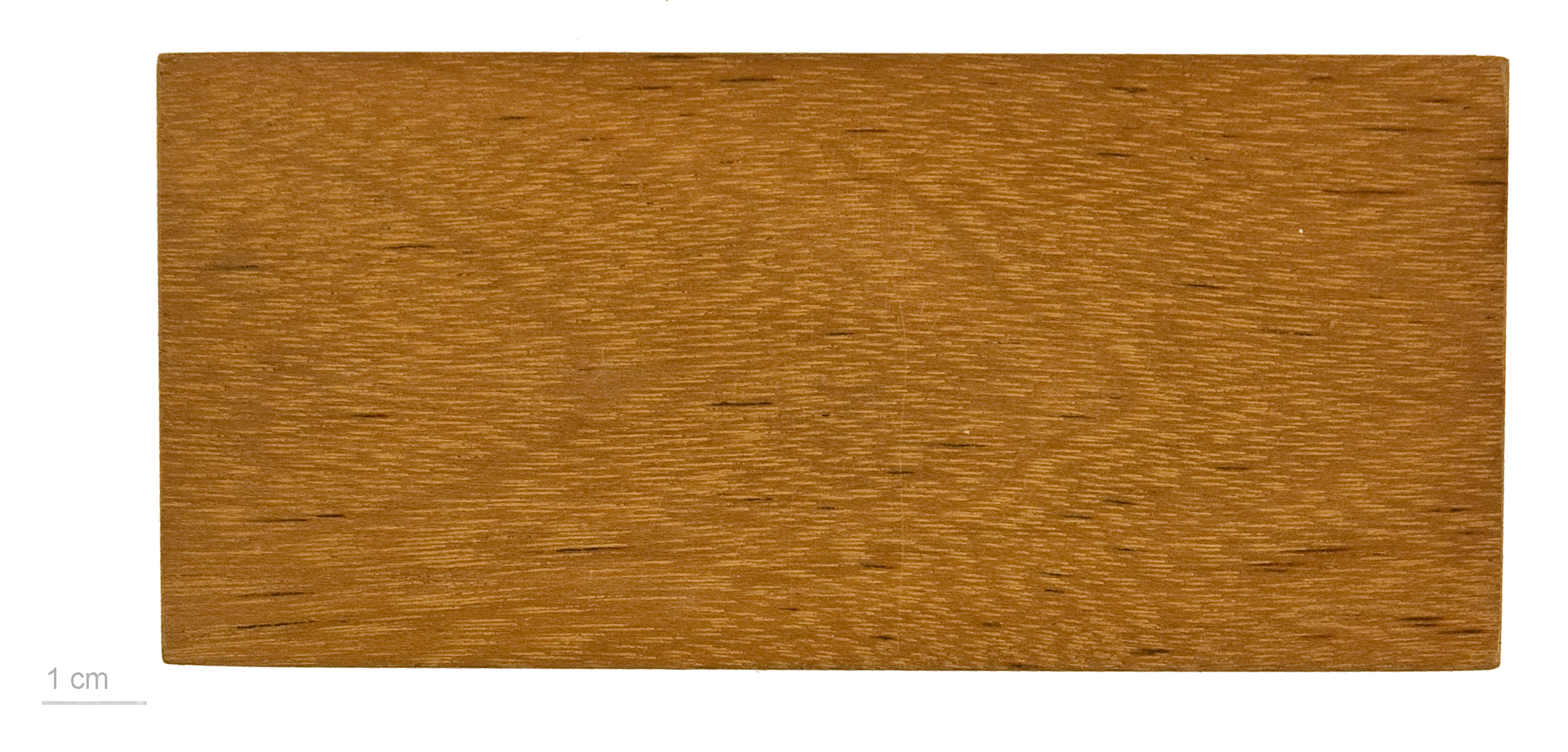
Goupia glabra - MHNT

Goupia glabra (goupie or kabukalli; syn. G. paraensis, G. tomentosa) is a species of flowering plant in the family Goupiaceae (formerly treated in the family Celastraceae). It is native to tropical South America, in northern Brazil, Colombia, French Guiana, Guyana, Suriname, and Venezuela.

Other names include Saino, Sapino (Colombia), Kopi (Surinam), Kabukalli (Guyana), Goupi, bois-caca (French Guiana), Pasisi (Wayampi language), Pasis (Palikur language), Kopi (Businenge language), Cupiuba (Brazil), yãpi mamo hi (Yanomami language), Venezuela.

== Description ==
It is a large, fast-growing tree growing up to 50 m tall with a trunk up to 1.3 m diameter, often buttressed at the base up to 2 m diameter, with rough, silvery-grey to reddish-grey bark. It is usually evergreen, but can be deciduous in the dry season. The leaves are alternate, broad lanceolate, with an entire margin and a petiole with a complex vascular system. The flowers are small, yellow-green, with five sepals and petals; they are produced in clusters, and are wind-pollinated. The fruit is an orange-red berry-like drupe 5 mm diameter, containing 5–10 seeds; it is eaten by various birds (including cotingas, pigeons, tanagers, thrushes, and trogons), which disperse the seeds in their droppings.
