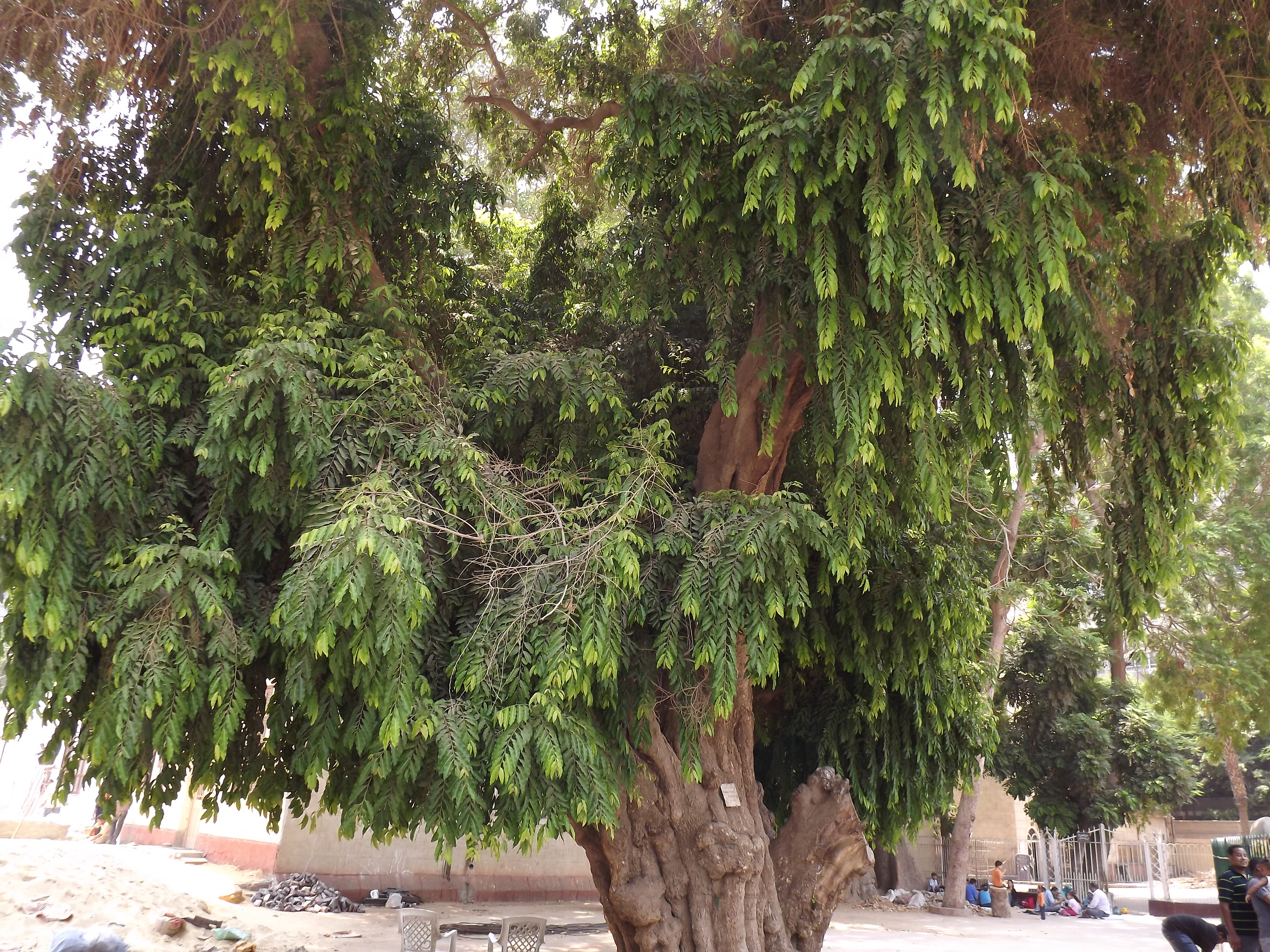
- At Giza Zoo
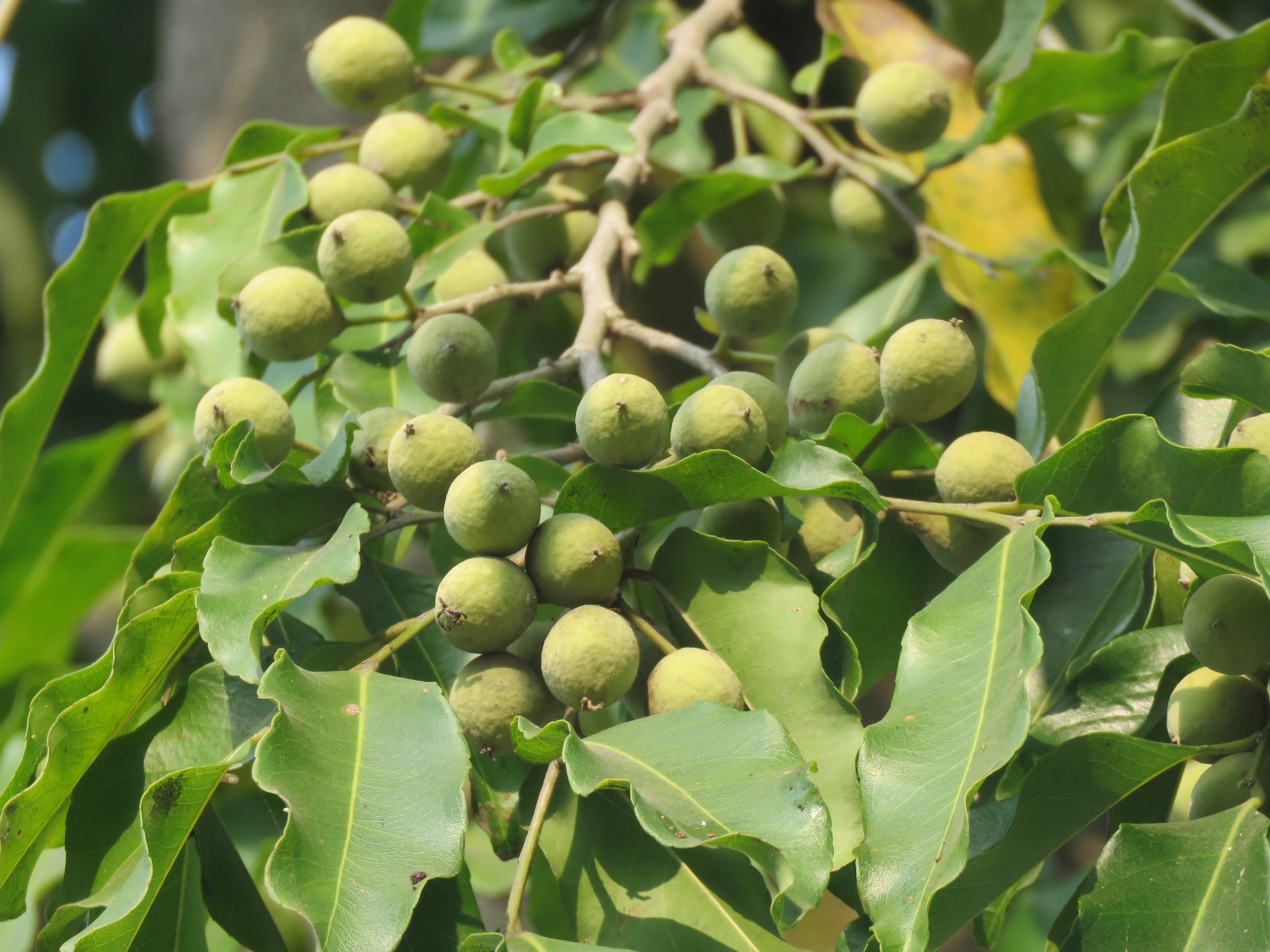
- Fruit

Conservation status
- Least Concern (IUCN 3.1)

Scientific classification
- Kingdom: Plantae
- Clade: Embryophytes
- Clade: Tracheophytes
- Clade: Angiosperms
- Clade: Eudicots
- Clade: Rosids
- Order: Malpighiales
- Family: Putranjivaceae
- Genus: Putranjiva
- Species: P. roxburghii

Binomial name
- Putranjiva roxburghii Wall.

Synonyms
- List: Cyclostemon racemosus Zipp. ex Span.; Cyclostemon teysmannii var. timorensis (Blume) Müll.Arg.; Drypetes roxburghii (Wall.) Hurus.; Drypetes roxburghii var. timorensis (Blume) Airy Shaw; Drypetes timorensis (Blume) Pax & K.Hoffm.; Nageia putranjiva Roxb. ex Lindl.; Putranjiva amblyocarpa Müll.Arg.; Putranjiva sphaerocarpa Müll.Arg.; Pycnosandra timorensis Blume

= Putranjiva roxburghii =

Species of plant

Putranjiva roxburghii, the lucky bean tree or child life tree, is a widespread species of flowering plant in the family Putranjivaceae. It is native to the Indian Subcontinent, Southeast Asia, Malesia, and New Guinea, and it has been introduced to southeastern China. An evergreen tree reaching 12 m (39 ft), it is found in the seasonally dry tropics in a variety of habitats, including wetlands, alongside rivers, shaded valleys, evergreen forests, and even in drier areas. It has been assessed as Least Concern.

== Uses ==
It has found use as an ornamental and street tree and can be pruned into a fine hedging plant. A fuel oil can be obtained from the seeds. Hindu women worship it when hoping to bear a child. Necklaces made from the seeds are placed on children to ward off evil spirits and grant them long and prosperous lives. The grey wood can be used to make implements such as tool handles.
