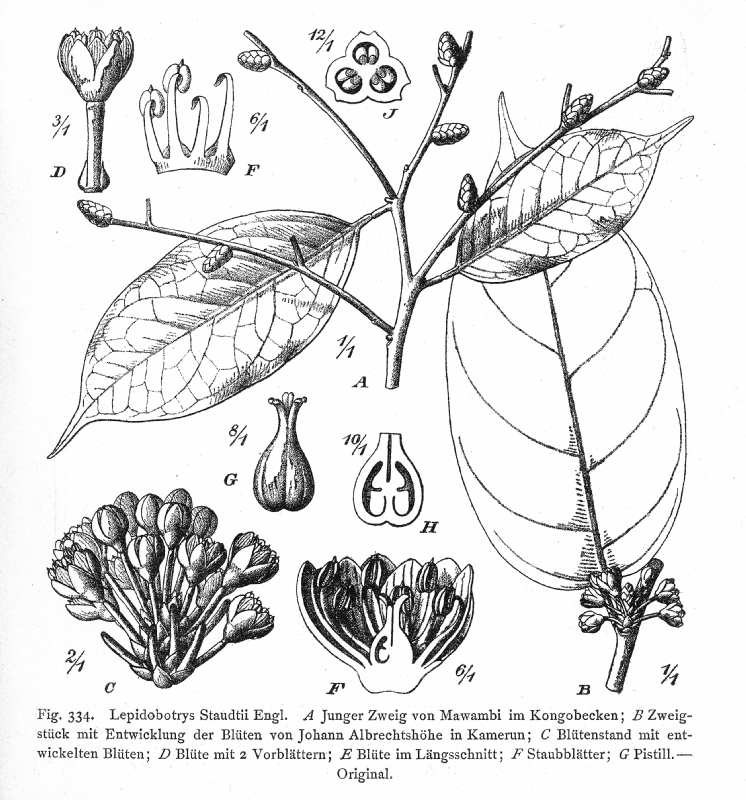
- Lepidobotrys staudtii, from Vegetation der Erde (1915)

Conservation status
- Least Concern (IUCN 3.1)

Scientific classification
- Kingdom: Plantae
- Clade: Embryophytes
- Clade: Tracheophytes
- Clade: Spermatophytes
- Clade: Angiosperms
- Clade: Eudicots
- Clade: Rosids
- Order: Celastrales
- Family: Lepidobotryaceae
- Genus: Lepidobotrys; Engl.
- Species: L. staudtii

Binomial name
- Lepidobotrys staudtii Engl.

= Lepidobotrys =

Genus of flowering plants

Lepidobotrys is a flowering plant genus in the family Lepidobotryaceae. It contains only one species, Lepidobotrys staudtii. L. staudtii is a small African tree, ranging from Cameroon eastward to Ethiopia.

The tannin 3,4,5-tri-O-galloylquinic acid is found in L. staudtii.

== Taxonomic history ==
Lepidobotrys staudtii was named and described by Adolf Engler in 1902 and placed by him in the family Linaceae. It was regarded as somewhat of an anomaly and during the 20th century, was assigned to various families by different authors. Hans G. Hallier and Reinhard Knuth put it in Oxalidaceae. In 1950, Jean Leonard became the first to put it in a family by itself, which he thought to be close to Linaceae. Arthur Cronquist, agreeing with Hallier and Knuth, put it in Oxalidaceae. Adding to the confusion was the lack of any strong basis for placing these and related families into orders.

== Etymology ==
Lepidobotrys is derived from Greek, meaning 'scale-cluster'. The name is in reference to the cone-like arrangement of its bracts, which extend under the flowers.
