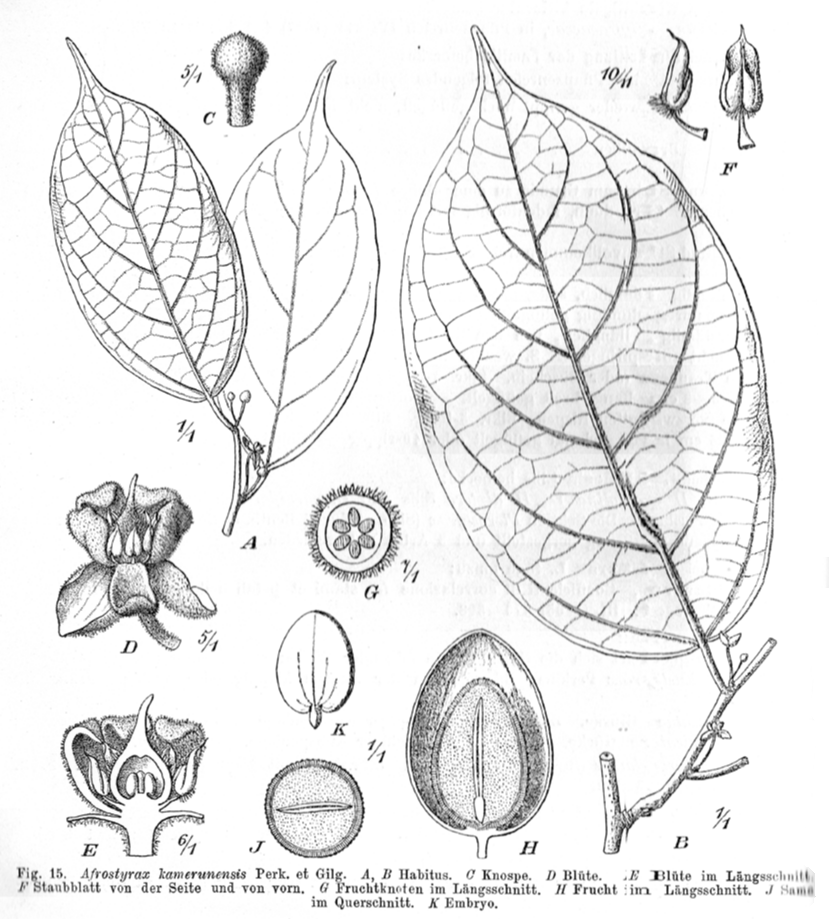
- Afrostyrax kamerunensis

Scientific classification
- Kingdom: Plantae
- Clade: Tracheophytes
- Clade: Angiosperms
- Clade: Eudicots
- Clade: Rosids
- Order: Oxalidales
- Family: Huaceae; A.Chev.

= Huaceae =

Family of flowering plants

Huaceae is a family of flowering plants in the rosids clade, which has been previously classed in the orders Malpighiales, Malvales, and Violales or in its own order Huales. The family is endemic to central and western Africa. It contains four species in the following two genera:

- Afrostyrax
- Hua

Afrostyrax includes three species, while Hua is monotypic, only including the species Hua gabonii.

== Classification ==
The APG II system placed Huaceae in the clade eurosids I, whereas the APG III system of 2009 and APG IV (2016) placed it within the Oxalidales. As of APG V (2026), following a landmark 2024 study revising much of the phylogeny of flowering plants, the family is alone in its own unnamed order-level branch (implicitly Huales), which is sister to the Celastrales and Malpighiales, all of which are now considered rosids.
