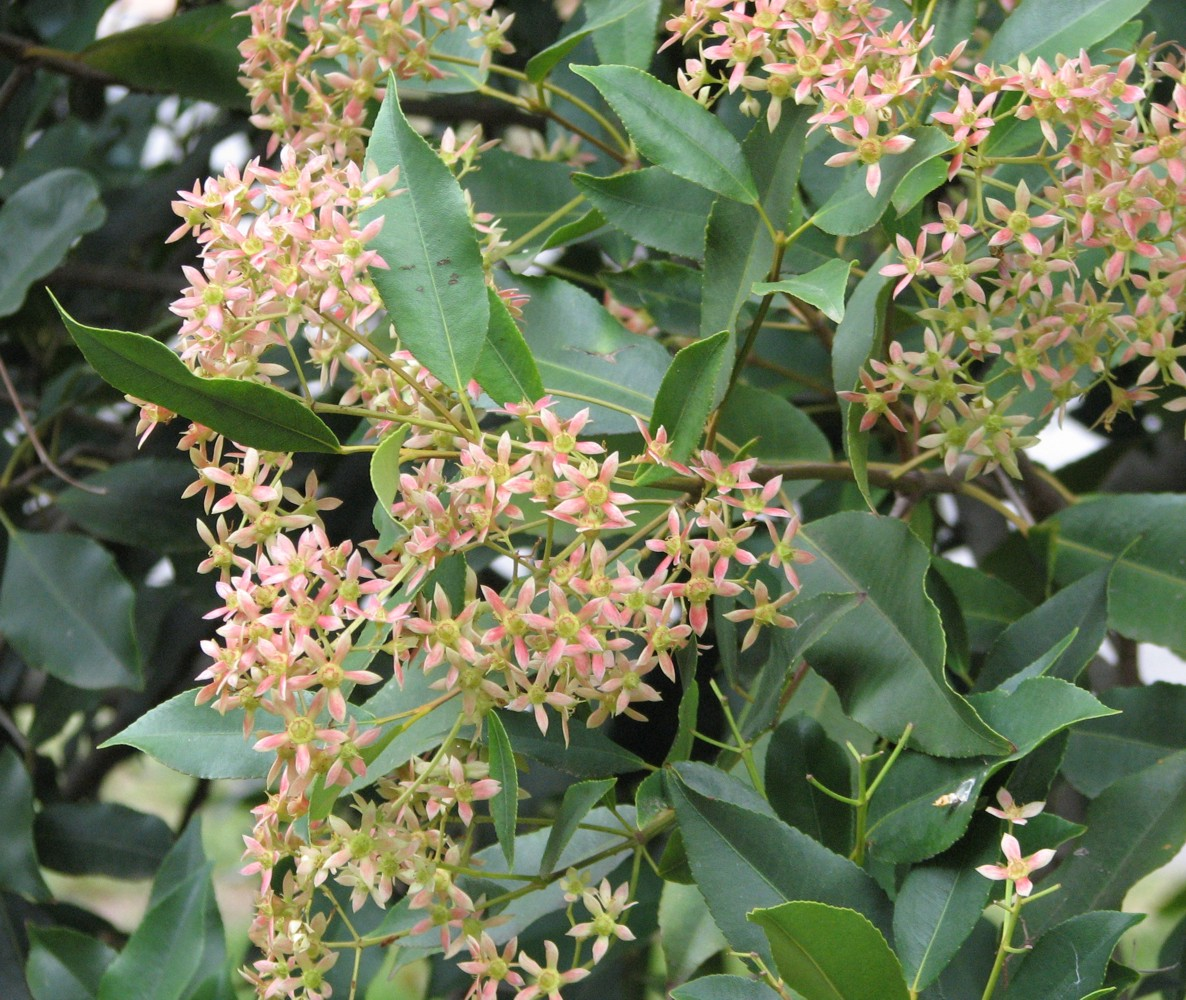
- Ceratopetalum apetalum

Scientific classification
- Kingdom: Plantae
- Clade: Tracheophytes
- Clade: Angiosperms
- Clade: Eudicots
- Clade: Rosids
- Clade: Fabids
- Order: Oxalidales; Bercht. & J.Presl

Families
- Brunelliaceae; Cephalotaceae; Connaraceae; Cunoniaceae; Elaeocarpaceae; Huaceae; Oxalidaceae

= Oxalidales =

Order of eudicot flowering plants

Oxalidales is an order of flowering plants, included within the rosid subgroup of eudicots. This group comprises seven families that contain approximately 2000 species in 58 genera. They are trees, shrubs or woody vines which are found in the wet tropics, particularly on mountains, and warm temperate zones, especially in the southern hemisphere. Compound leaves are common in Oxalidales and the majority of the species in this order have five or six sepals and petals. The following families are typically placed here:

- Family Brunelliaceae
- Family Cephalotaceae (Cephalotus follicularis)
- Family Connaraceae
- Family Cunoniaceae
- Family Elaeocarpaceae
- Family Huaceae
- Family Oxalidaceae (wood sorrel family)

The family Cephalotaceae contains a single species, a pitcher plant found in Southwest Australia.

Under the Cronquist system, most of the above families were placed in the Rosales. The Oxalidaceae were placed in the Geraniales, and the Elaeocarpaceae split between the Malvales and Polygalales, in the latter case being treated as the Tremandraceae.

== Phylogeny ==
The phylogeny of the Oxalidales shown below is adapted from the Angiosperm Phylogeny Group website.

- - Malpighiales (outgroup)
  - Oxalidales
    - Huaceae
    - - - Connaraceae
        - Oxalidaceae
      - - Cunoniaceae
        - - - Brunelliaceae
            - Cephalotaceae
          - Elaeocarpaceae
