= Ellipanthus beccarii =

Scientific classification
- Kingdom: Plantae
- Clade: Tracheophytes
- Clade: Angiosperms
- Clade: Eudicots
- Clade: Rosids
- Order: Oxalidales
- Family: Connaraceae
- Genus: Ellipanthus
- Species: E. beccarii

Binomial name
- Ellipanthus beccarii Pierre

Synonyms
- Dichapetalum tetramerum Ridl.; Ellipanthus beccarii var. peltatus (Schellenb.) Leenh.; Ellipanthus peltatus (Schellenb.) Boerl. & Koord. ex Schellenb.; Pseudellipanthus beccarii (Pierre) G.Schellenb.; Pseudellipanthus peltatus G.Schellenb.

Species of flowering plant

Ellipanthus beccarii is a plant in the family Connaraceae. It is named for the Italian botanist Odoardo Beccari.

== Description ==
Ellipanthus beccarii grows as a tree or shrub measuring up to 10 metres (30 ft) tall with a diameter of up to 15 centimetres (10 in). The unisexual flowers grow in groups of four. The stipitate fruits measure up to 1 cm (0.4 in) long.

== Distribution and habitat ==
Ellipanthus beccarii is native to Sumatra and Borneo. Its habitat is mixed dipterocarp forest.
