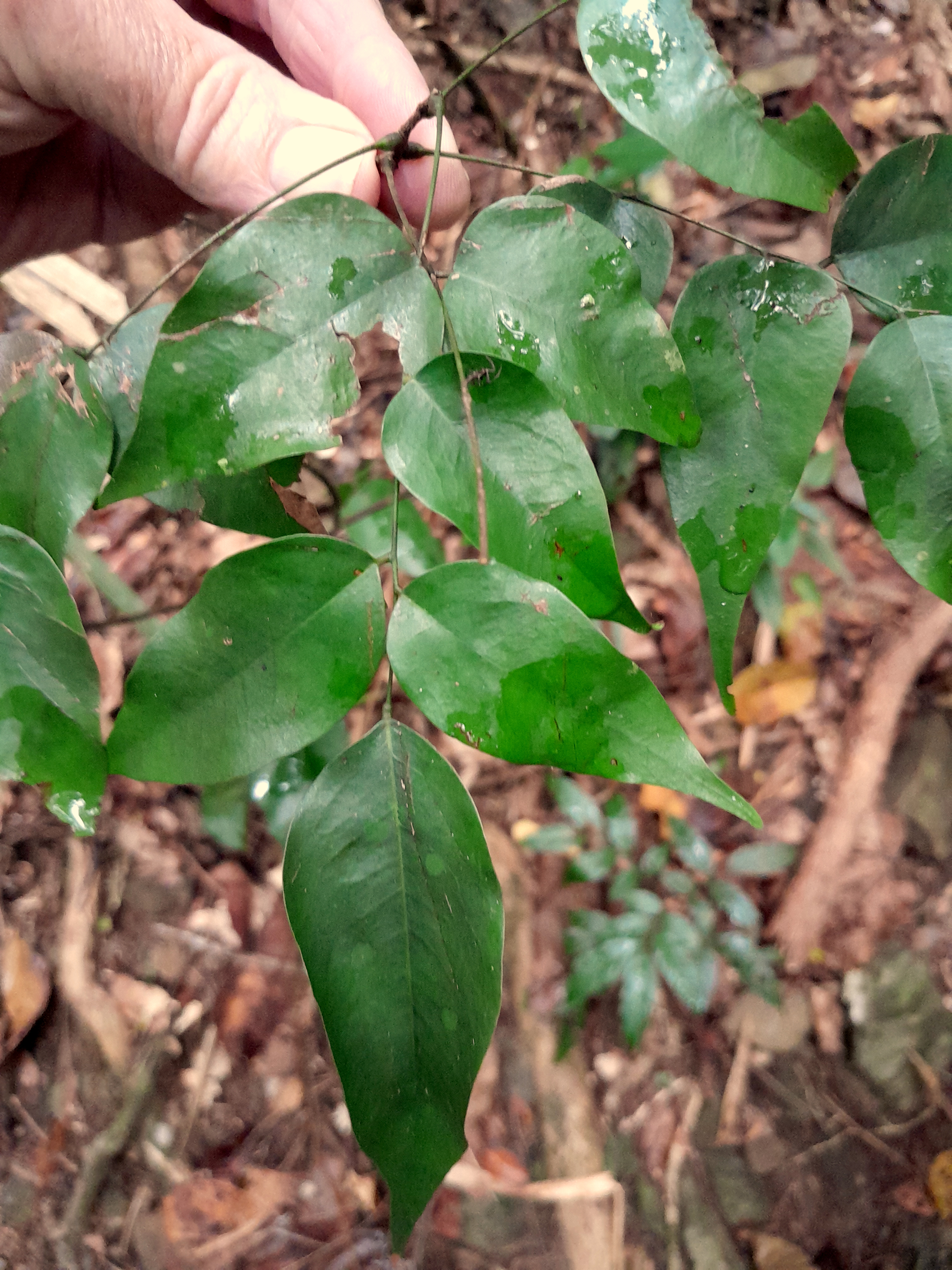
- Foliage

Conservation status
- Least Concern (NCA)

Scientific classification
- Kingdom: Plantae
- Clade: Tracheophytes
- Clade: Angiosperms
- Clade: Eudicots
- Clade: Rosids
- Order: Oxalidales
- Family: Connaraceae
- Genus: Rourea
- Species: R. brachyandra

Binomial name
- Rourea brachyandra F.Muell.
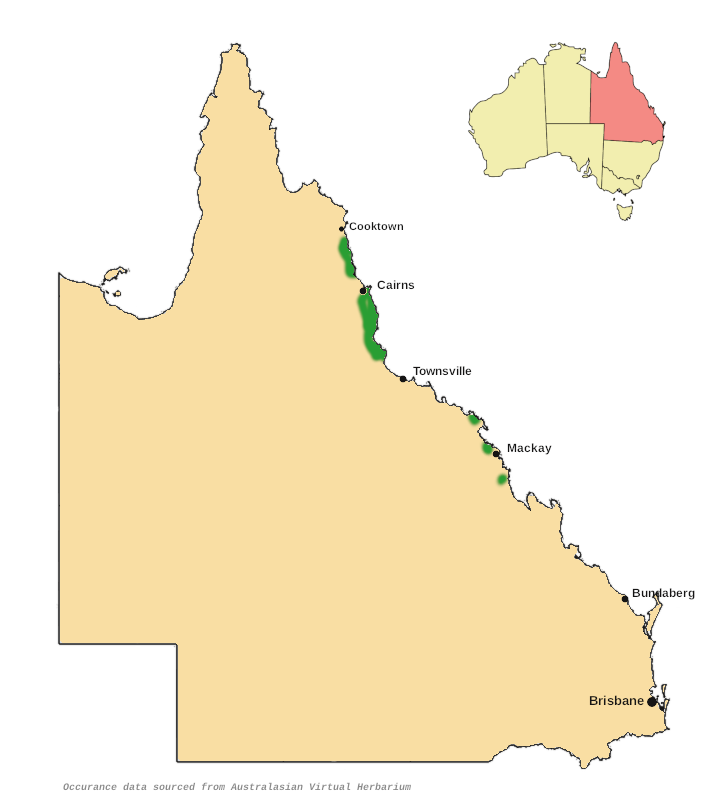

Synonyms
- Santaloides brachyandra (F.Muell.) G.Schellenb.

= Rourea brachyandra =

Water vine

Species of flowering plant

Rourea brachyandra, commonly known as water vine, is a species of plants in the family Connaraceae. It is endemic to Queensland, Australia, and is found in coastal rainforests from Rossville south to about Sarina. It was first described by Ferdinand von Mueller in 1872.

== Conservation ==
This species is listed as least concern under the Queensland Government's Nature Conservation Act. As of 9 April 2025, it has not been assessed by the International Union for Conservation of Nature (IUCN).
