= Agelaea =

Agelaea may refer to:

- Agelaea (beetle), a genus of insects in the family Carabidae
- Agelaea (plant), a genus of plants in the family Connaraceae
