= Ellipanthus tomentosus =

Conservation status
- Least Concern (IUCN 3.1)

Scientific classification
- Kingdom: Plantae
- Clade: Tracheophytes
- Clade: Angiosperms
- Clade: Eudicots
- Clade: Rosids
- Order: Oxalidales
- Family: Connaraceae
- Genus: Ellipanthus
- Species: E. tomentosus

Binomial name
- Ellipanthus tomentosus Kurz

Varieties
- Ellipanthus tomentosus var. kingii

Species of flowering plant

Ellipanthus tomentosus is a species of flowering plant in the family Connaraceae. The specific epithet tomentosus is from the Latin meaning 'thickly covered with hairs', referring to the leaves.

== Description ==
Ellipanthus tomentosus grows as a tree or shrub measuring up to 20 metres (70 ft) tall with a diameter of up to 25 centimetres (10 in). The smooth bark is greyish brown. The flowers are white. The stipitate fruits measure up to 3.5 cm (1 in) long.

== Distribution and habitat ==
Ellipanthus tomentosus grows naturally in Borneo, the Philippines and Sulawesi. Its habitat is mixed dipterocarp and peat swamp forests.
