= Connarus turczaninowii =

Scientific classification
- Kingdom: Plantae
- Clade: Tracheophytes
- Clade: Angiosperms
- Clade: Eudicots
- Clade: Rosids
- Order: Oxalidales
- Family: Connaraceae
- Genus: Connarus
- Species: C. turczaninowii

Binomial name
- Connarus turczaninowii Triana

Species of plant

Connarus turczaninowii is a dicotyledonous plant species described by José Jerónimo Triana and Planch.

It is named after Russian botanist Nikolai Turczaninow.

== Range ==
It is found in Panama.
