= Connarus agamae =

Conservation status
- Vulnerable (IUCN 2.3)

Scientific classification
- Kingdom: Plantae
- Clade: Tracheophytes
- Clade: Angiosperms
- Clade: Eudicots
- Clade: Rosids
- Order: Oxalidales
- Family: Connaraceae
- Genus: Connarus
- Species: C. agamae

Binomial name
- Connarus agamae Merr.

Species of tree

Connarus agamae is a tree in the family Connaraceae. It is named for José Agama, a former Deputy Conservator of Forests in British North Borneo.

== Description ==
Connarus agamae grows up to 20 metres (70 ft) tall with a trunk diameter of up to 20 centimetres (10 in). The obovate fruits measure up to 5 cm (2 in) long.

== Distribution and habitat ==
Connarus agamae is endemic to Sabah in Malaysian Borneo. Its habitat is mixed dipterocarp forest from sea-level to 300 metres (1,000 ft) elevation.
