= Burttia =

Burttia may refer to:

- Burttia (insect), a genus of grasshoppers in the family Acrididae
- Burttia (plant), a genus of flowering plants in the family Connaraceae
