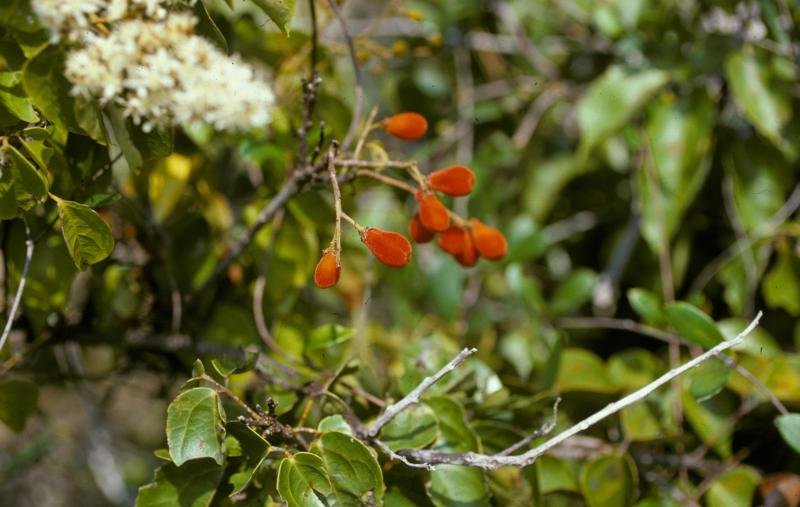

Scientific classification
- Kingdom: Plantae
- Clade: Tracheophytes
- Clade: Angiosperms
- Clade: Eudicots
- Clade: Rosids
- Order: Oxalidales
- Family: Connaraceae
- Genus: Agelaea
- Species: A. pentagyna

Binomial name
- Agelaea pentagyna (Lam.) Baill.

Synonyms
- Several, including: Agelaea elegans G. Schellenb., 1923; Connarus pentagynus Lam., 1786

= Agelaea pentagyna =

Species of flowering plant

Agelaea pentagyna is a species of flowering plant in the family Connaraceae. It is found in Africa.

The larvae of the moth Paraccra mimesa feed on the fruits of A. pentagyna.

== See also ==
- List of Southern African indigenous trees and woody lianes
