= Hemandradenia mannii =

Conservation status
- Near Threatened (IUCN 2.3)

Scientific classification
- Kingdom: Plantae
- Clade: Tracheophytes
- Clade: Angiosperms
- Clade: Eudicots
- Clade: Rosids
- Order: Oxalidales
- Family: Connaraceae
- Genus: Hemandradenia
- Species: H. mannii

Binomial name
- Hemandradenia mannii Stapf

Species of flowering plant

Hemandradenia mannii is a species of plant in the family Connaraceae. It is found in Cameroon, Central African Republic, the Republic of the Congo, the Democratic Republic of the Congo, Ivory Coast, Equatorial Guinea, Gabon, Ghana, and Nigeria. It is threatened by habitat loss.
