= Hemandradenia chevalieri =

Conservation status
- Endangered (IUCN 2.3)

Scientific classification
- Kingdom: Plantae
- Clade: Tracheophytes
- Clade: Angiosperms
- Clade: Eudicots
- Clade: Rosids
- Order: Oxalidales
- Family: Connaraceae
- Genus: Hemandradenia
- Species: H. chevalieri

Binomial name
- Hemandradenia chevalieri Stapf

Species of flowering plant

Hemandradenia chevalieri is a species of plant in the Connaraceae family. It is found in Ivory Coast and Ghana. It is threatened by habitat loss.
