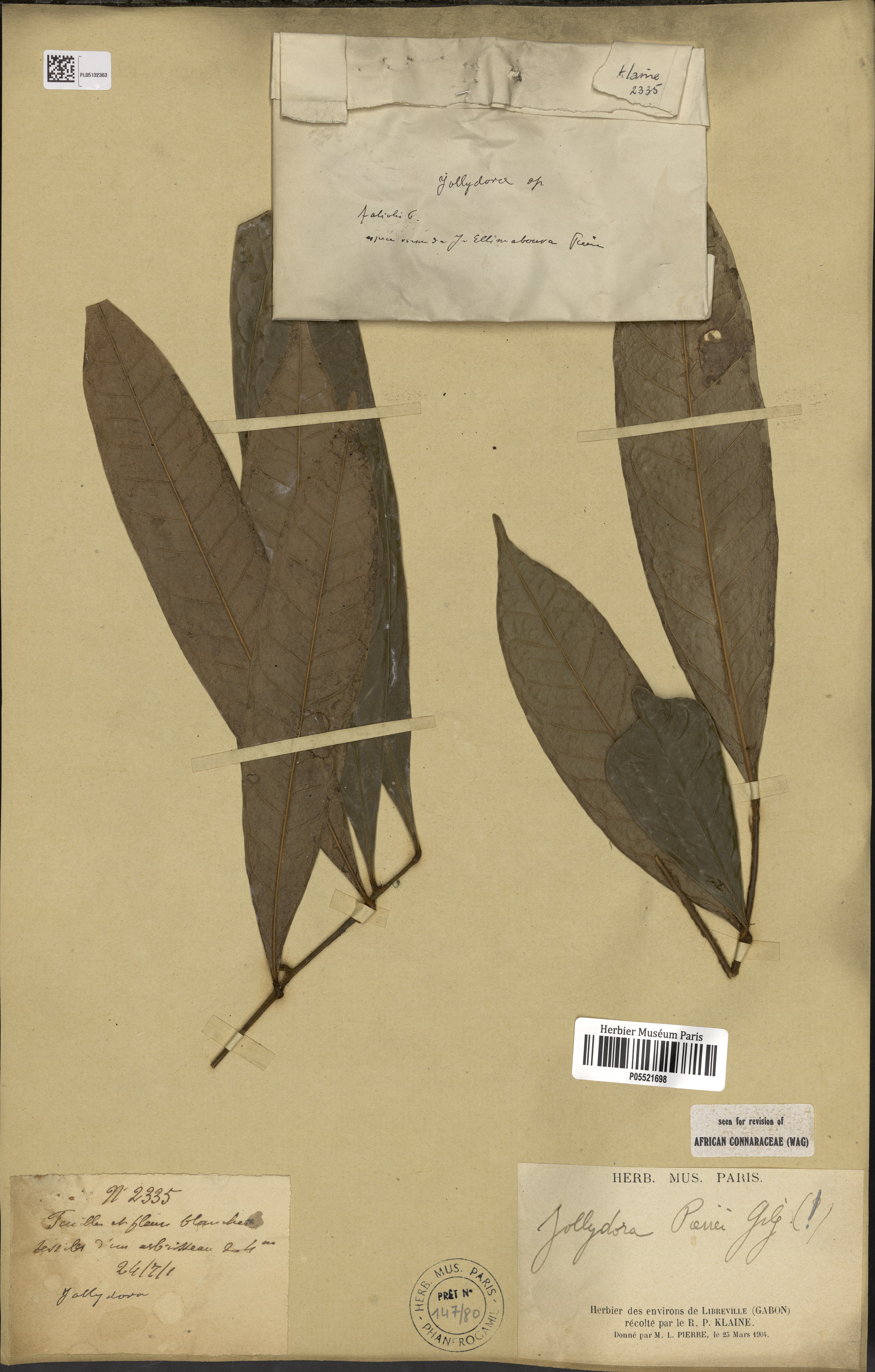

Conservation status
- Vulnerable (IUCN 3.1)

Scientific classification
- Kingdom: Plantae
- Clade: Tracheophytes
- Clade: Angiosperms
- Clade: Eudicots
- Clade: Rosids
- Order: Oxalidales
- Family: Connaraceae
- Genus: Jollydora
- Species: J. pierrei

Binomial name
- Jollydora pierrei Gilg

Synonyms
- Jollydora elimaboura Pierre ex Gilg

= Jollydora pierrei =

Species of flowering plant

Jollydora pierrei is a species of flowering plant in the family Connaraceae. It is endemic to Gabon.
