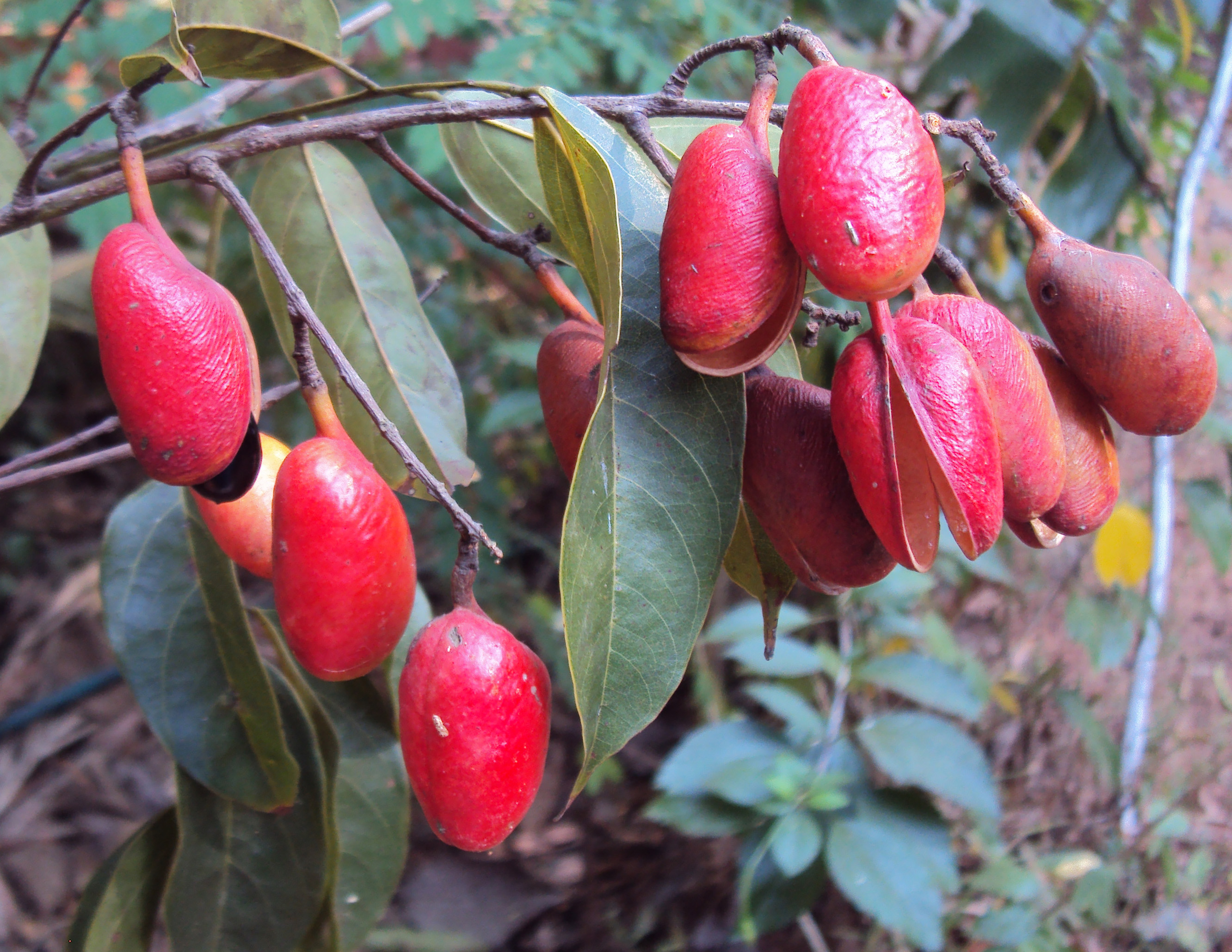
- Fruits of Connarus paniculatus

Scientific classification
- Kingdom: Plantae
- Clade: Tracheophytes
- Clade: Angiosperms
- Clade: Eudicots
- Clade: Rosids
- Order: Oxalidales
- Family: Connaraceae
- Genus: Connarus; L.

Type species
- Connarus monocarpos L.

Species
- See text

Synonyms
- Anisostemon Turcz.; Canicidia Vell.; Cynotoxicum Vell.; Erythrostigma Hassk.; Omphalobium Gaertn.; Tapomana Adans.; Tricholobus Blume

= Connarus =

Genus of flowering plants

Connarus is a genus of plants in the family Connaraceae with a pan-tropical distribution.

== Description ==
Plants in this genus are vines, shrubs or small trees. Leaves are compound, either trifoliate or imparipinnate. The inflorescences are panicles, usually terminal or axillary, individual flowers are bisexual (i.e. each having both male and female organs), pentamerous (with five parts), and covered with glands; petals are free of each other, there are ten stamens in two whorls, the inner whorl shorter, and one carpel. The fruit are flattened follicles, often with a stipe at the base and a small beak at the apex, opening on a longitudinal suture. Seeds one, black with a fleshy yellow sarcotesta.

== Distribution and habitat ==
Connarus species are distributed throughout the tropics of Africa, Asia and the Americas, and extends into some temperate areas as well (southern Brazil and southern China).

== Species ==
As of February 2025, Plants of the World Online accepts the following 106 species:

- Connarus acutissimus G.Schellenb.
- Connarus africanus Lam.
- Connarus agamae Merr.
- Connarus andamanicus M.S.Mondal
- Connarus annamensis Gagnep.
- Connarus aureus C.Toledo
- Connarus bariensis Pierre
- Connarus beyrichii Planch.
- Connarus blanchetii Planch.
- Connarus brachybotryosus Donn.Sm.
- Connarus bracteosovillosus Forero
- Connarus celatus Forero
- Connarus championii Thwaites
- Connarus cochinchinensis (Baill.) Pierre
- Connarus conchocarpus F.Muell.
- Connarus congolanus G.Schellenb.
- Connarus cordatus L.A.Vidal, Carbonó & Forero
- Connarus coriaceus G.Schellenb.
- Connarus costaricensis G.Schellenb.
- Connarus culionensis Merr.
- Connarus cuneifolius Baker
- Connarus detersoides G.Schellenb.
- Connarus detersus Planch.
- Connarus ecuadorensis G.Schellenb.
- Connarus elsae Forero
- Connarus erianthus Benth. ex Baker
- Connarus euphlebius Merr.
- Connarus fasciculatus (DC.) Planch.
- Connarus favosus Planch.
- Connarus ferrugineus Jack
- Connarus foreroi C.Toledo
- Connarus gabonensis Lemmens
- Connarus grandifolius Planch.
- Connarus grandis Jack
- Connarus griffonianus Baill.
- Connarus guggenheimii Forero
- Connarus impressinervis B.C.Stone
- Connarus incomptus Planch.
- Connarus jaramilloi Forero
- Connarus kingii G.Schellenb.
- Connarus lambertii (DC.) Sagot
- Connarus lamii Leenh.
- Connarus latifolius Wall. ex Planch.
- Connarus lentiginosus Brandegee
- Connarus longestipitatus Gilg
- Connarus longipetalus Gagnep.
- Connarus lucens G.Schellenb.
- Connarus manausensis C.Toledo & V.C.Souza
- Connarus marginatus Planch.
- Connarus marleneae Forero
- Connarus martii G.Schellenb.
- Connarus megacarpus S.F.Blake
- Connarus monocarpos L.
- Connarus nervatus Cuatrec.
- Connarus nicobaricus King
- Connarus nodosus Baker
- Connarus oblongus G.Schellenb.
- Connarus odoratus Hook.f.
- Connarus ovatifolius (Mart.) G.Schellenb.
- Connarus panamensis Griseb.
- Connarus paniculatus Roxb.
- Connarus parameswaranii Ramam. & Rajan
- Connarus patrisii (DC.) Planch.
- Connarus pedicellatus (Forero) C.Toledo
- Connarus peltatus Forman
- Connarus perrottetii (DC.) Planch.
- Connarus perturbatus Forero
- Connarus pickeringii A.Gray
- Connarus planchonianus G.Schellenb.
- Connarus poilanei Gagnep.
- Connarus popenoei Standl.
- Connarus portosegurensis Forero
- Connarus punctatus Planch.
- Connarus ramiflorus C.Toledo & V.C.Souza
- Connarus regnellii G.Schellenb.
- Connarus renteriae Carbonó, Forero & L.A.Vidal
- Connarus reticulatus Griseb.
- Connarus revolutus C.Toledo
- Connarus rostratus (Vell.) L.B.Sm.
- Connarus ruber (Poepp.) Planch.
- Connarus salomoniensis G.Schellenb.
- Connarus schultesii Standl. ex R.E.Schult.
- Connarus sclerocarpus G.Schellenb.
- Connarus semidecandrus Jack
- Connarus silvanensis Cuatrec.
- Connarus staudtii Gilg
- Connarus stenophyllus Standl. & L.O.Williams ex Ant.Molina
- Connarus steyermarkii Prance
- Connarus suberosus Planch.
- Connarus subfoveolatus Merr.
- Connarus subinaequifolius Elmer
- Connarus subpeltatus G.Schellenb.
- Connarus thonningii (DC.) G.Schellenb.
- Connarus tomentosus C.Toledo
- Connarus touranensis Gagnep.
- Connarus turczaninowii Triana & Planch.
- Connarus venezuelanus Baill.
- Connarus villosus Jack
- Connarus vulcanicus J.F.Morales
- Connarus whitfordii Merr.
- Connarus wightii Hook.f.
- Connarus williamsii Britton
- Connarus winkleri G.Schellenb.
- Connarus wurdackii Prance
- Connarus xylocarpus L.A.Vidal, Carbonó & Forero
- Connarus yunnanensis G.Schellenb.
