= Quadracaea roureae =

Scientific classification
- Kingdom: Fungi
- Division: Ascomycota
- Class: incertae sedis
- Order: incertae sedis
- Family: incertae sedis
- Genus: Quadracaea
- Species: Q. roureae

Binomial name
- Quadracaea roureae Y.D.Zhang & X.G.Zhang (2012)

Species of lichen

Quadracaea roureae is a species of fungus in the division Ascomycota. The fungus has specialised cells that produce multiple spores, flask-shaped cells that release spores by breaking open, and a unique way of shedding its spores. The type specimen of this hyphomycetes fungus was found growing on dead branches of Rourea minor in Hainan Bawangling National Nature Reserve. At the time of its original publication, it was only known to occur at the type locality in China.

== Description ==
Quadracaea roureae forms colonies on natural substrates that are spread out, brown in color, and covered in fine hairs. The mycelium, or fungal network, is partly superficial and partly embedded within the substrate. It consists of branched, septate (segmented) hyphae that are pale brown and smooth-walled, measuring 1–2 micrometres (μm) in thickness.

The conidiophores, which are the structures that bear spores, are macronematous (having well-developed stalks) and mononematous (single or unbranched). They can appear singly or in groups, and are straight or slightly curved. These structures are smooth and lighter in colour towards the apex, can grow up to 81 μm long, and are 3–4.5 μm wide. They bear separating cells at various levels.

Conidiogenous cells, which produce the spores, are more or less cylindrical, measuring 6–8.5 μm in length and 2.5–3.5 μm in width. These cells are polyblastic, meaning they produce multiple spores, and are terminal (at the end of the structure) but can become intercalary (inserted along the length). They are pale brown to brown in colour and integrated into the conidiophore structure.

Separating cells are acropleurogenous (producing spores at the tip and along the sides), ampulliform (flask-shaped), and taper towards the apex. After spore release, these cells appear empty with an open end. They are pale brown in colour.

The conidia (asexual spores) are solitary, dry, and obpyriform (pear-shaped). They have three transverse septa and are slightly constricted at these points. Conidia measure 20–26.5 μm in length and 7.5–9.5 μm in width. The basal cell of the conidium is smooth and pale brown, featuring a prominent frill at the base. The second and third cells are thick-walled and dark brown, with the second cell being broader and darker. The apical cell is narrowly conical, pointed, and colourless or nearly so.

The synanamorph (an alternate form) of Quadracaea roureae resembles Selenosporell. The apical cell of each conidial arm produces blastic (budding) conidia that are fusiform (spindle-shaped), slightly curved, aseptate (without septa), and hyaline (glassy). These secondary conidia measure 4.5–5.5 μm in length and 0.6–1 μm in width.
