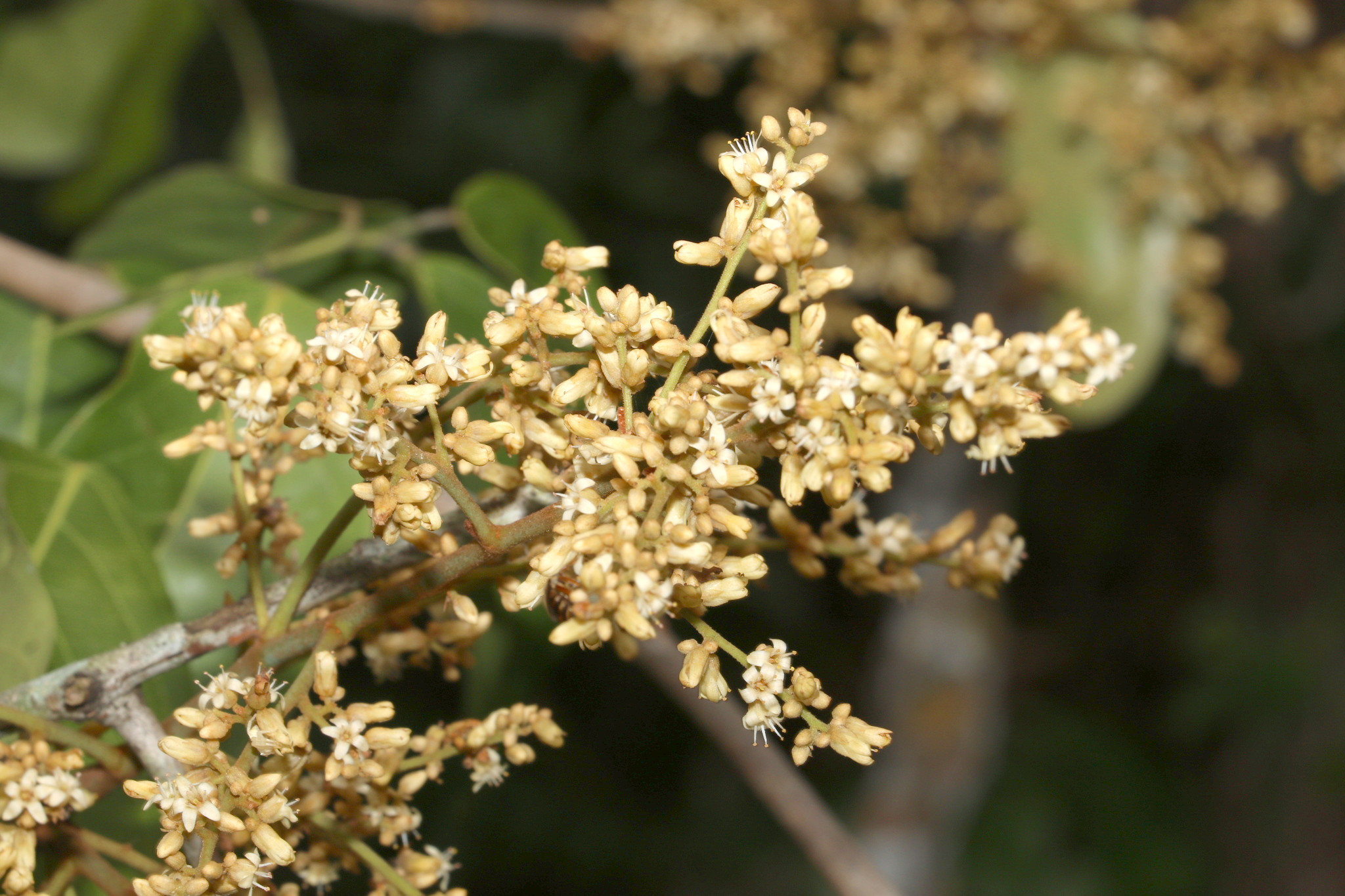
- Inflorescence

Conservation status
- Least Concern (NCA)

Scientific classification
- Kingdom: Plantae
- Clade: Tracheophytes
- Clade: Angiosperms
- Clade: Eudicots
- Clade: Rosids
- Order: Oxalidales
- Family: Connaraceae
- Genus: Connarus
- Species: C. conchocarpus

Binomial name
- Connarus conchocarpus F.Muell.

Synonyms
- Tricholobus conchocarpus (F.Muell.) Domin

= Connarus conchocarpus =

Species of flowering plant

Connarus conchocarpus, commonly known as scarlet shell vine, is a species of climbing plant in the family Connaraceae native to New Guinea and the state of Queensland, Australia. It is a woody vine with a stem up to 12 cm (4.7 in) diameter, leaves with three or five leaflets, and shiny red capsular fruit containing one seed. It was first described in 1865 and has a conservation status of least concern.

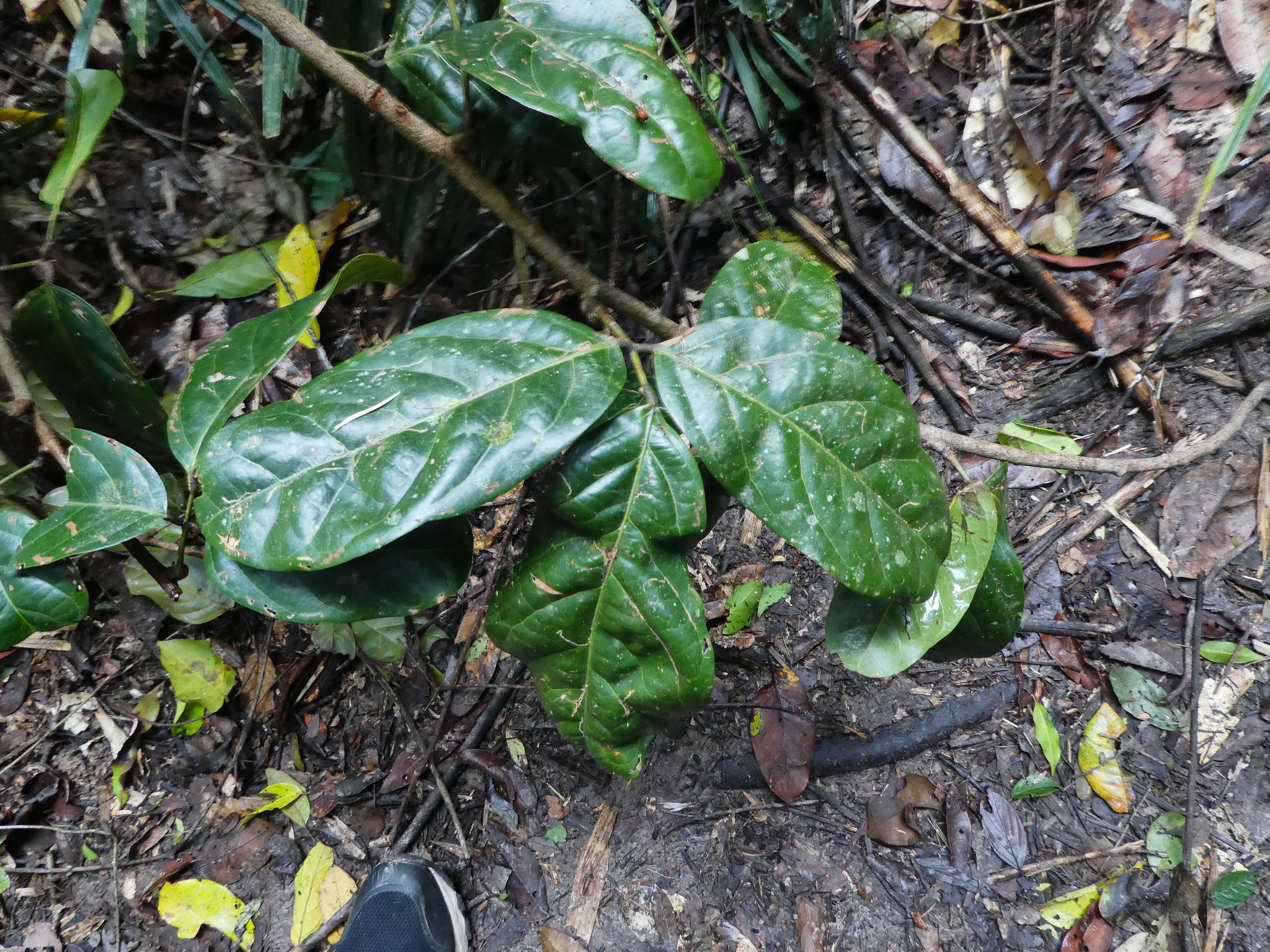
Trifoliate leaf

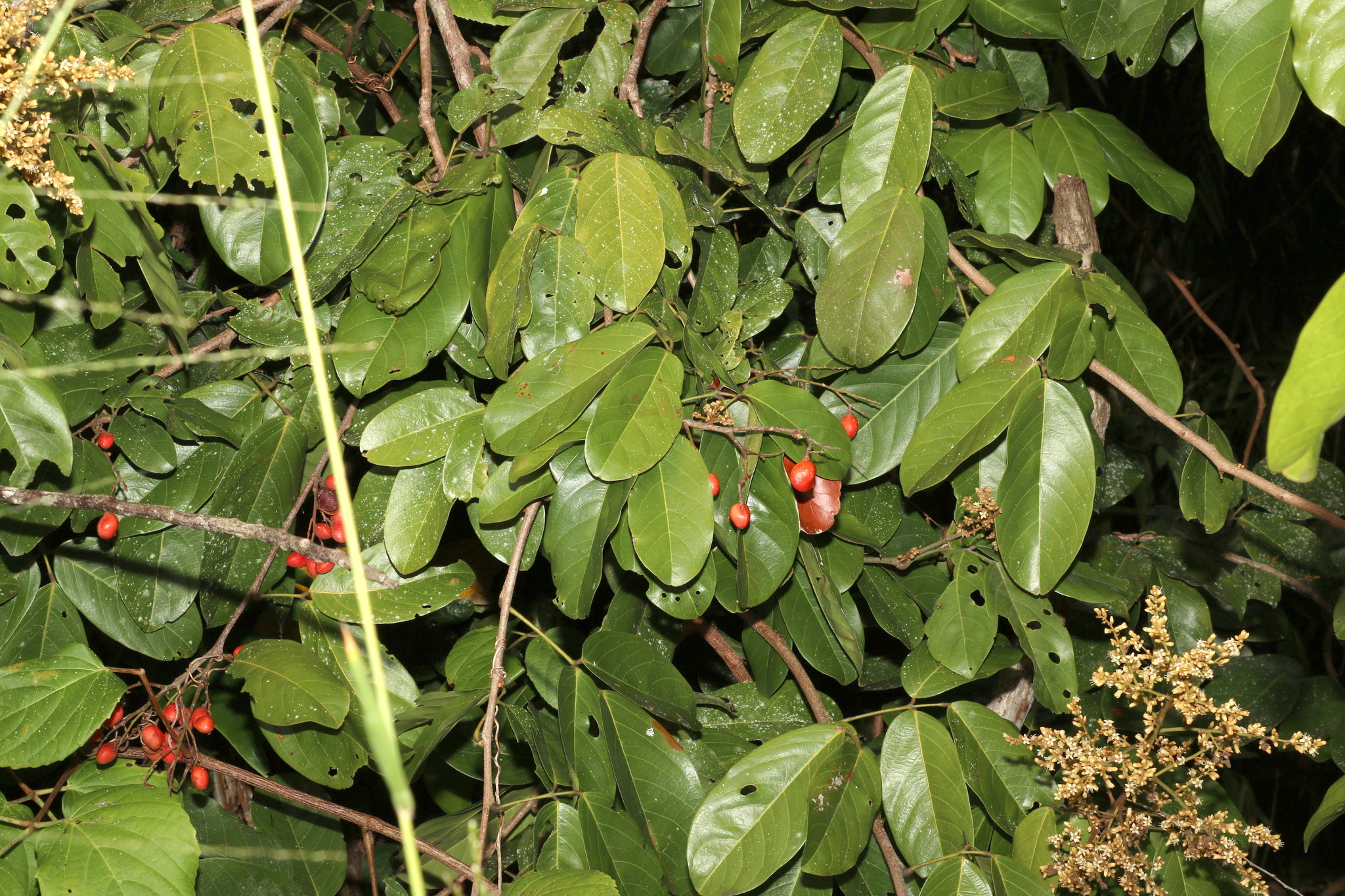
Leaves and fruit

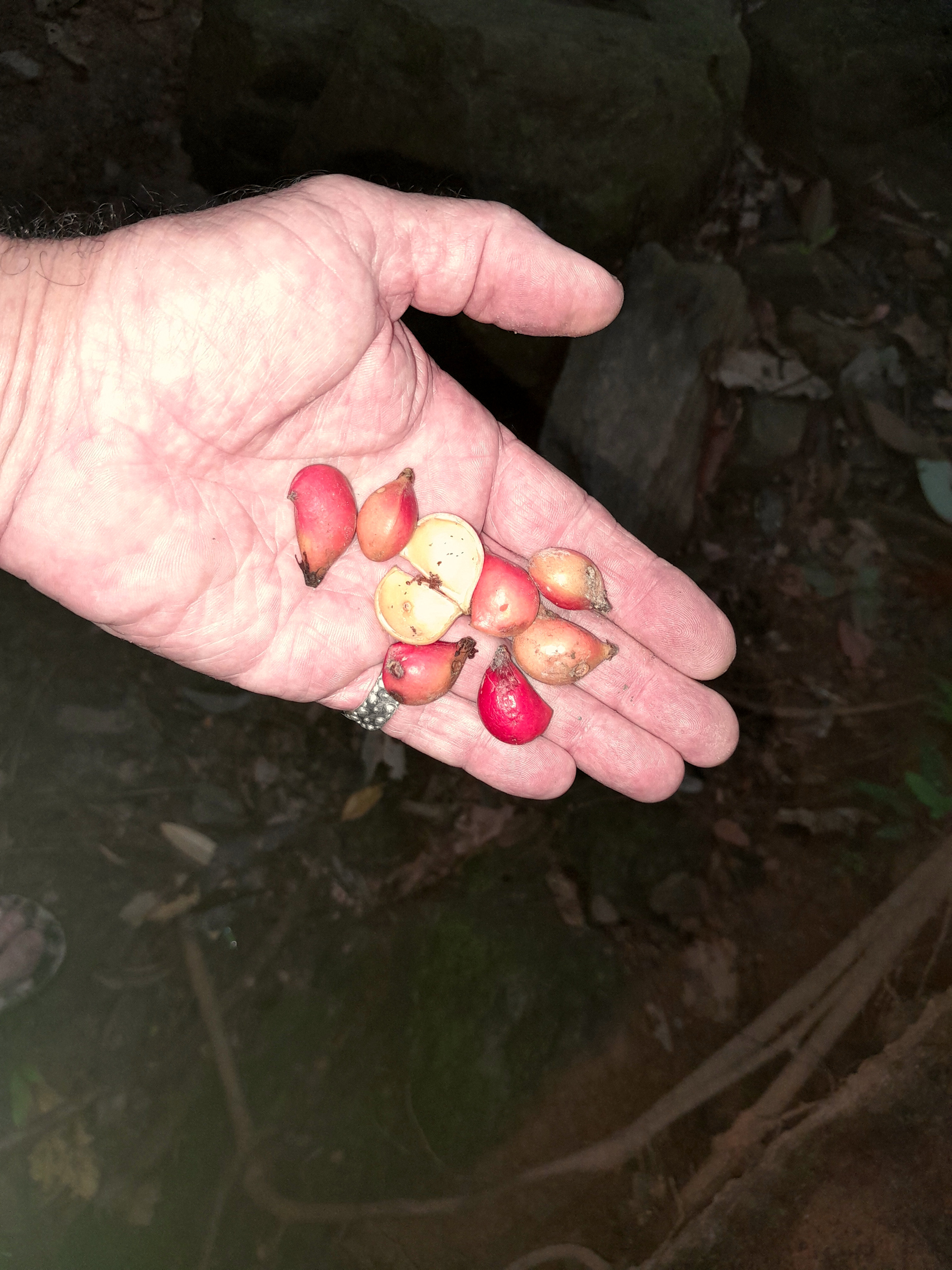
Fruit
