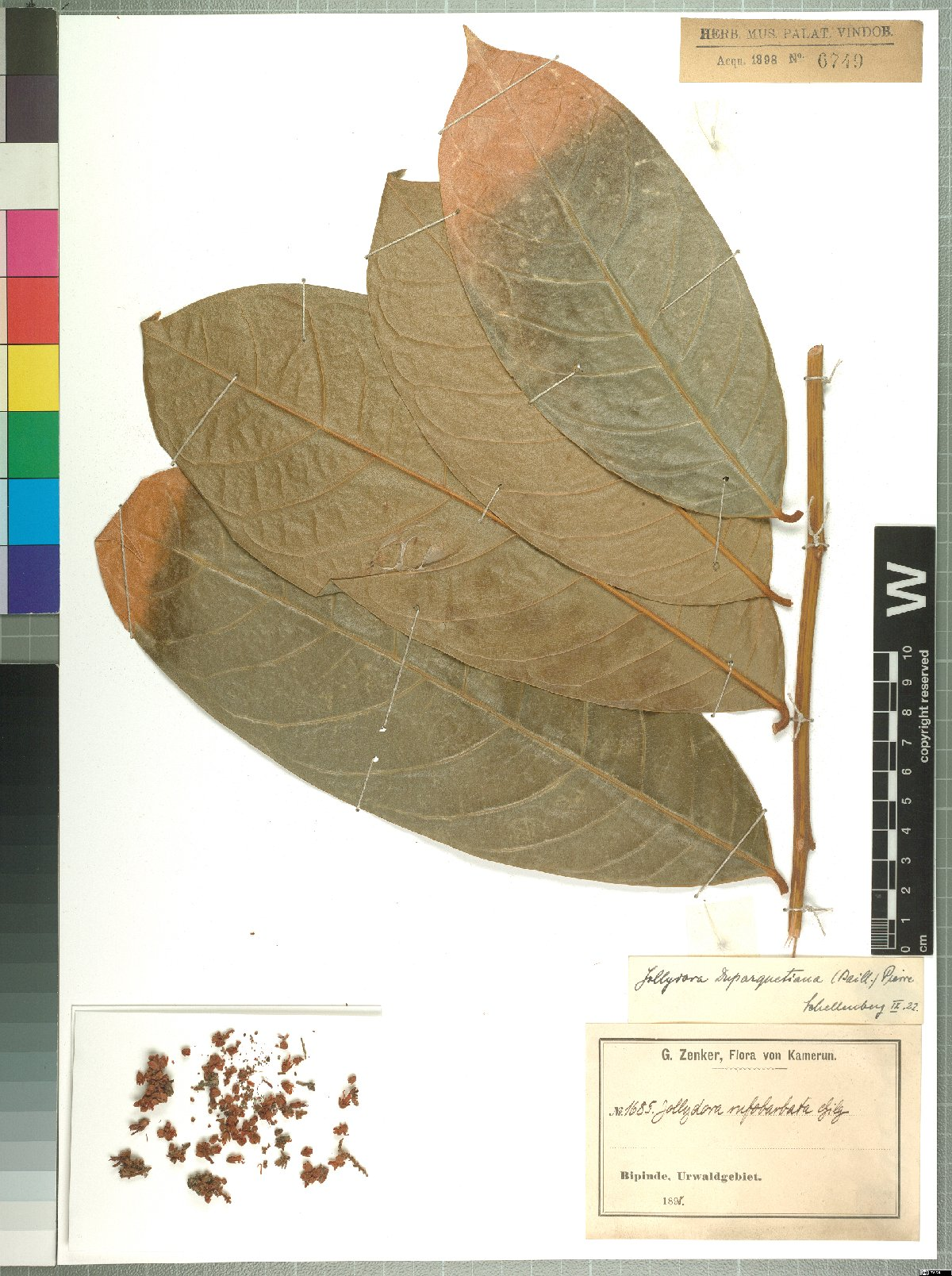

Conservation status
- Vulnerable (IUCN 2.3)

Scientific classification
- Kingdom: Plantae
- Clade: Tracheophytes
- Clade: Angiosperms
- Clade: Eudicots
- Clade: Rosids
- Order: Oxalidales
- Family: Connaraceae
- Genus: Jollydora
- Species: J. glandulosa

Binomial name
- Jollydora glandulosa Schellenb.

= Jollydora glandulosa =

Species of flowering plant

Jollydora glandulosa is a species of plant in the Connaraceae family. It is found in Cameroon and Nigeria.
