= Quadracaea mediterranea =

Scientific classification
- Kingdom: Fungi
- Division: Ascomycota
- Class: incertae sedis
- Order: incertae sedis
- Family: incertae sedis
- Genus: Quadracaea
- Species: Q. mediterranea

Binomial name
- Quadracaea mediterranea Lunghini, Pinzari & Zucconi (1996)

Species of lichen

Quadracaea mediterranea is a species of fungus in the division Ascomycota. This hyphomycetes fungus, which is the type species of its genus, was formally described as a new species in 1996. The type specimen of the fungus was collected by Dario Lunghini from fallen leaves of holm oak (Quercus ilex) in the Rio Marina area on the Island of Elba, Italy, on 8 November 1989. Since its original description from European samples, it has also been recorded from Brazil, China, and India.
