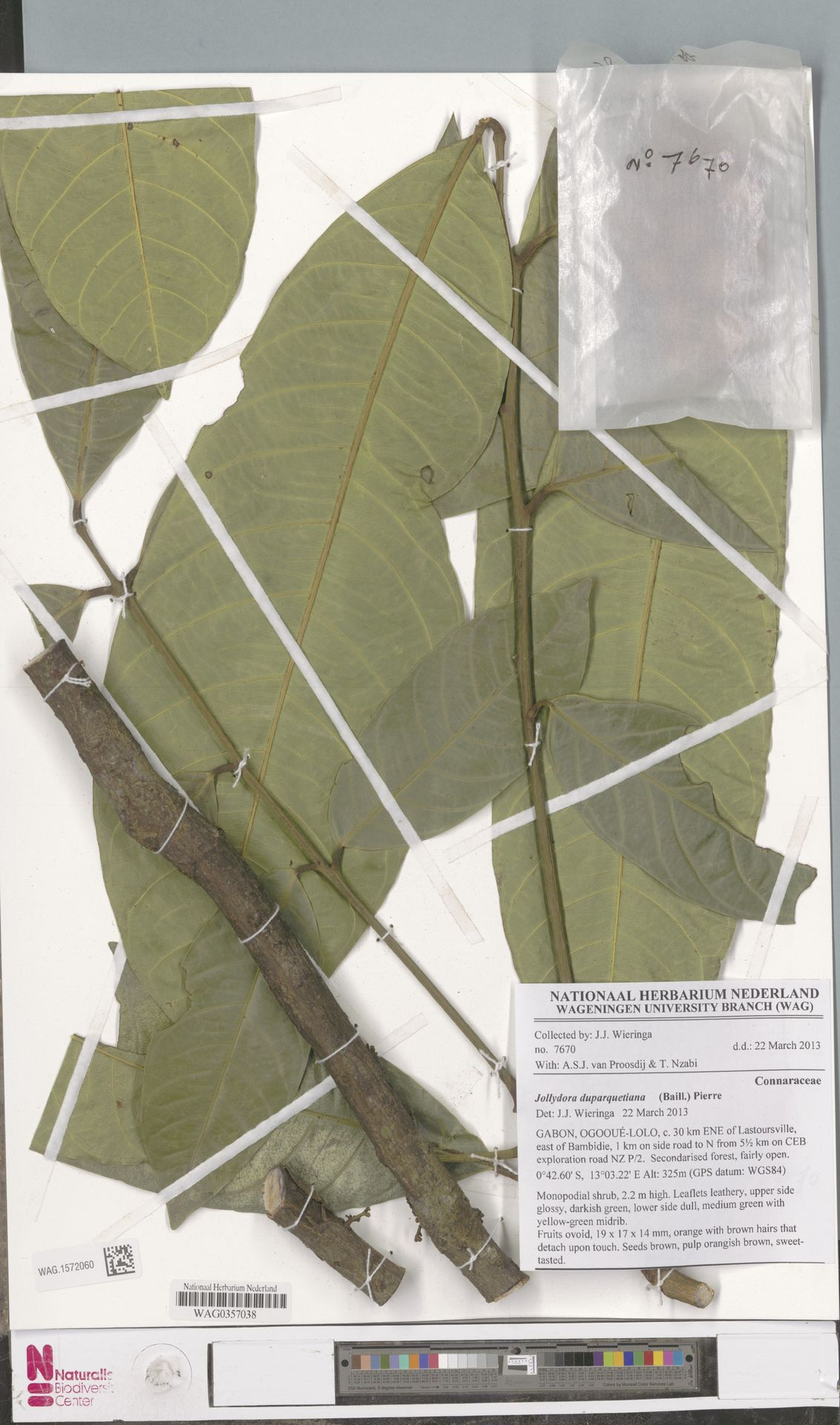

Scientific classification
- Kingdom: Plantae
- Clade: Tracheophytes
- Clade: Angiosperms
- Clade: Eudicots
- Clade: Rosids
- Order: Oxalidales
- Family: Connaraceae
- Genus: Jollydora; Pierre ex Gilg

Synonyms
- Anthagathis Harms; Ebandoua Pellegr.

= Jollydora =

Genus of flowering plants

Jollydora is a genus of plant in family Connaraceae.

It contains the following species (list may be incomplete):

- Jollydora glandulosa, Schellenb.
- Jollydora pierrei, Gilg
