= Vismianthus =

Scientific classification
- Kingdom: Plantae
- Clade: Embryophytes
- Clade: Tracheophytes
- Clade: Angiosperms
- Clade: Eudicots
- Clade: Rosids
- Order: Oxalidales
- Family: Connaraceae
- Genus: Vismianthus; Mildbr.

Synonyms
- Heterotypic Synonyms: Schellenbergia C.E.Parkinson

Genus of flowering plants

Vismianthus is a genus of flowering plants belonging to the family Connaraceae. Its native range is Tanzania, Myanmar.

Species:

- Vismianthus punctatus Mildbr.
- Vismianthus sterculiifolius (Prain) Breteler & J.Brouwer
