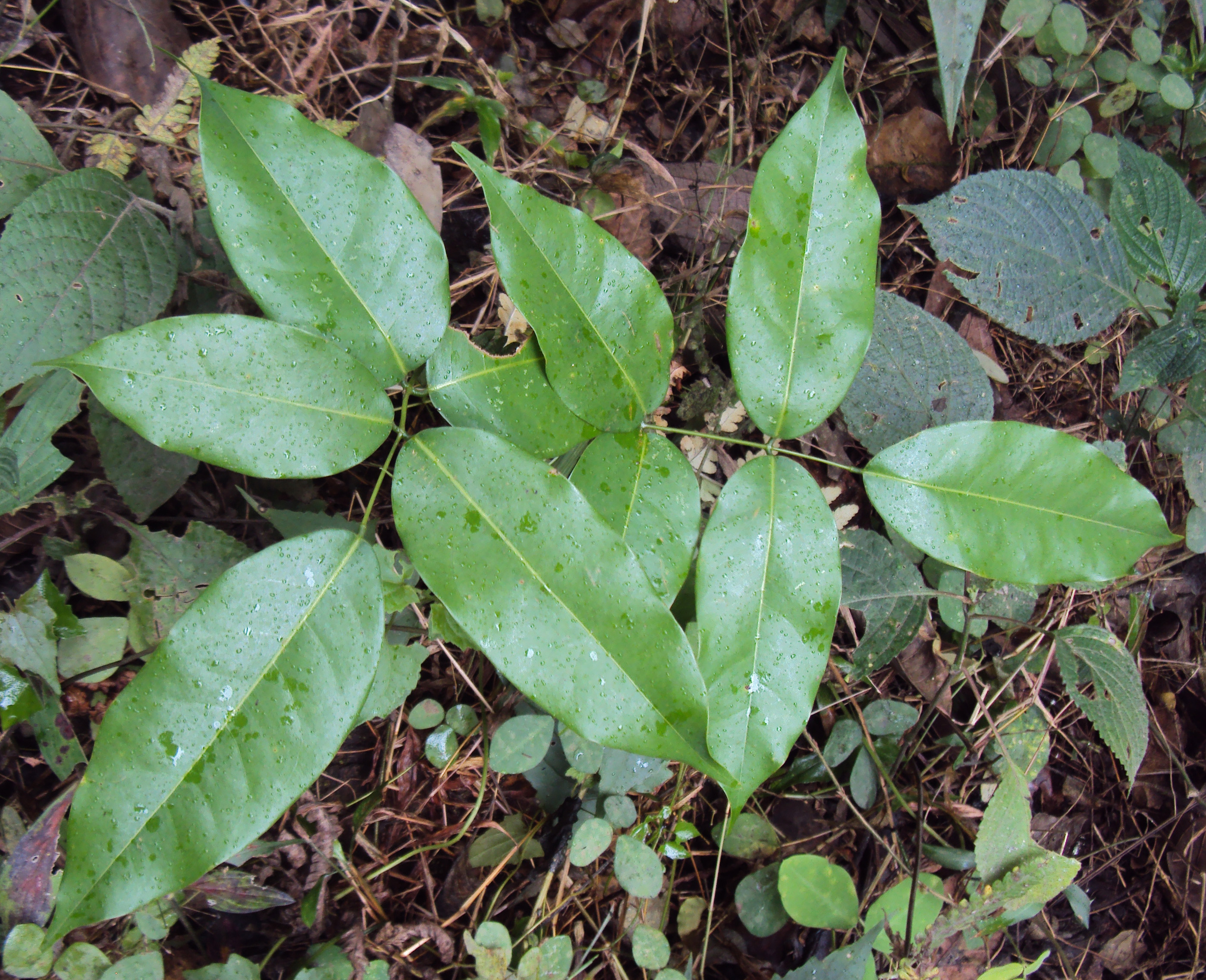
- Rourea minor

Scientific classification
- Kingdom: Plantae
- Clade: Tracheophytes
- Clade: Angiosperms
- Clade: Eudicots
- Clade: Rosids
- Order: Oxalidales
- Family: Connaraceae
- Genus: Rourea; Aubl.

Synonyms
- List: Bernardinia Planch.; Byrsocarpus Schumach.; Eichleria Progel; Jaundea Gilg; Kalawael Adans.; Malbrancia Neck.; Paxia Gilg; Pterotum Lour.; Robergia Schreb.; Roureopsis Planch.; Santalodes L. ex Kuntze; Santaloidella G.Schellenb.; Santaloides G.Schellenb.; Spiropetalum Gilg; Taeniochlaena Hook.f.; Tali Adans.; Yaundea G.Schellenb.

= Rourea =

Genus of flowering plants

Rourea is a genus of flowering plants in the family Connaraceae. The species in this genus are found worldwide across the tropics and subtropics.

== Species ==
Currently accepted species include:

- Rourea accrescens Forero
- Rourea acutipetala Miq.
- Rourea adenophora S.F.Blake
- Rourea amazonica (Baker) Radlk.
- Rourea antioquensis Cuatrec.
- Rourea araguaensis Forero
- Rourea aspleniifolia (G.Schellenb.) Jongkind
- Rourea bahiensis Forero
- Rourea balansana Baill.
- Rourea blanchetiana (Progel) Kuhlm.
- Rourea brachyandra F.Muell.
- Rourea breviracemosa Gamble
- Rourea calophylla (Gilg ex G.Schellenb.) Jongkind
- Rourea calophylloides (G.Schellenb.) Jongkind
- Rourea camptoneura Radlk.
- Rourea carvalhoi Forero, Carbonó & L.A.Vidal
- Rourea cassioides Hiern
- Rourea caudata Planch.
- Rourea chrysomalla Glaz. & G.Schellenb.
- Rourea cnestidifolia G.Schellenb.
- Rourea coccinea (Schumach. & Thonn.) Benth.
- Rourea confundens (Leenh.) Jongkind
- Rourea cuspidata Benth. ex Baker
- Rourea discolor Baker
- Rourea doniana Baker
- Rourea duckei Huber
- Rourea emarginata (Jack) Jongkind
- Rourea erythrocalyx (Gilg ex G.Schellenb.) Jongkind
- Rourea fluminensis (Gardner) Jongkind
- Rourea foreroi Aymard & P.E.Berry
- Rourea frutescens Aubl.
- Rourea fulgens Planch.
- Rourea gardneriana Planch.
- Rourea glabra Kunth
- Rourea glazioui G.Schellenb.
- Rourea gracilis G.Schellenb.
- Rourea grosourdyana Baill.
- Rourea harmandiana Pierre
- Rourea induta Planch.
- Rourea kappleri Lanj.
- Rourea krukovii Steyerm.
- Rourea latifoliolata Standl. & L.O.Williams
- Rourea laurifolia G.Schellenb.
- Rourea ligulata Baker
- Rourea luizalbertoi Forero, L.A.Vidal & Carbonó
- Rourea macrocalyx Carbonó, Forero & L.A.Vidal
- Rourea martiana Baker
- Rourea microphylla (Hook. & Arn.) Planch.
- Rourea mimosoides (Vahl) Planch.
- Rourea minor (Gaertn.) Alston
- Rourea myriantha Baill.
- Rourea neglecta G.Schellenb.
- Rourea obliquifoliolata Gilg
- Rourea oligophlebia Merr.
- Rourea omissa Forero
- Rourea orientalis Baill.
- Rourea ovalis (G.Schellenb.) Leenh.
- Rourea paraensis Forero
- Rourea parviflora Gilg
- Rourea pinnata (Merr.) Veldkamp
- Rourea pittieri S.F.Blake
- Rourea prainiana Talbot
- Rourea prancei Forero
- Rourea psammophila Forero
- Rourea pseudogardneriana Forero, Carbonó & L.A.Vidal
- Rourea pseudospadicea G.Schellenb.
- Rourea puberula Baker
- Rourea pubescens (DC.) Radlk.
- Rourea radlkoferiana K.Schum.
- Rourea revoluta Planch.
- Rourea rugosa Planch.
- Rourea schippii Standl.
- Rourea solanderi Baker
- Rourea sprucei G.Schellenb.
- Rourea stenopetala (Griff.) Hook.f.
- Rourea suerrensis Donn.Sm.
- Rourea surinamensis Miq.
- Rourea tenuis G.Schellenb.
- Rourea thomsonii (Baker) Jongkind
- Rourea thonneri De Wild.
- Rourea vulcanicola Forero
