= Paraccra =

Scientific classification
- Kingdom: Animalia
- Phylum: Arthropoda
- Clade: Pancrustacea
- Class: Insecta
- Order: Lepidoptera
- Family: Tortricidae
- Tribe: Tortricini
- Genus: Paraccra; Razowski, 2005

Genus of tortrix moths

Paraccra is a genus of moths belonging to the family Tortricidae.

== Species ==
- Paraccra chorogiae Razowski, 2012
- Paraccra mimesa Razowski, 2005

== See also ==
- List of Tortricidae genera
