= Agelaea himalayica =

Scientific classification
- Domain: Eukaryota
- Kingdom: Animalia
- Phylum: Arthropoda
- Class: Insecta
- Order: Coleoptera
- Suborder: Adephaga
- Family: Carabidae
- Genus: Agelaea
- Species: A. himalayica

Binomial name
- Agelaea himalayica Jedlička, 1965

Species of beetle

Agelaea himalayica is a species of ground beetle from the Platyninae subfamily that is endemic to Nepal.
