= Agelaea fulva =

- Illustration from the protologue

Scientific classification
- Domain: Eukaryota
- Kingdom: Animalia
- Phylum: Arthropoda
- Class: Insecta
- Order: Coleoptera
- Suborder: Adephaga
- Family: Carabidae
- Genus: Agelaea
- Species: A. fulva

Binomial name
- Agelaea fulva Gene, 1839

Species of beetle

Agelaea fulva is a species of ground beetle from the Platyninae subfamily that is endemic to Sardinia.
