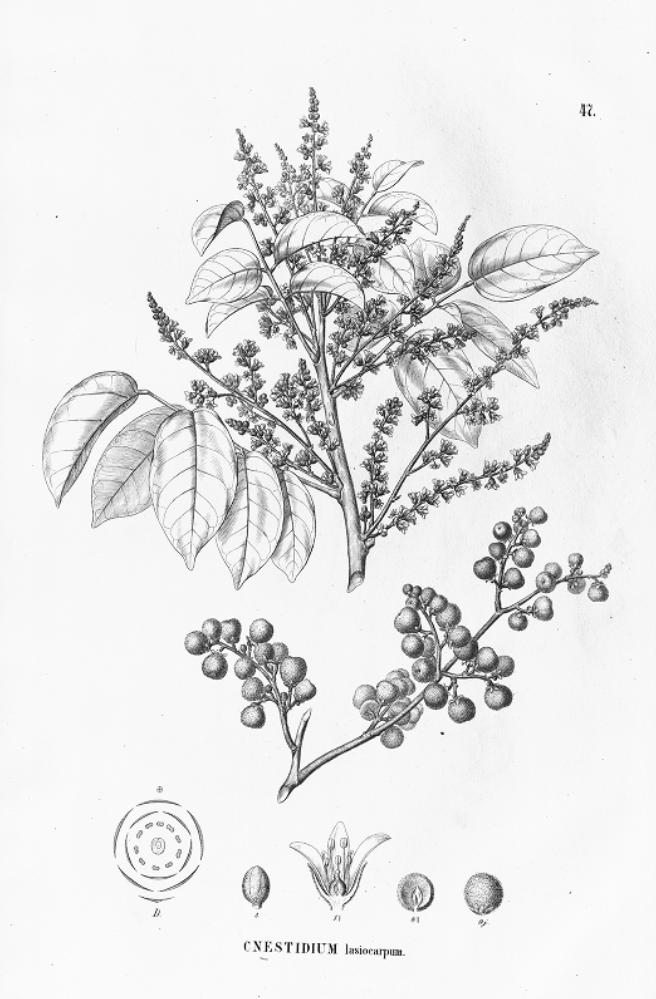
- Cnestidium lasiocarpum

Scientific classification
- Kingdom: Plantae
- Clade: Tracheophytes
- Clade: Angiosperms
- Clade: Eudicots
- Clade: Rosids
- Order: Oxalidales
- Family: Connaraceae
- Genus: Cnestidium; Planch.

= Cnestidium =

Genus of flowering plants

Cnestidium is a genus of flowering plants belonging to the family Connaraceae.

Its native range is Mexico to Tropical America.

Species:

- Cnestidium bakerianum (Britton) G.Schellenb.
- Cnestidium froesii Pires
- Cnestidium guianense (Schellenb.) G.Schellenb.
- Cnestidium rufescens Planch.
