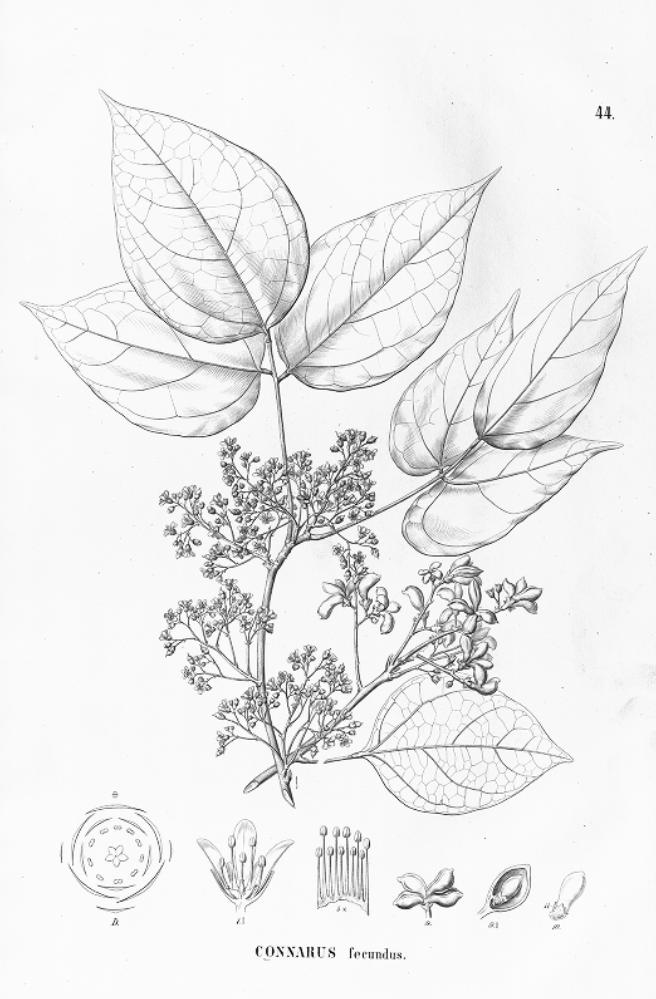
- An illustration of the plant Connarus Fecundus

Scientific classification
- Kingdom: Plantae
- Clade: Tracheophytes
- Clade: Angiosperms
- Clade: Eudicots
- Clade: Rosids
- Order: Oxalidales
- Family: Connaraceae
- Genus: Pseudoconnarus; Radlk.

= Pseudoconnarus =

Genus of plants

Pseudoconnarus is a genus of flowering plants belonging to the family Connaraceae.

Its native range is Southern Tropical America.

Species:

- Pseudoconnarus agelaeoides (G.Schellenb.) Forero
- Pseudoconnarus agelifolius Cuatrec.
- Pseudoconnarus macrophyllus (Poepp.) Radlk.
- Pseudoconnarus rhynchosioides (Standl.) Prance
- Pseudoconnarus subtriplinervis (Radlk.) G.Schellenb.
