= Paraccra mimesa =

Scientific classification
- Domain: Eukaryota
- Kingdom: Animalia
- Phylum: Arthropoda
- Class: Insecta
- Order: Lepidoptera
- Family: Tortricidae
- Genus: Paraccra
- Species: P. mimesa

Binomial name
- Paraccra mimesa Razowski, 2005

Species of moth

Paraccra mimesa is a species of moth of the family Tortricidae. It is found in Kenya and Tanzania.

The wingspan is about 14 mm.

The larvae feed on the fruit of Agelaea pentagyna and Rourea thomsoni.
