= Quadracaea =

Scientific classification
- Kingdom: Fungi
- Division: Ascomycota
- Subdivision: Pezizomycotina
- Class: incertae sedis
- Order: incertae sedis
- Family: incertae sedis
- Genus: Quadracaea; Lunghini, Pinzari & Zucconi (1996)

Type species
- Quadracaea mediterranea Lunghini, Pinzari & Zucconi (1996)

Species
- Q. mediterranea Q. roureae Q. stauroconidia

Fungal genus

Quadracaea is a fungal genus in the division Ascomycota. The relationship of this taxon to other taxa within the division is unknown (incertae sedis), and it has not yet been placed with certainty into any class, order, or family. The genus contains three species of hyphomycetes (anamorphic fungi). Quadracea is characterised by its distinctive spore-producing structures and the unique appearance and morphology of its spores.

== Taxonomy ==
The genus was circumscribed in 1996, with Quadracaea mediterranea assigned as the type, and, at the time, only species. The type specimen of Q. mediterranea was collected from Quercus ilex leaf litter in Italy. The genus name honours the mycologist Livio Quadraccia (1958–1993). Initially monotypic, two additional species were added to the genus in 2012 and 2013.

== Description ==
Quadracea consists of fungi that form colonies which can be found growing both on the surface and within natural substrates. These colonies range in colour from brown to dark brown and are typically covered in fine hairs. The mycelium, or fungal network, can be either superficial or submerged in the substrate, presenting a coloration from yellow to brown. It consists of branched, septate (segmented) hyphae that are smooth and can be up to 4 μm wide. These hyphae often become swollen at the base of the structures that bear spores, known as conidiophores.

Conidiophores in Quadracea can be solitary or grouped in small clusters. They are straight or slightly curved, smooth, and vary in colour from light brown at the top to darker brown at the base. These structures can reach up to 250 μm in length and taper towards the tip.

The cells that produce spores, called conidiogenous cells, are located at the ends of the conidiophores. These cells are cylindrical and produce spores in a polyblastic manner, meaning multiple spores are formed at once. They are similar in colour to the conidiophores and range in size from 5.7 to 9 μm long by 3.6 to 5 μm wide.

Separating cells, which are responsible for releasing the spores, are ampulliform (flask-shaped) and may be found singly or in whorls of up to seven. These cells are thin-walled and pale brown, and they open to release the spores after a specific type of secession.

The spores, or conidia, are dry, ranging from subovate (egg-shaped) to obpyriform (pear-shaped), and typically have three transverse septa, though sometimes four. These spores are moderately constricted at the septa and vary in size from 20 to 28.5 μm long by 8.2 to 12 μm wide. The basal cell of the spore is thicker-walled and smooth, while the second and third cells are very thick-walled and dark brown. The apical cell is thinner-walled and subhyaline (almost glassy), with a small conical protrusion at the tip that can produce smaller secondary spores known as phialoconidia.

=== Similar genera ===
Quadracaea is closely related to the genera Uberispora and Physalidiopsis based on the presence of a synanamorph and rhexolytic conidial secession. However, Uberispora differs by not producing separating cells and having a distinct arrangement of satellite cells around the central conidial cell. In contrast, Physalidiopsis is distinguished from Quadracaea by the production of short branches on the conidiophores. Additionally, the presence of stauroconidia in Physalidiopsis has been used as a key distinguishing characteristic.

== Habitat and distribution ==
Quadracea species are believed to be saprophytic, meaning they obtain nutrients by decomposing organic matter. They have been found on rotten wood, branches, twigs, bark, and leaves of various trees and shrubs, as well as on decaying herbaceous materials. These fungi thrive in both freshwater and terrestrial environments.

== Species ==
- Quadracaea mediterranea Lunghini, Pinzari & Zucconi (1996) – Brazil; China; India; Italy
- Quadracaea roureae Y.D.Zhang & X.G.Zhang (2012) – China
- Quadracaea stauroconidia F.R.Barbosa & Gusmão (2013) – Brazil

== See also ==
- List of Ascomycota genera incertae sedis
