= Paraccra chorogiae =

Scientific classification
- Domain: Eukaryota
- Kingdom: Animalia
- Phylum: Arthropoda
- Class: Insecta
- Order: Lepidoptera
- Family: Tortricidae
- Genus: Paraccra
- Species: P. chorogiae

Binomial name
- Paraccra chorogiae Razowski, 2012

Species of moth

Paraccra chorogiae is a species of moth of the family Tortricidae. It is found in Kenya.

The wingspan is about 16 mm.

== Etymology ==
The species name refers to the type locality.
