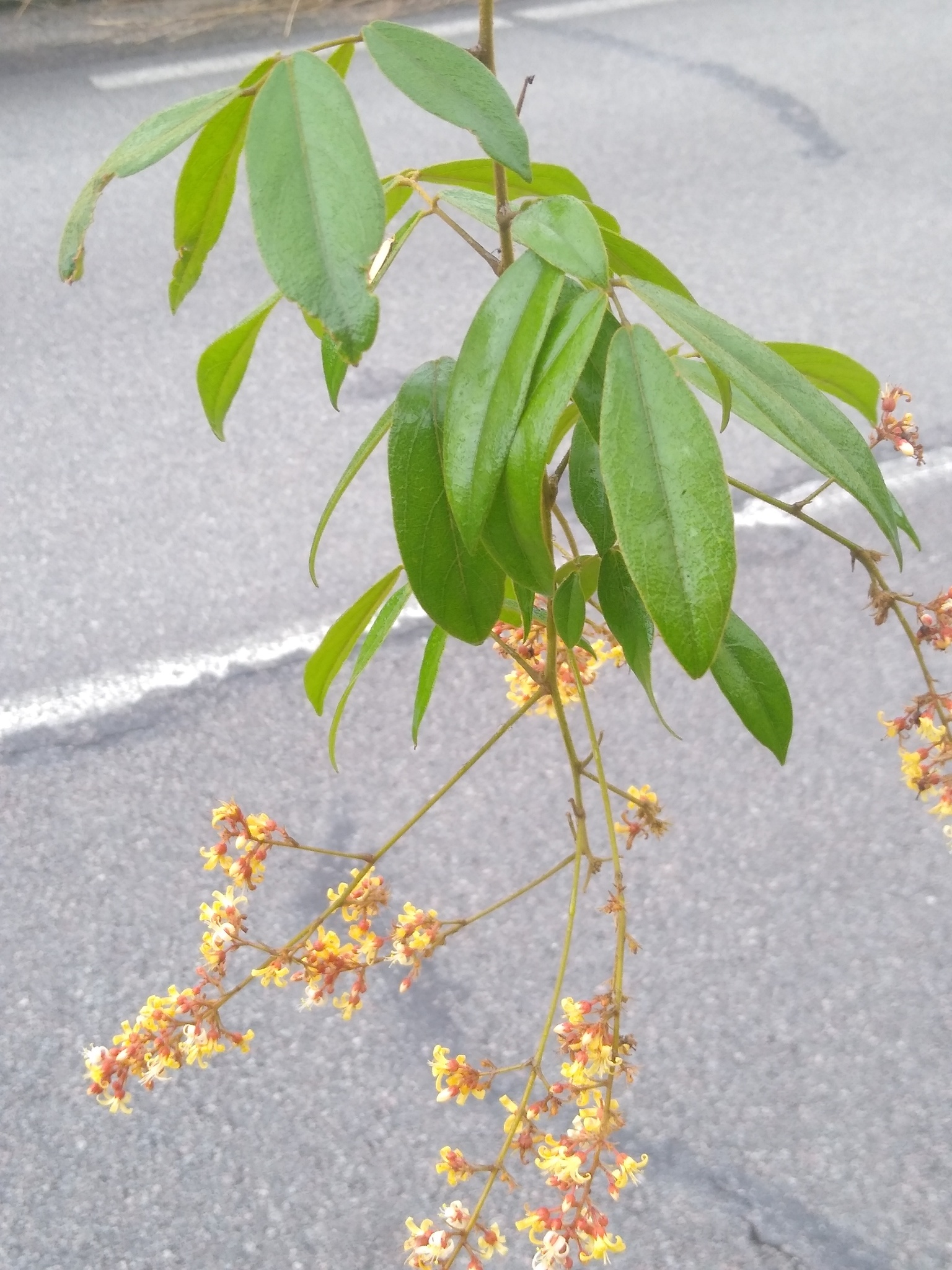
- Manotes griffoniana in Gabon

Scientific classification
- Kingdom: Plantae
- Clade: Tracheophytes
- Clade: Angiosperms
- Clade: Eudicots
- Clade: Rosids
- Order: Oxalidales
- Family: Connaraceae
- Genus: Manotes; Sol. ex Planch.

= Manotes (plant) =

Genus of plants

Manotes is a genus of flowering plants belonging to the family Connaraceae.

Its native range is Western Tropical Africa to Angola.

== Species ==
Species:

- Manotes expansa Sol. ex Planch.
- Manotes griffoniana Baill.
- Manotes lomamiensis Troupin
- Manotes macrantha (Gilg) G.Schellenb.
- Manotes soyauxii G.Schellenb.
