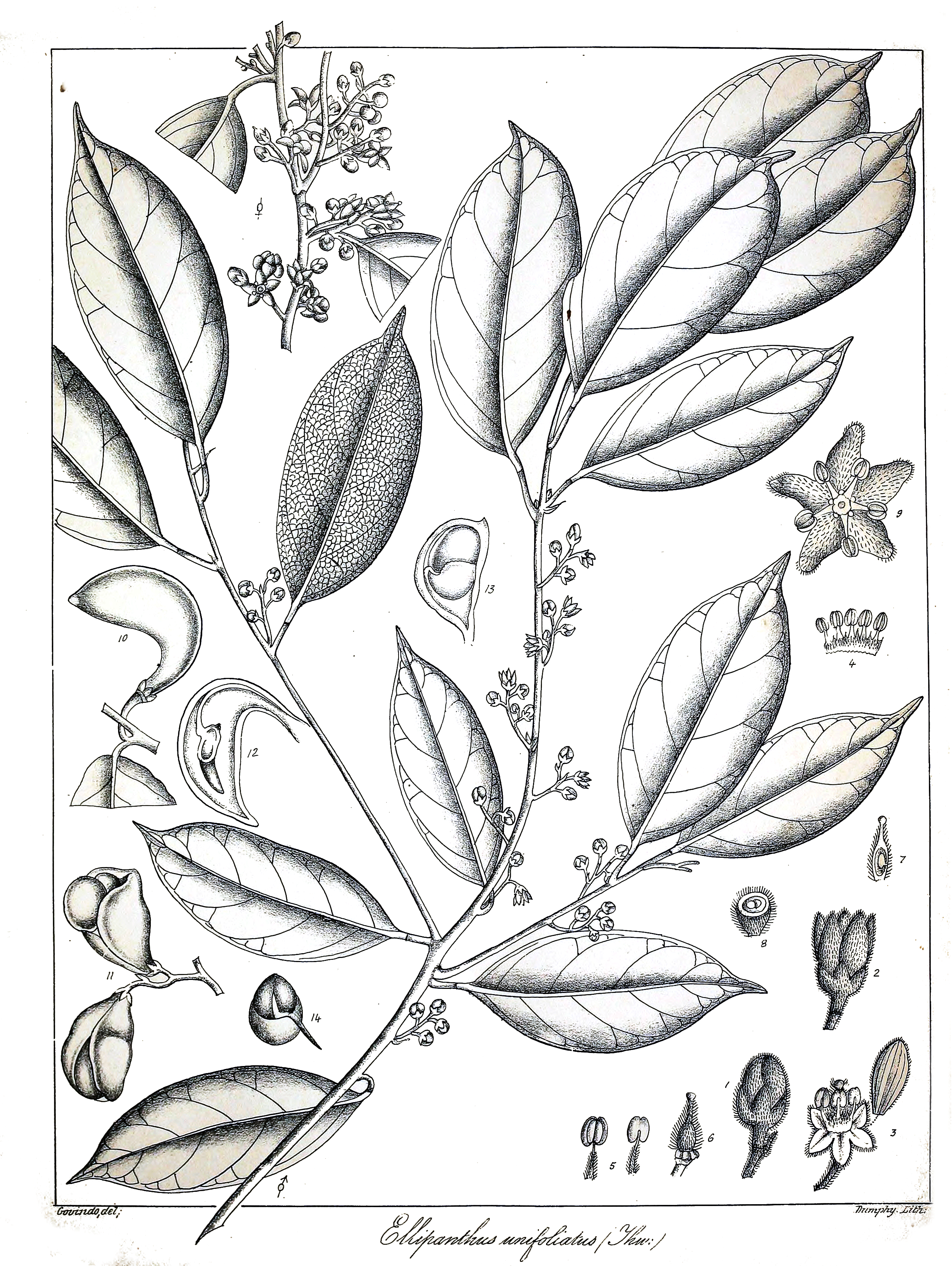
- Ellipanthus unifoliatus

Scientific classification
- Kingdom: Plantae
- Clade: Tracheophytes
- Clade: Angiosperms
- Clade: Eudicots
- Clade: Rosids
- Order: Oxalidales
- Family: Connaraceae
- Genus: Ellipanthus; Hook.f.

Species
- See text

= Ellipanthus =

Genus of flowering plants

Ellipanthus is a genus of plants in the family Connaraceae. The generic name is from the Greek meaning "defective flower", referring to the incomplete development of some of the stamens.

== Description ==
Ellipanthus species grow as shrubs or small trees. The twigs are tomentose, especially when young. Inflorescences consist of four or five flowers. The fruits are densely tomentose with a woody pericarp.

== Distribution and habitat ==
Ellipanthus species grow naturally in Africa, Madagascar, Sri Lanka, mainland Southeast Asia and Malesia. Their habitat is lowland mixed dipterocarp forest and mixed swamp forest.

== Species ==
As of May 2014 The Plant List recognises 10 accepted taxa (of species and infraspecific names):

- Ellipanthus beccarii Pierre
- Ellipanthus calophyllus Kurz
- Ellipanthus glabrifolius Merr.
- Ellipanthus hemandradenioides Brenan
- Ellipanthus madagascariensis (Schellenb.) Capuron ex Keraudren
- Ellipanthus razanatsimae Randrian. & Lowry
- Ellipanthus tomentosus Kurz
  - var. kingii (Boerl. & Koord.) Leenh.
- Ellipanthus unifoliatus (Thwaites) Thwaites
- Ellipanthus unifoliolatus (Thwaites Thwaites) Thwaites
