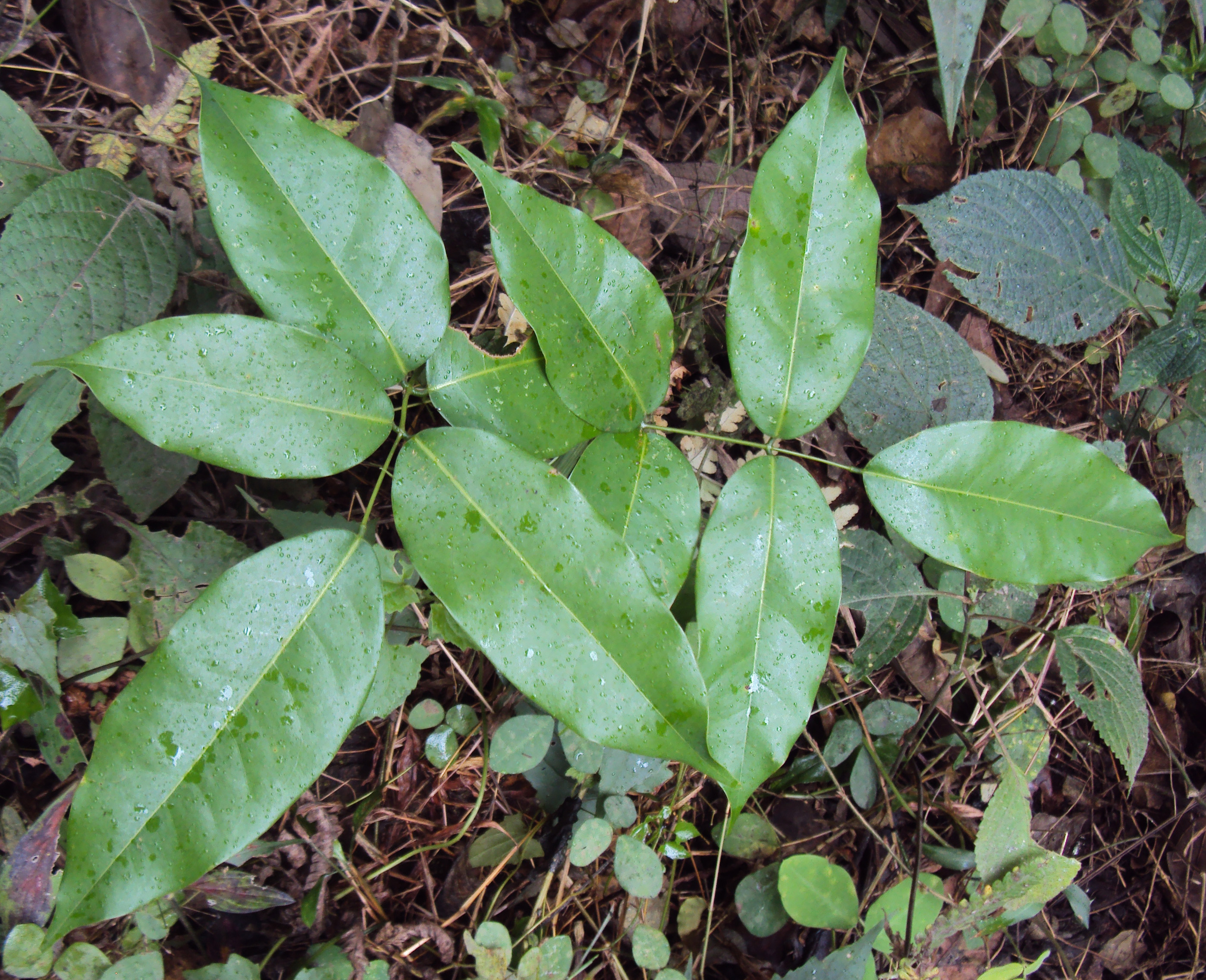

Scientific classification
- Kingdom: Plantae
- Clade: Tracheophytes
- Clade: Angiosperms
- Clade: Eudicots
- Clade: Rosids
- Order: Oxalidales
- Family: Connaraceae
- Genus: Rourea
- Species: R. minor

Binomial name
- Rourea minor (Gaertn.) Alston

= Rourea minor =

Species of shrub

Rourea minor is a large scandent shrub from the family Connaraceae. It has been recorded from Africa, tropical Asia and the Pacific.
