= Turczaninovia =

Scientific classification
- Kingdom: Plantae
- Clade: Embryophytes
- Clade: Tracheophytes
- Clade: Angiosperms
- Clade: Eudicots
- Clade: Asterids
- Order: Asterales
- Family: Asteraceae
- Subfamily: Asteroideae
- Tribe: Astereae
- Subtribe: Asterinae
- Genus: Turczaninovia; DC.
- Species: T. fastigiata

Binomial name
- Turczaninovia fastigiata (Fisch.) DC.

Genus of flowering plants

Turczaninovia is a monotypic genus of flowering plants belonging to the family Asteraceae. It only contains one known species, Turczaninovia fastigiata.

Its native range stretches from south-eastern Siberia (within the Russian province of Chita Oblast), Far Eastern Federal District (within the provinces of Amur Oblast, Khabarovsk Krai and Primorsky Krai), to China (including Inner Mongolia and Manchuria), Mongolia, Korea, and Japan.

The genus name of Turczaninovia is in honour of Nikolai Turczaninow (1796–1863), a Russian botanist and plant collector who first identified several genera, and many species of plants. The Latin specific epithet of fastigiata means pointed derived from fastigiate. It was first described and published in Prodr. Vol.5 on page 257 in 1836.
