= Quadracaea stauroconidia =

Scientific classification
- Kingdom: Fungi
- Division: Ascomycota
- Class: incertae sedis
- Order: incertae sedis
- Family: incertae sedis
- Genus: Quadracaea
- Species: Q. stauroconidia

Binomial name
- Quadracaea stauroconidia F.R.Barbosa & Gusmão (2013)

Species of lichen

Quadracaea stauroconidia is a species of fungus in the division Ascomycota. This hyphomycetes fungus was formally described as a new species in 2013. The type specimen was collected by the authors from Serra da Jibóiapt, (Santa Teresinha, Bahia, Brazil), where it was found growing on submerged leaves. The species epithet, stauroconidia, makes reference to the star-shaped conidia (asexual spores).

== Description ==
Quadracaea stauroconidia shares similarities with several related fungal species but can be distinguished by specific characteristics of its reproductive structures. The conidiophores of Q. stauroconidia are unbranched, septate, and erect, ranging in colour from brown at the base to paler towards the apex. These structures measure 84–225 μm in length and 3–9 μm in width.

The conidiogenous cells, which produce the spores, are terminal or intercalary and cylindrical in shape, measuring 12–16.5 μm by 3–3.8 μm. These cells are light brown and can sometimes show percurrent proliferation. The separating cells are single or in clusters of up to five, thin-walled, smooth, and pale brown, with dimensions of 3–6 μm by 3 μm.

The conidia (asexual spores) are solitary, dry, septate, and constricted at the septa. They are smooth, thin-walled, and stauroform (cross-shaped). The central cell is angular and dark brown, measuring 8.5–13 μm by 7.5–11 μm. The apical cells are conical and pale brown, with the first cell measuring 4–5 μm by 6 μm, and the second cell phialidic, measuring 4–5 μm by 3–4.5 μm. There are usually two, sometimes one, lateral cells that are conical and rounded at the top, pale brown, measuring 4–5 μm by 4–6 μm. These lateral cells may sometimes have a middle septum forming a phialidic cell. The basal cell is conical, truncated at the base with a short frill, pale brown, and measures 4–5 μm by 5–6 μm. The phialidic cells produce smooth, falcate, hyaline conidia that lack septa and measure 7.5–9 μm by 0.7–0.9 μm.
