= Hemandradenia =

Scientific classification
- Kingdom: Plantae
- Clade: Tracheophytes
- Clade: Angiosperms
- Clade: Eudicots
- Clade: Rosids
- Order: Oxalidales
- Family: Connaraceae
- Genus: Hemandradenia; Stapf

Genus of flowering plants

Hemandradenia is a genus of plant in family Connaraceae. It contains the following species (but this list may be incomplete):

- Hemandradenia chevalieri, Stapf
- Hemandradenia mannii, Stapf
