= Burttia prunoides =

Scientific classification
- Kingdom: Plantae
- Clade: Tracheophytes
- Clade: Angiosperms
- Clade: Eudicots
- Clade: Rosids
- Order: Oxalidales
- Family: Connaraceae
- Genus: Burttia; Baker f. & Exell
- Species: B. prunoides

Binomial name
- Burttia prunoides Baker f. & Exell

Species of flowering plant

Burttia is a genus of flowering plants belonging to the family Connaraceae. The only species is Burttia prunoides.

Its native range is Tanzania to Zambia.
