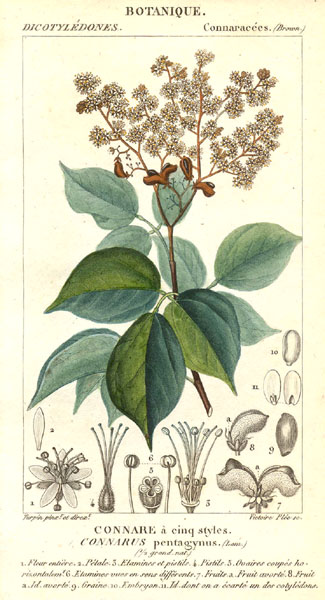
- Agelaea lamarckii

Scientific classification
- Kingdom: Plantae
- Clade: Tracheophytes
- Clade: Angiosperms
- Clade: Eudicots
- Clade: Rosids
- Order: Oxalidales
- Family: Connaraceae
- Genus: Agelaea; Sol. ex Planch.

Species
- See text

= Agelaea (plant) =

Genus of flowering plants

Agelaea is a genus of plants in the family Connaraceae.

== Lists of species ==
According to The Plant List (note: only species listed as 'Accepted'):

- Agelaea annobonensis – Agelaea baronii – Agelaea borneensis – Agelaea claessensii – Agelaea coccinea – Agelaea conraui – Agelaea gabonensis – Agelaea insignis – Agelaea macrophylla – Agelaea palmata – Agelaea paradoxa – Agelaea pentagyna – Agelaea poggeana – Agelaea rubiginosa – Agelaea trinervis

According to Tropicos (note: list containing potentially synonyms):

- Agelaea agamae – Agelaea annobonensis – Agelaea australis – Agelaea baronii – Agelaea borneensis – Agelaea brevipaniculata – Agelaea cambodiana – Agelaea claessensii – Agelaea coccinea – Agelaea conraui – Agelaea cordata – Agelaea demeusei – Agelaea dewevrei – Agelaea duchesnei – Agelaea elegans – Agelaea emetica – Agelaea everetii – Agelaea everettii – Agelaea ferruginea – Agelaea ferruginosa – Agelaea floccosa – Agelaea fragrans – Agelaea gabonensis – Agelaea glabrifolia – Agelaea glandulosissima – Agelaea gracilis – Agelaea grisea – Agelaea heterophylla – Agelaea hirsuta – Agelaea hullettii – Agelaea insignis – Agelaea katangensis – Agelaea kivuensis – Agelaea koneri – Agelaea lamarckii – Agelaea laurentii – Agelaea leopoldvilleana – Agelaea lescrauwaetii – Agelaea longecalyculata – Agelaea longifoliata – Agelaea lucida – Agelaea macrocarpa – Agelaea macrophylla – Agelaea macrophysa – Agelaea marginata – Agelaea mayottensis – Agelaea mildbraedii – Agelaea neglecta – Agelaea nitida – Agelaea obliqua – Agelaea obovata – Agelaea oligantha – Agelaea ovalis – Agelaea palmata – Agelaea paradoxa – Agelaea pentagyna – Agelaea phaeocarpa – Agelaea phaseolifolia – Agelaea pilosa – Agelaea pinnata – Agelaea platyphylla – Agelaea poggeana – Agelaea preussii – Agelaea principensis – Agelaea pruriens – Agelaea pseudobliqua – Agelaea punctulata – Agelaea puncutulata – Agelaea pynaertii – Agelaea reticulata – Agelaea rubiginosa – Agelaea schweinfurthii – Agelaea setulosa – Agelaea sublanata – Agelaea tenuinervis – Agelaea thouarsiana – Agelaea tricuspidata – Agelaea trifolia – Agelaea trinervis – Agelaea ugandensis – Agelaea usambarensis – Agelaea ustulata – Agelaea vanderystii – Agelaea vestita – Agelaea villosa – Agelaea villosiflora – Agelaea wallichii – Agelaea zenkeri
