= Gustav Schellenberg =

German botanist and publisher (1882–1963)

Gustav August Ludwig David Schellenberg (28 September 1882 – 4 June 1963) was a German botanist and newspaper publisher. He was born and died in Wiesbaden.

Schellenberg worked in Zurich, Berlin, Kiel and Göttingen, lecturing in Kiel and Göttingen from 1925 to 1934. One of his specialties was the plant family Connaraceae. Schellenberg's family had owned the weekly Wiesbadener Tagblatt newspaper since its founding in the 1840s, and in 1949 Schellenberg restarted the newspaper and served as its publisher.

The plant species Aizoon schellenbergii and the plant genus Schellenbergia are named for Schellenberg.

== Selected works ==
- Gustav Schellenberg, Hans Schinz, and Albert Thellung (1913). "Beiträge zur Kenntniss der Flora von Kolumbien und Westindien. Neuchatel, 1913.
- Wilhelm Brandt, Max Gurke, and Gustav Schellenberg. Köhler's Medizinal-Pflanzen in Naturgetreuen Abbildungen Mit Kurz Erläuterndem Texte.
- Das Pflanzenreich (Vol 103): Connaraceae. W. Engelmann, 1938.
- "Die bis jetzt aus Neu-Guinea bekannt gewordenen Opiliaceae, Oleaceae, und Icacinaceae." [The Opiliaceae, Oleaceae, and Icacinaceae so far known from New Guinea.] Bot.Jahrb. 58: 155–177. 1923.
- "Die Connaraceen Papuasiens". [The Connaraceae of Papuasia]. Bot. Jahrb. 58: 178–181. 1923.
