= Agelaea (beetle) =

- Agelaea fulva

Scientific classification
- Kingdom: Animalia
- Phylum: Arthropoda
- Clade: Pancrustacea
- Class: Insecta
- Order: Coleoptera
- Suborder: Adephaga
- Family: Carabidae
- Subfamily: Platyninae
- Tribe: Platynini
- Subtribe: Platynina
- Genus: Agelaea; Gené, 1839

Genus of beetles

Agelaea is a genus of beetles in the family Carabidae.

== Species ==
These two species belong to the genus Agelaea:

- Agelaea fulva Gené, 1839 (Italy)
- Agelaea himalayica Jedlicka, 1965 (Nepal)
