= Nikolai Turczaninow =

Botanist (1796–1863)

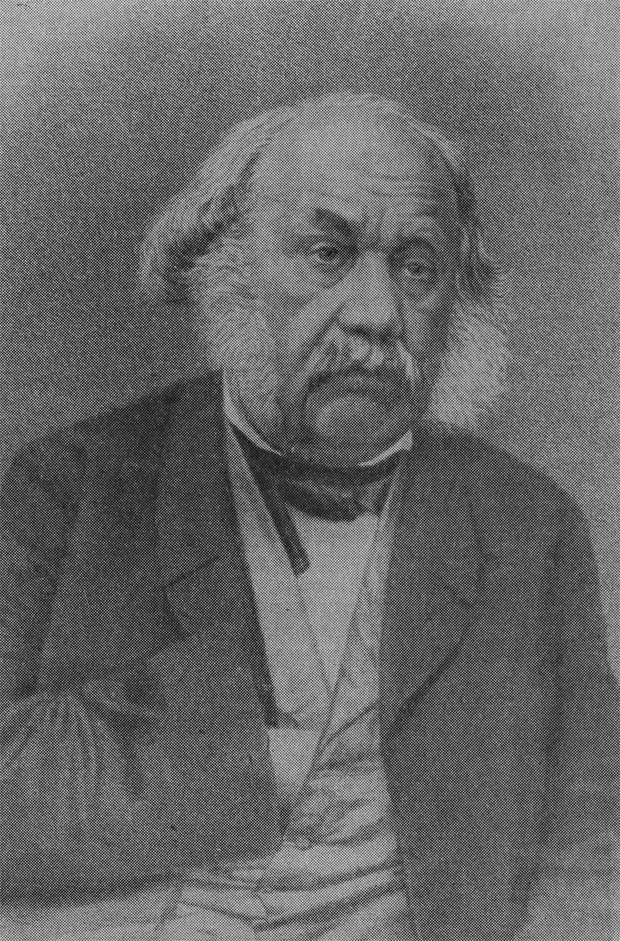
- Nikolai Turczaninow
- Pronunciation: Russian pronunciation: [tʊrt͡ɕɐˈnʲinəf]
- Born: May 1796; Nikitovka, Voronezh Viceroyalty, Russian Empire (now Krasnogvardeysky District, Belgorod Oblast, Russia)
- Died: 7 January 1864 (aged 67); Kharkov, Russian Empire (now Kharkiv, Ukraine)
- Education: Kharkov University
- Scientific career
- Fields: Botany
- Author abbrev. (botany): Turcz.

Nikolai Stepanovich Turchaninov, traditionally spelled Turczaninow (Russian: Николай Степанович Турчанинов; 1796 – 7 January 1864 [O.S. 26 December 1863]) was a Russian botanist and plant collector who first identified several genera and many species of plants. The standard author abbreviation Turcz. is used to indicate this person as the author when citing a botanical name; he has named almost 2500 plant species.

== Education and career ==
Born in 1796, Turczaninow attended high school in Kharkov. In 1814, he graduated from Kharkov University, before working as a civil servant for the Ministry of Finance in St. Petersburg. Soon after, in 1825, Turczaninow published his first botanical list. Despite being employed in a different field, he continued his largely self-taught botanical work.

In 1828, he was assigned an administrative post in Irkutsk, Siberia. This allowed him to collect in the Lake Baikal area, which is known for its rich biodiversity. A spate of papers followed, and Turczaninow established his own herbarium containing plants from the region. In 1830, he was appointed a Fellow of the Imperial Botanic Garden St. Petersburg (now the Saint Petersburg Botanical Garden), and charged with collecting plants from Siberia. In the early 1830s, Turczaninow published numerous papers on the botany of Siberia and Mongolia, most of which appeared in the Bulletin de la Société impériale des naturalistes de Moscou.

During his career, Turczaninow corresponded and exchanged specimens with eminent botanists of the era, including Augustin Pyramus de Candolle, George Bentham, Joseph Dalton Hooker, and Joachim Steetz, among others.

In 1837, he was sent to Krasnoyarsk where he continued to publish botanical names. He also became governor of the region.

Turczaninow later opened a herbarium in Taganrog on the Sea of Azov. After a debilitating fall, he allowed others to collect for him and he spent his time in classification, study and writing. In particular, Turczaninow began work on collections sent to him from the Swan River Colony in Western Australia by botanist James Drummond. Despite never visiting the country, he published over 400 species of Australian flora.

Turczaninow eventually moved back to Kharkov in 1847, taking most of his herbarium with him. Many of these specimens, including known type specimens, were transferred to the National Herbarium of Ukraine (KW). Many herbaria around the world also hold collections made by Turczaninow, including the Komarov Botanical Institute, the National Herbarium of Victoria at the Royal Botanic Gardens, Melbourne, Harvard University Herbaria and the herbarium at the Royal Botanic Gardens, Kew.

== Prizes ==
- 1857: Demidov Prize of the Russian Academy of Sciences

== List of selected publications ==
- "Enumeratio plantarum phaenogamarum et filicum Florae Baikalensis, cura Turtschaninof". Flora oder Botanische Zeitung: Welche Recensionen, Abhandlungen, Aufsätze, Neuigkeiten und Nachrichten, die Botanik betreffend, enthält. 17 (1): 4–28. 1834.

== Legacy ==
- The open access journal Turczaninowia, which publishes on systematics and phylogeny of plants, study of plant diversity, florogenesis, anatomy and morphology of plants, is named after him.
- Several plant species have been named after him, including Connarus turczaninowii, Hydrocotyle turczaninowii, and Sisymbrium turczaninowii. Also in 1836, Augustin-Pyramus de Candolle published Turczaninovia, which is a monotypic genus of flowering plants from Russia to China, belonging to the family Asteraceae. It was named in Nikolai Turczaninow's honour.

== See also ==
- Category:Taxa named by Nikolai Turczaninow
- Saposhnikovia
- Marchant, N. G. (1988) "The contribution of the Russian botanist Turczaninov to Australian plant taxonomy" in Short, P.S. (ed.) (1990) History of Systematic Botany in Australasia: Proceedings of a Symposium Held at the University of Melbourne, 25–27 May 1988 Australian Systematic Botany Society, Melbourne, pp. 121–130, ISBN 0-7316-8463-X
