= Hans Conrad Schellenberg =

Swiss botanist and university teacher (1872–1923)

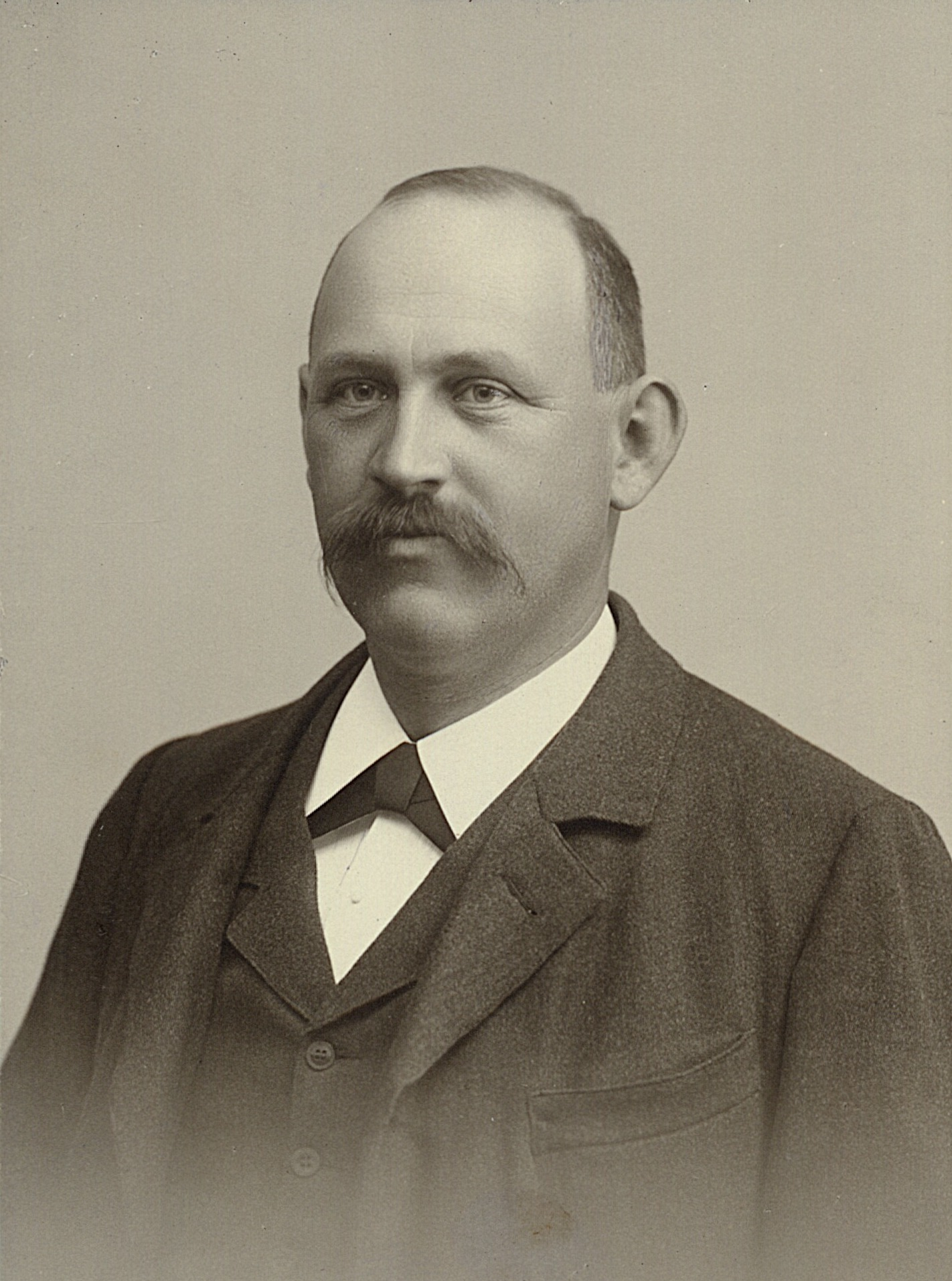
- Schellenberg c. 1921
- Born: 28 April 1872; Hottingen, Switzerland
- Died: 27 October 1923 (aged 51); Zurich, Switzerland
- Education: Eidgenössisches Polytechnikum Zürich (1890–93); University of Berlin (1893–95)
- Spouse: Alice Rosa Bär
- Scientific career
- Fields: botany, agronomy
- Author abbrev. (botany): Schellenb.

Hans Conrad Schellenberg (28 April 1872 – 27 October 1923) was a Swiss botanist and agronomist.

Schellenberg was born in Hottingen. He studied at the Eidgenössisches Polytechnikum Zürich (1890–93) and the University of Berlin (1893–95), where he was a student of botanist Simon Schwendener. Afterwards he worked as an assistant at the seed control station in Zürich (1895–97) and as a teacher at the Agricultural School-Strickhof in Oberstrass (1897–1902). He obtained his habilitation for botany at the Polytechnic in Zürich, where from 1908 to 1923, he served as a professor of agronomy.

His primary focus was in the areas of plant pathology and agricultural botany, being credited with furthering the development of grain farming in Switzerland. He was the author of significant works on fungal plant diseases. He died in Zürich, aged 51.

== Selected works ==
- Beiträge zur Kenntnis der verholzten Zellmembran, 1895 (dissertation thesis).
- Graubündens Getreidevarietäten : mit besonderer Rücksicht auf ihre horizontale Verbreitung, 1900 – Graubünden cereal varieties.
- Der Blasenrost der Arve, 1904 – Blister rust and the Swiss pine.
- Untersuchungen über den Einfluss der Salze auf die Wachstumsrichtung der Wurzeln, zunächst. an der Erbsenwurzel, 1906 – Studies on the influence of salts on growth direction of roots, etc.
- Die Brandpilze der Schweiz 1911 – Smut fungi of Switzerland.

== See also ==
- Agriculture in Switzerland
