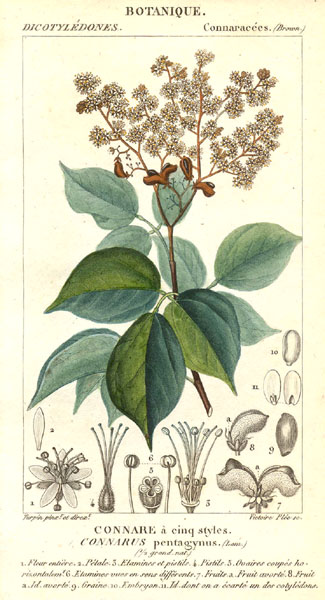
- Agelaea lamarckii

Scientific classification
- Kingdom: Plantae
- Clade: Tracheophytes
- Clade: Angiosperms
- Clade: Eudicots
- Clade: Rosids
- Order: Oxalidales
- Family: Connaraceae; R.Br.

= Connaraceae =

Family of flowering plants

Connaraceae is a pan-tropical plant family of 12 genera and more than 180 species of largely evergreen trees, woody shrubs and climbers.

The family was first described by Robert Brown in 1816 and the name has been conserved.

== Distribution ==
Connaraceae is a tropical family, the most important genera of which, Connarus (approximately 80 species) and Rourea (40-70 species) have a pan-tropical distribution. Their habitat is generally lowland tropical rain forest and savanna.

== Description ==
Connaraceae are typically evergreen trees, shrubs or climbers. Connarus is represented by species in all three lifeforms, while Rourea species are climbers. Their leaves are pinnate, trifoliate or rarely entire, alternate, without stipules and with a pulvinus at the base of the petiole.

Connarus guianensis is economically important for its decorative wood, zebra wood.

== Genera ==
As of 2026, Plants of the World Online accepts these genera:

- Agelaea Sol. ex Planch.
- Burttia Baker f. & Exell
- Cnestidium Planch.
- Cnestis Juss.
- Connarus L.
- Ellipanthus Hook.f.
- Hemandradenia Stapf
- Jollydora Pierre ex Gilg
- Manotes Sol. ex Planch.
- Pseudoconnarus Radlk.
- Rourea Aubl.
- Vismianthus Mildbr.

== Fossil record ==
Fossil leaflet impression described as Rourea miocaudata from India shows close resemblance to leaflets of the extant Rourea caudata, it has been recorded from the lower part of the Siwalik sediments (Dafla Formation, middle–upper Miocene) of Pinjoli area in West Kameng district, Arunachal Pradesh. Permineralized wood of a stem with the distinctive anatomy of a liana has been described with fossil fruits from a locality in the lower Miocene (19 mya) Cucaracha Formation, where the formation is exposed by the Culebra Cut of the Panama Canal. The anatomy of this fossil wood matches the genus Rourea. Fossil record of Connaraceae is sparse, reliable occurrences indicate that the family originated as early as the late Cretaceous-Paleocene and was widespread by the early Miocene.
