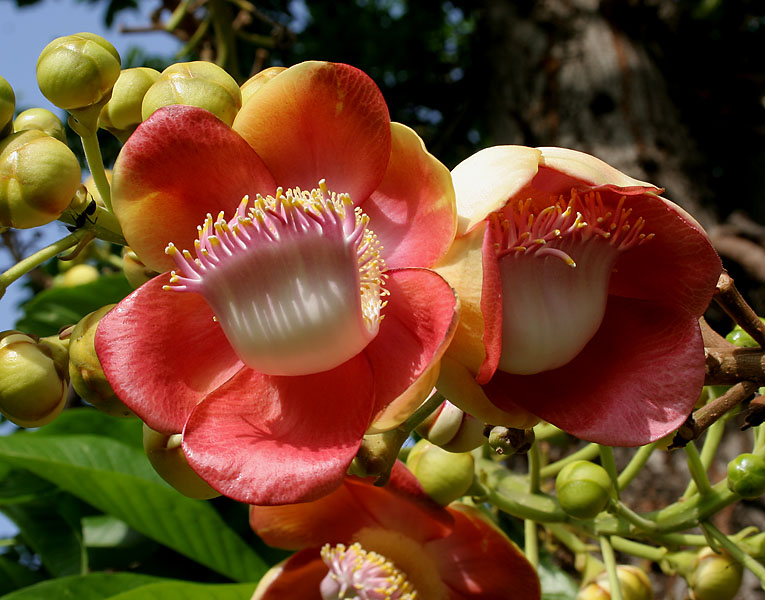
- Couroupita guianensis

Scientific classification
- Kingdom: Plantae
- Clade: Tracheophytes
- Clade: Angiosperms
- Clade: Eudicots
- Clade: Asterids
- Order: Ericales
- Family: Lecythidaceae
- Subfamily: Lecythidoideae
- Genus: Couroupita; Aubl.

Synonyms
- Pontopidana Scop.; Pekea Juss. 1789, illegitimate homonym, not Aubl. 1775. (syn of Caryocar in Caryocaraceae); Elsholtzia Neck. 1790 illegitimate homonym, not Willd. 1790 (Lamiaceae)

= Couroupita =

Genus of flowering plants

Couroupita is a genus of flowering plants in the family Lecythidaceae first described as a genus in 1775. It is native to tropical South America and Central America.

Species

1. Couroupita guianensis - Cannonball tree -Guyana, Colombia, Ecuador east to Amapá and south to Bolivia; naturalized in the West Indies as well as in Bangladesh, Sri Lanka and Andaman & Nicobar
2. Couroupita nicaraguarensis – Bala de cañón, coco de mono, paraíso, zapote de mico, or zapote de mono -Nicaragua, Costa Rica, Honduras, Panama
3. Couroupita subsessilis - northern Brazil, northern Peru
