= C. costaricense =

C. costaricense can refer to a few different species. The specific epithet costaricense refers to the country of Costa Rica where many of these species may be found.

- Camaridium costaricense, a plant in the family Orchidaceae
- Capsicum costaricense, a plant in the family Solanaceae
- Caryocar costaricense, a plant in the family Caryocaraceae
- Catacauma costaricense, a sac fungus in the family Phyllachoraceae
- Centropetalum costaricense, a plant in the family Orchidaceae
- Cestrum costaricense, a plant in the family Solanaceae
- Characithecium costaricense, a worm in the family Ancyrocephalidae
- Ciliciopodium costaricense, a fungus in the family Nectriaceae
- Cirsium costaricense, a synonym for Cirsium mexicanum and known as Mexican thistle
- Citharexylum costaricense, a plant in the family Verbenaceae
- Cladobium costaricense, a plant in the family Orchidaceae
- Clerodendrum costaricense, a plant in the family Lamiaceae
- Colletotrichum costaricense, a fungus in the family Glomerellaceae
- Crassolabium costaricense, a worm in the family Qudsianematidae
- Cryptocentrum costaricense, a plant in the family Orchidaceae
- Cymbopetalum costaricense, a tree in the family Annonaceae sometimes used as a spice
