= C. glabrum =

C. glabrum may refer to:

- Caryocar glabrum, a flowering plant species
- Ceriagrion glabrum, a damselfly species found in Africa
- Clerodendrum glabrum, a small to medium deciduous tree species widespread from Tropical to Southern Africa
