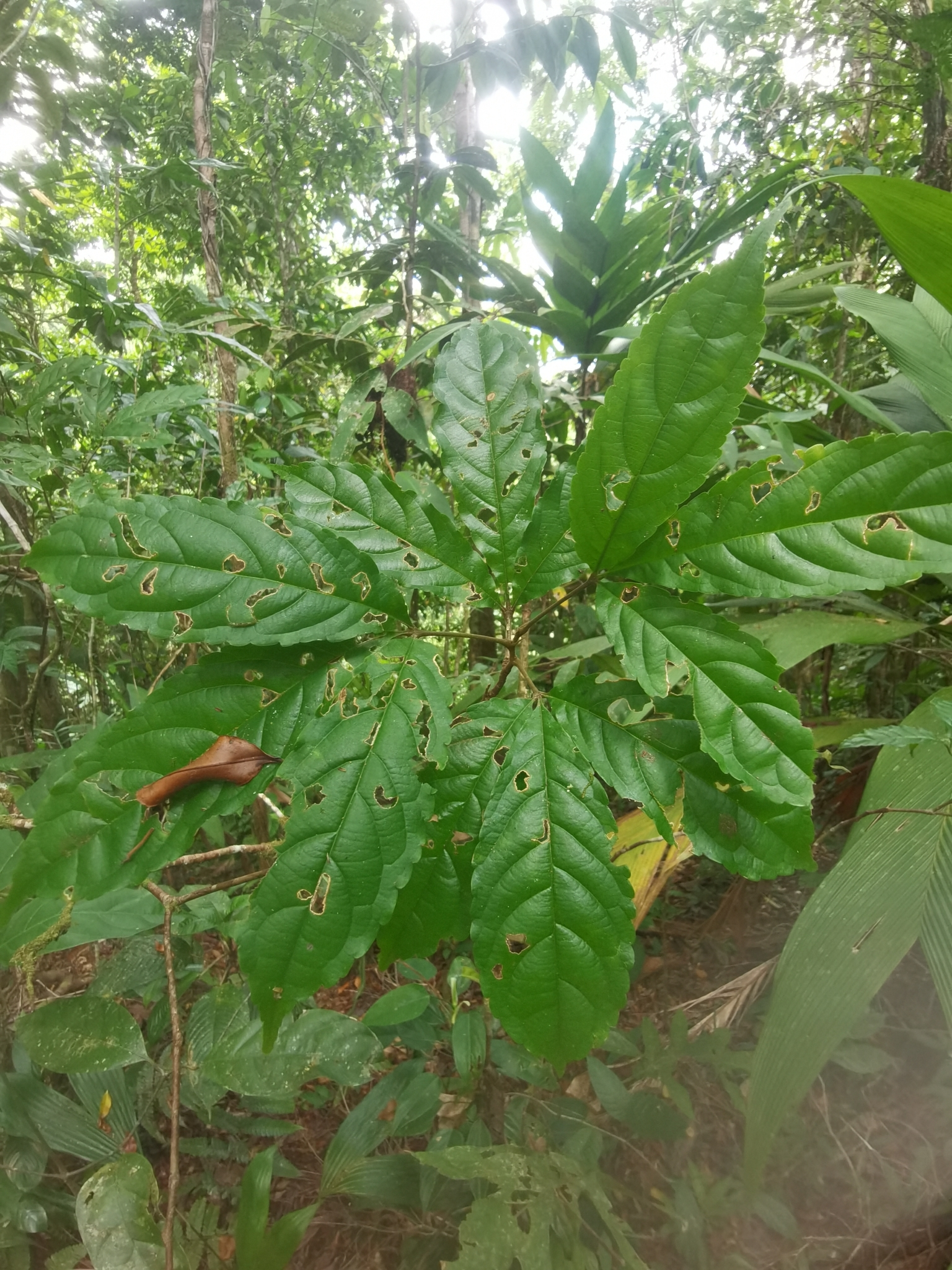
- In Costa Rica

Conservation status
- Endangered (IUCN 3.1)

Scientific classification
- Kingdom: Plantae
- Clade: Tracheophytes
- Clade: Angiosperms
- Clade: Eudicots
- Clade: Rosids
- Order: Malpighiales
- Family: Caryocaraceae
- Genus: Anthodiscus
- Species: A. chocoensis

Binomial name
- Anthodiscus chocoensis Prance

= Anthodiscus chocoensis =

Species of flowering plant

Anthodiscus chocoensis is a species of plant in the family Caryocaraceae family. It is an endangered species native to Colombia, Costa Rica, and Panama. It is threatened by habitat loss.

== Distribution and habitat ==
Anthodiscus chocoensis has a fragmented distribution across its range, which includes the Chocó and Valle del Cauca departments in Colombia, the Donoso District in Panama, and the south-western coast of Costa Rica (particularly on the Osa Peninsula and the area surrounding the Golfo Dulce). It primarily occurs in lowland tropical rainforests below 500 m (1,600 ft) above sea level, but may be found as high as 1,204 m (3,950 ft) above sea level. It is most common on hilly or otherwise irregular terrain.

== Description ==
Anthodiscus chocoensis is a tree growing to 40 m (130 ft) tall. The leaves are trifoliate with elliptic leaflets that are almost entirely hairless. The central leaflet is the largest, measuring 12–15 cm (4.7–5.9 in) long and 6–7 cm (2.4–2.8 in) wide, with the other leaflets somewhat smaller. The inflorescence is an elongate raceme with a sparsely hairy rachis measuring 5–6 cm (2.0–2.4 in) long. The flowers have yellow petals, approximately 150 3–5 mm (0.12–0.20 in) long stamens with small anthers, and approximately 32 1.5 mm (0.059 in) long styles. The fruit is a flattened brown and green drupe that measures 1 cm (0.39 in) long and 1.8–2 cm (0.71–0.79 in) wide.

== Conservation status ==
Anthodiscus chocoensis is listed as endangered by the International Union for the Conservation of Nature under criteria B2ab(i,ii,iv,v), based on its fragmented distribution and low population density. This species is harvested for its timber, which is used locally and regionally for construction. Though it does occur in some protected areas, including Corcovado National Park and the Golfo Dulce Forest Reserve in Costa Rica, illegal logging remains an issue.
