= Caryocar amygdaliforme =

Conservation status
- Least Concern (IUCN 3.1)

Scientific classification
- Kingdom: Plantae
- Clade: Tracheophytes
- Clade: Angiosperms
- Clade: Eudicots
- Clade: Rosids
- Order: Malpighiales
- Family: Caryocaraceae
- Genus: Caryocar
- Species: C. amygdaliforme

Binomial name
- Caryocar amygdaliforme G.Don

Species of tree

Caryocar amygdaliforme is a species of tree in the Caryocaraceae family. It is a tree native to Ecuador and northern Peru, where it grows in lowland Amazon rainforest from 100 to 800 meters elevation.
