= Anthodiscus montanus =

Conservation status
- Vulnerable (IUCN 3.1)

Scientific classification
- Kingdom: Plantae
- Clade: Tracheophytes
- Clade: Angiosperms
- Clade: Eudicots
- Clade: Rosids
- Order: Malpighiales
- Family: Caryocaraceae
- Genus: Anthodiscus
- Species: A. montanus

Binomial name
- Anthodiscus montanus Gleason

Species of flowering plant

Anthodiscus montanus is a species of plant in the Caryocaraceae family. It is endemic to Colombia.
