= Staminode =

Modified or abortive stamen in flowering plants

In botany, a staminode is an often rudimentary, sterile or abortive stamen, which means that it does not produce pollen. Staminodes are frequently inconspicuous and stamen-like, usually occurring at the inner whorl of the flower, but are also sometimes long enough to protrude from the corolla.

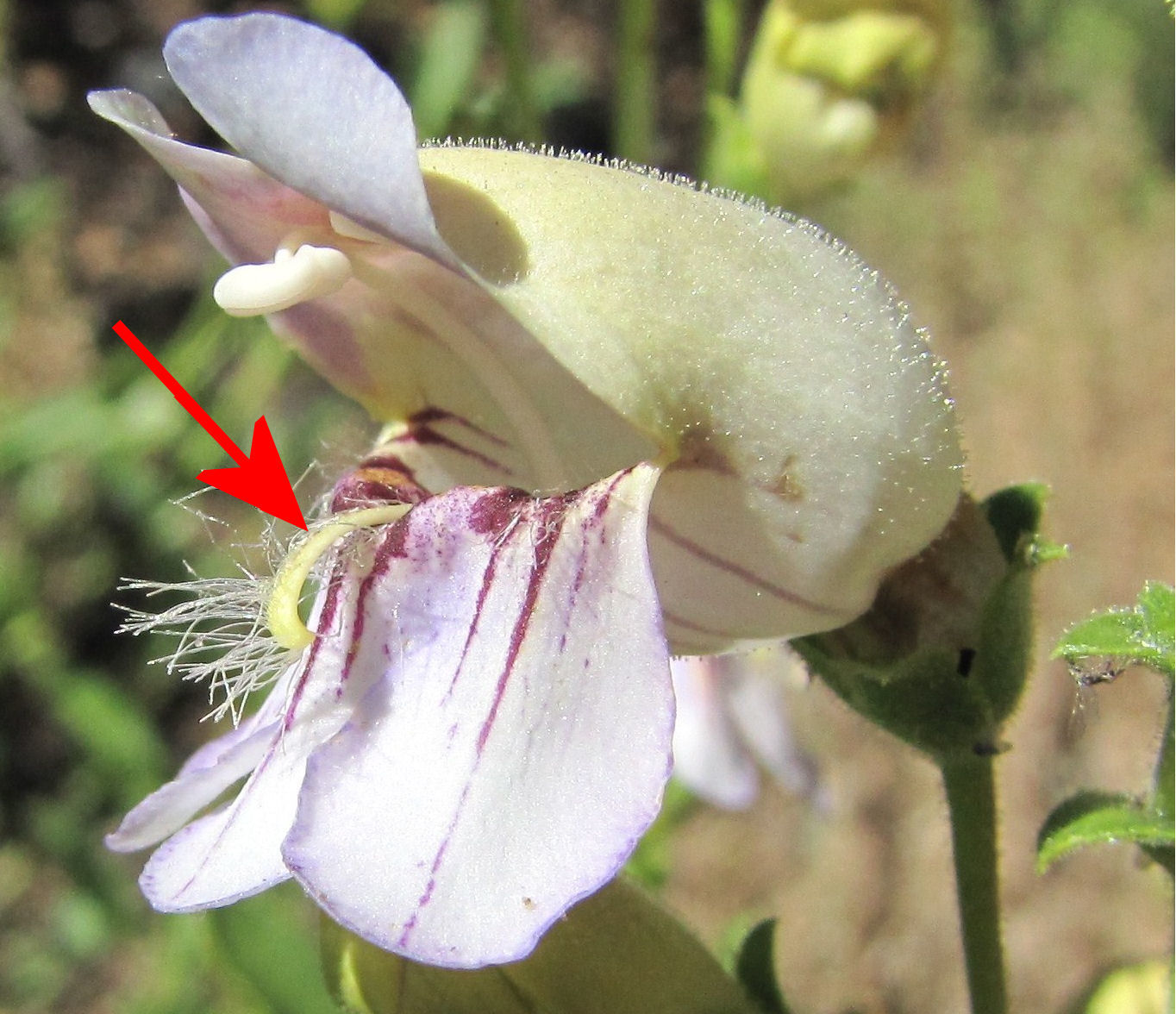
The arrow points to the hairy staminode of a Grinnell's penstemon (Penstemon grinnellii) flower

Sometimes, the staminodes are modified to produce nectar, as in the witch-hazel (Hamamelis).

Staminodes can be a critical characteristic for differentiating between species, for instance in the orchid genus Paphiopedilum, and among the penstemons.

In the case of cannas, the petals are inconsequential and the staminodes are refined into eye-catching petal-like replacements.

A spectacular example of staminode is given by Couroupita guianensis, a tropical tree growing in South America also known as the cannonball tree.
