= Caryocar coriaceum =

Conservation status
- Endangered (IUCN 2.3)

Scientific classification
- Kingdom: Plantae
- Clade: Tracheophytes
- Clade: Angiosperms
- Clade: Eudicots
- Clade: Rosids
- Order: Malpighiales
- Family: Caryocaraceae
- Genus: Caryocar
- Species: C. coriaceum

Binomial name
- Caryocar coriaceum Wittm.

Species of flowering plant

Caryocar coriaceum is a species of plant in the Caryocaraceae family. It is a tree endemic to central and northeastern Brazil, including the Chapada do Araripe. It grows in Cerrado savanna.

The species was first described by Ludwig Wittmack in 1886.
