= Huayo =

Huayo may refer to:

- Huayo District, one of thirteen districts of the province Pataz in Peru
- Azúcar huayo, trees in the genus Hymenaea
- Botón huayo (Anthodiscus pilosus), a plant species found in Peru
- Leche huayo (Couma macrocarpa), a plant native to South America
