= Achotillo =

Achotillo may refer to:

- Caryocar amygdaliferum, a plant native to the rain forests of the Choco region of Colombia and Panama.
- Nephelium lappaceum, a plant native to the Malesian bioregion that provides the edible "Rambutan" fruit.
