= C. tomentosum =

C. tomentosum may refer to:

- Calophyllum tomentosum, the bintangur, a flowering plant species found only in Sri Lanka
- Cerastium tomentosum, the snow-in-summer, a flowering plant species
- Clerodendrum tomentosum, the downy chance, hairy lolly bush or hairy clerodendrum, a shrub or small tree species occurring in eastern and northern Australia

== Synonyms ==
- Caryocar tomentosum, a synonym for Caryocar nuciferum, the butter-nut of Guiana or Pekea-nut, a fruit tree species native to northern Brazil, Colombia, Guianas, Peru and Venezuela

== See also ==
- Tomentosum
