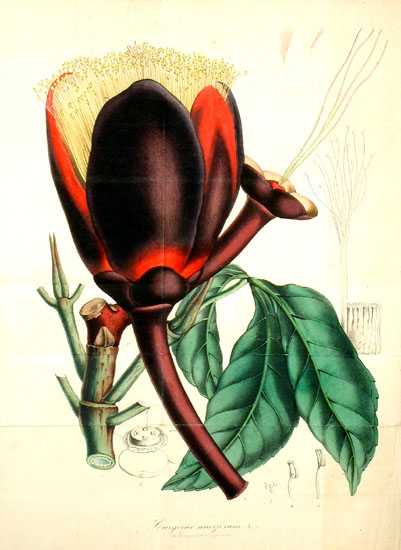
- Pekea-nut (Caryocar nuciferum)
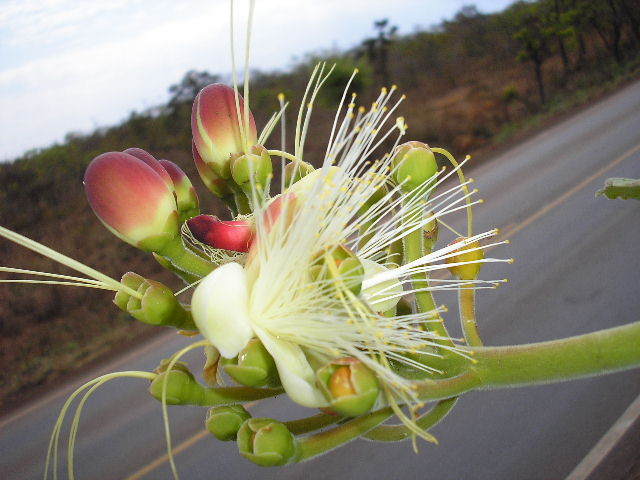
- Caryocar brasiliense

Scientific classification
- Kingdom: Plantae
- Clade: Tracheophytes
- Clade: Angiosperms
- Clade: Eudicots
- Clade: Rosids
- Order: Malpighiales
- Family: Caryocaraceae
- Genus: Caryocar; F.Allam. ex L.

Synonyms
- Pekea Aubl. 1775 not Juss. 1789 (Lecythidaceae); Saouari Aubl.; Rhizobolus G.Gaertn. ex Schreb.; Barollaea Neck.; Acantacaryx Arruda ex Koster, not validly published; Acanthocarya Arruda ex Endl.

= Caryocar =

Genus of flowering plants

Caryocar (souari trees) is a genus of flowering plants, in the South American family Caryocaraceae described as a genus by Linnaeus in 1771. It is native primarily to South America with a few species extending into Central America and the West Indies.

Caryocar consists of trees that yield a strong timber. Some of the species within the genus Caryocar have edible fruits, called souari-nuts or sawarri-nuts. The most well-known species is probably the Pekea-nut (C. nuciferum). In Brazil the Pequi (C. brasiliense) is most popular; it has a variety of uses, not the least among them being the production of pequi oil. Furthermore, some species are used by indigenous peoples to produce poisons for hunting.

Species

1. Caryocar amygdaliferum Mutis - Colombia, Panama
2. Caryocar amygdaliforme G.Don - Ecuador, N Peru
3. Caryocar brasiliense A.St.-Hil. - Brazil, Bolivia, Paraguay
4. Caryocar coriaceum Wittm. - N Brazil
5. Caryocar costaricense Donn.Sm. - Costa Rica
6. Caryocar cuneatum Wittm. - Brazil
7. Caryocar dentatum Gleason - NW Brazil, Bolivia
8. Caryocar edule Casar. - Bahia, Rio de Janeiro
9. Caryocar glabrum (Aubl.) Pers. - French Guiana, Suriname, Guyana, Venezuela, Colombia, Ecuador, Brazil
10. Caryocar microcarpum Ducke - Lesser Antilles, French Guiana, Suriname, Guyana, Venezuela, Colombia, Ecuador, Brazil, Bolivia
11. Caryocar montanum Prance - Guyana, Bolívar, Roraima
12. Caryocar nuciferum L. - Pekea-nut, Butter-nut of Guinea - St. Kitts, St. Vincent, French Guiana, Suriname, Guyana, Venezuela, N Brazil
13. Caryocar pallidum A.C.Sm. - NW Brazil, S Venezuela, Bolivia
14. Caryocar villosum (Aubl.) Pers. - French Guiana, Venezuela, N Brazil, Colombia
