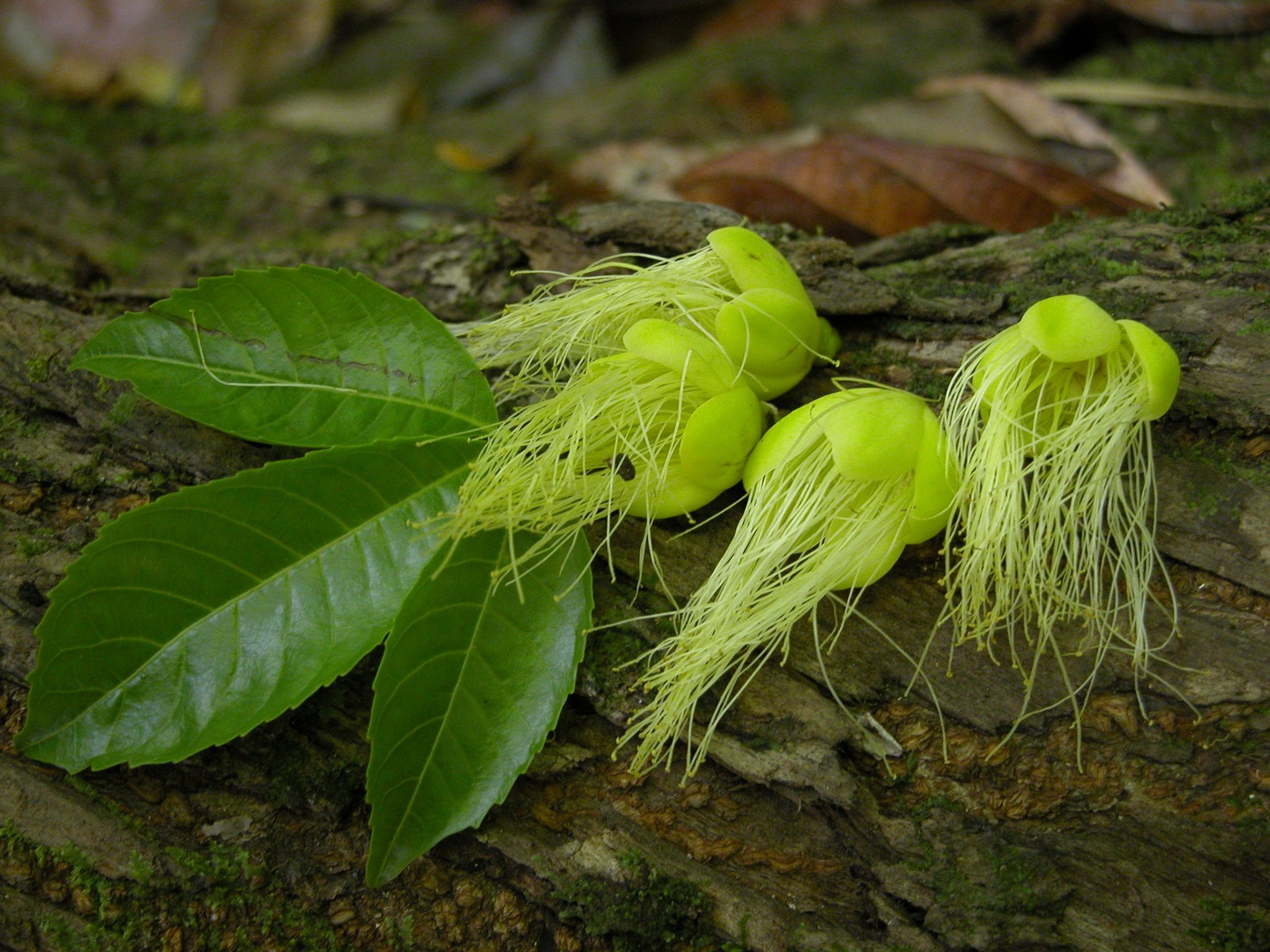

Conservation status
- Endangered (IUCN 3.1)
- CITES Appendix II (CITES)

Scientific classification
- Kingdom: Plantae
- Clade: Tracheophytes
- Clade: Angiosperms
- Clade: Eudicots
- Clade: Rosids
- Order: Malpighiales
- Family: Caryocaraceae
- Genus: Caryocar
- Species: C. costaricense

Binomial name
- Caryocar costaricense J.D. Sm.

= Caryocar costaricense =

Species of flowering plant

Caryocar costaricense is a species of plant in the Caryocaraceae family. It is found in Colombia, Costa Rica, Panama, and Venezuela. It is threatened by habitat loss.
