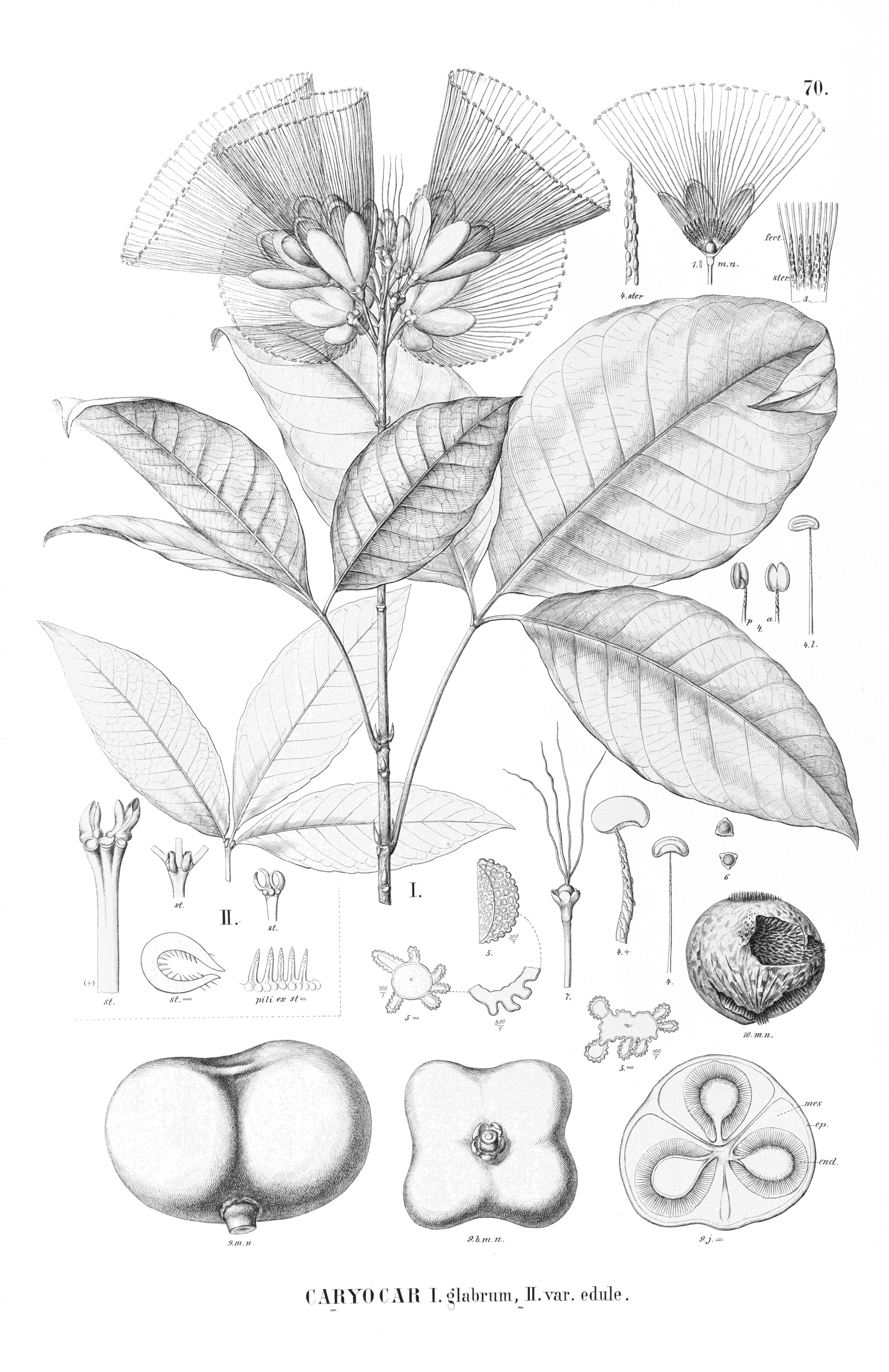
- Illustration of Caryocar glabrum (1858-1879); Flora Brasiliensis vol. 12 pt. 1 tab. 70; Author Carl Friedrich Philipp von Martius (1794-1868), August Wilhelm Eichler (1839-1887), Ignaz Urban (1848-1931)

Scientific classification
- Kingdom: Plantae
- Clade: Embryophytes
- Clade: Tracheophytes
- Clade: Spermatophytes
- Clade: Angiosperms
- Clade: Eudicots
- Clade: Rosids
- Order: Malpighiales
- Family: Caryocaraceae
- Genus: Caryocar
- Species: C. glabrum

Binomial name
- Caryocar glabrum (Aubl.) Pers.

Synonyms
- Caryocar microcarpum Ducke; Saouari glabra Aubl.

= Caryocar glabrum =

Species of tree

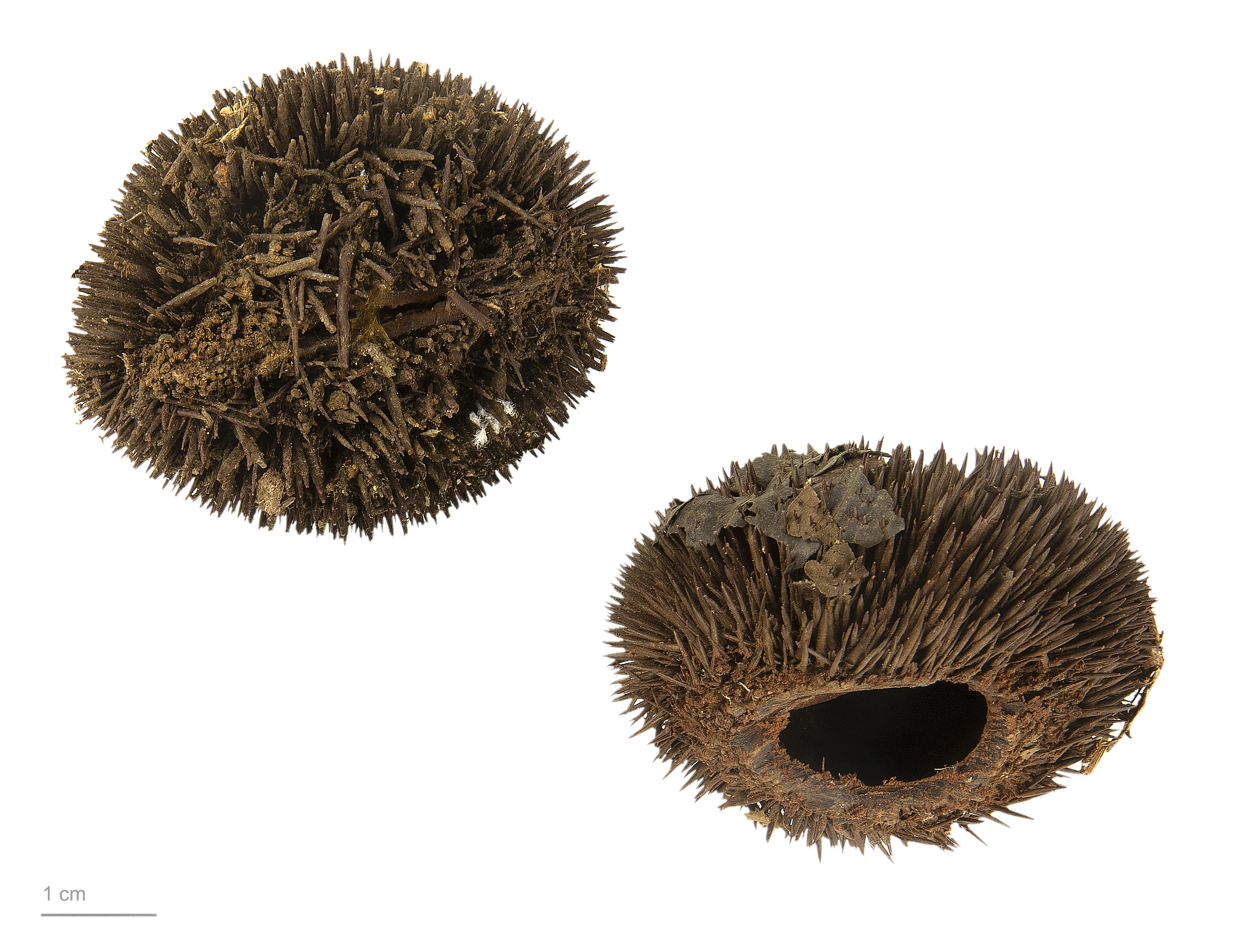
Caryocar glabrum MHNT

Caryocar glabrum is a species of tree in the family Caryocaraceae. It is native to South America.

== Chemical compounds ==
Dihydroisocoumarin glucosides can be found in C. glabrum.
