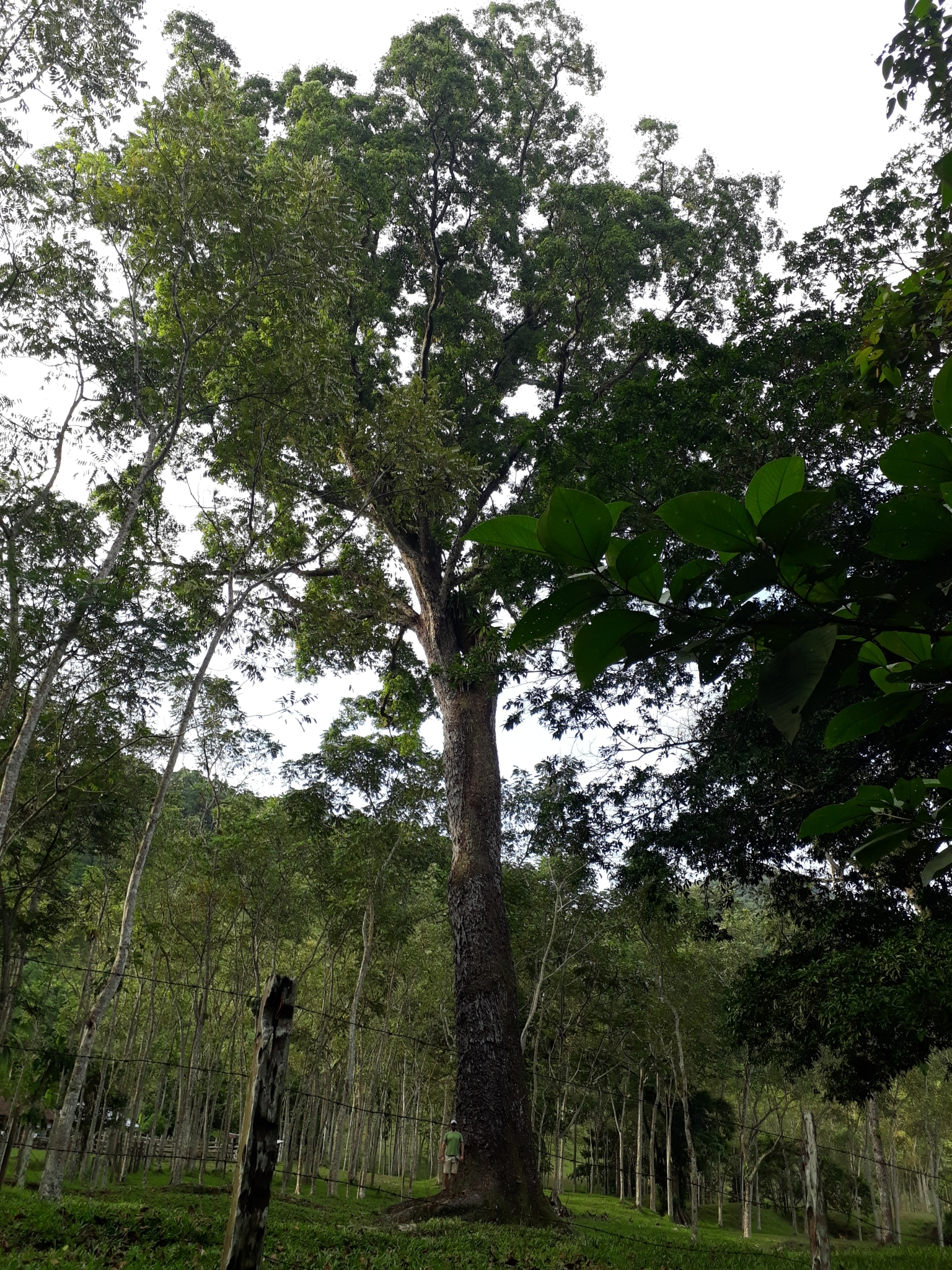

Scientific classification
- Kingdom: Plantae
- Clade: Embryophytes
- Clade: Tracheophytes
- Clade: Angiosperms
- Clade: Eudicots
- Clade: Rosids
- Order: Malpighiales
- Family: Caryocaraceae
- Genus: Caryocar
- Species: C. amygdaliferum

Binomial name
- Caryocar amygdaliferum Mutis ex Cav.

= Caryocar amygdaliferum =

Species of flowering plant

Caryocar amygdaliferum is a plant native to the rain forests of the Choco region of Colombia and Panama. Its fruit consists of a spiny husk inside which a seed about three times the size of an almond develops. It has been used for similar purpose as the almond and was traded as a luxury item among the Inca in pre-conquest times and grown in the land of the Chachapoyas. It is also eaten by some species of bats.
