= Couroupita nicaraguarensis =

Bala de cañón

Conservation status
- Least Concern (IUCN 3.1)

Scientific classification
- Kingdom: Plantae
- Clade: Tracheophytes
- Clade: Angiosperms
- Clade: Eudicots
- Clade: Asterids
- Order: Ericales
- Family: Lecythidaceae
- Genus: Couroupita
- Species: C. nicaraguarensis

Binomial name
- Couroupita nicaraguarensis DC.

Species of plant

Couroupita nicaraguarensis (the epithet often spelled as nicaraguensis), the bala de cañón, coco de mono, paraíso, zapote de mico, or zapote de mono, is a species of woody plant in the family Lecythidaceae. It is found in Colombia, Costa Rica, Ecuador, El Salvador, Nicaragua, Puerto Rico and Panama. It is threatened by habitat loss. In Puerto Rico, the only place it is found at is Toa Alta, Puerto Rico.
