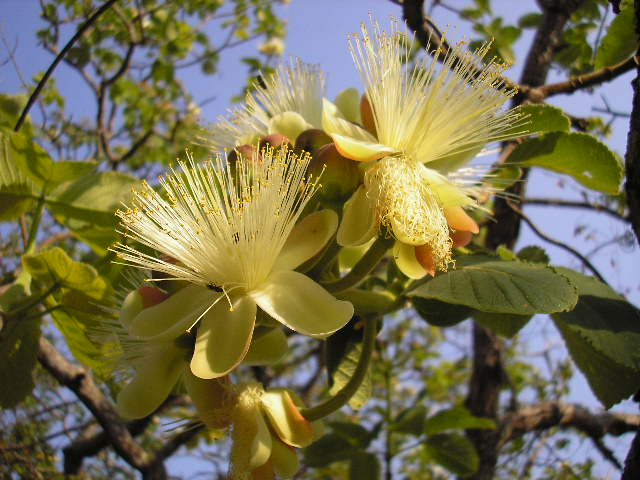
- Flowers and leaves

Conservation status
- Least Concern (IUCN 3.1)

Scientific classification
- Kingdom: Plantae
- Clade: Tracheophytes
- Clade: Angiosperms
- Clade: Eudicots
- Clade: Rosids
- Order: Malpighiales
- Family: Caryocaraceae
- Genus: Caryocar
- Species: C. brasiliense

Binomial name
- Caryocar brasiliense Cambess.

Synonyms
- Caryocar brasiliensis (lapsus)

= Caryocar brasiliense =

Pequi

Species of tree

Caryocar brasiliense, known as pequi (Portuguese pronunciation: [peˈki]) or souari nut, is an edible fruit popular in some areas of Brazil, especially in central-west Brazil.

== Description ==
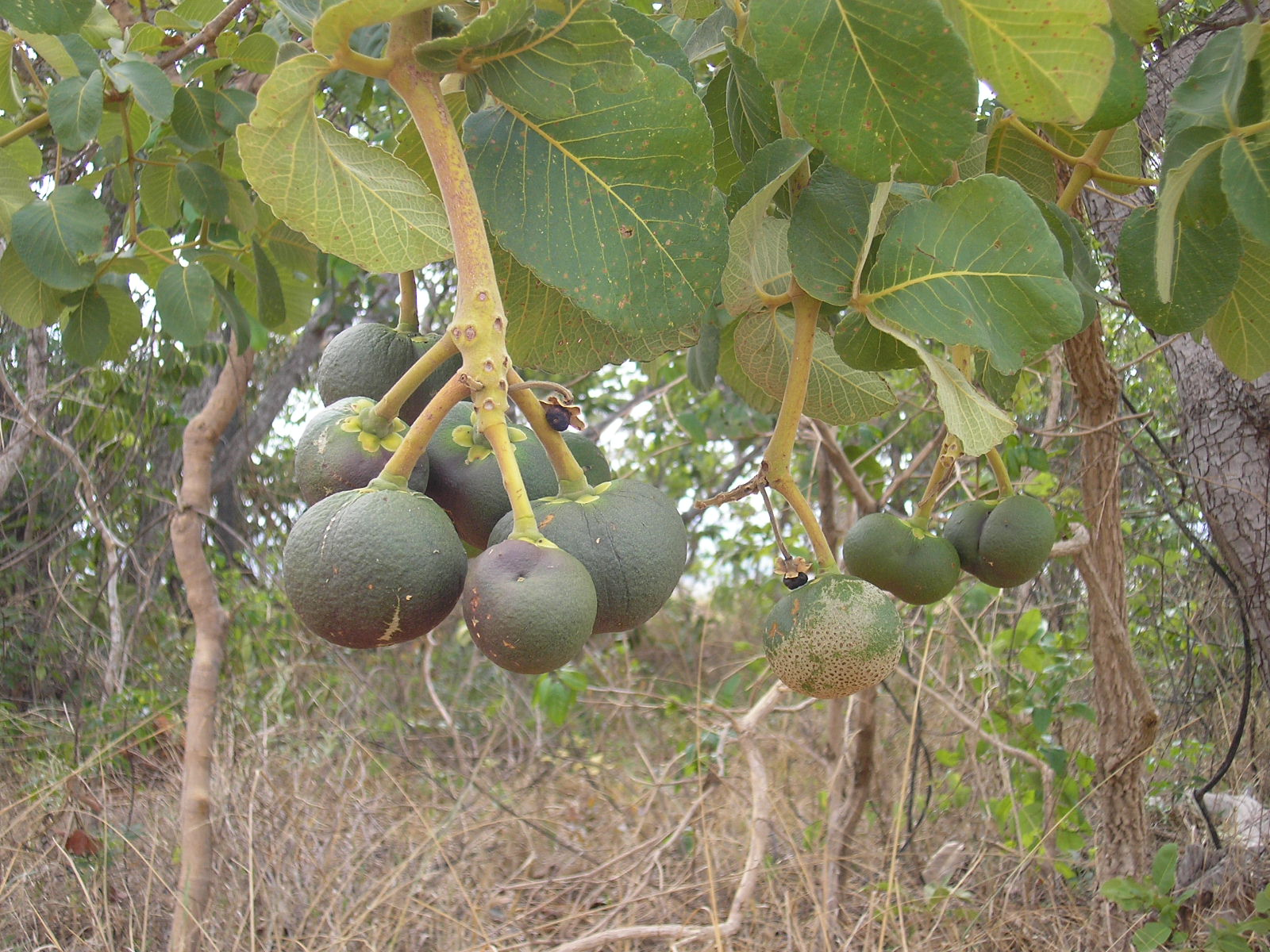
Ripening fruits

The pequi tree grows up to 10 m (30 ft) tall. It is common in the central Brazilian cerrado habitat from southern Pará to Paraná and northern Paraguay. It is also native to Bolivia. Its leaves are large, tough, hairy and palmate, with three leaflets each. Unlike most other cerrado trees, it bears flowers in the dry winter months, approximately July to September.

The yellowish-white flowers are hermaphroditic and bear many stamens; they somewhat resemble a huge pale St John's Wort flower (a distant relative among the Malpighiales). There are often two dozen or more flowers per inflorescence.

== Pollination ==
Pollination is mainly by bats and, as usual in such cases, the flowers do not have a pleasant smell but produce copious thin nectar. Flowers open in the evening and produce nectar throughout the night, ceasing in the early morning. Each night's last nectar, produced around dawn, seems richer in sugars than that produced in the night, though it is much less in quantity. Moths, nocturnal wasps and ants visit the flowers at night. The former two might do some pollinating but they are not known to be of major importance.

During the day, the flowers are visited by bees and wasps which feed on remaining pollen. From dusk to the cessation of nectar production, hummingbirds may visit the flowers. While most of them only do this opportunistically, some species — e.g., the fork-tailed woodnymph (Thalurania furcata) and in particular the glittering-throated emerald (Chionomesa fimbriata) — appear to visit pequi tree flowers on a regular basis.

More significantly, visits by small "tanagers" of the Thraupidae and Cardinalidae families around dusk are noted. In particular species like the guira tanager (Hemithraupis guira), white-lined tanager (Tachyphonus rufus) and the palm (Thraupis palmarum) and sayaca tanagers (T. sayaca) seem to be quite fond of pequi flower nectar and spend considerable time feeding on it when available. But even curl-crested jays (Cyanocorax cristatellus) have been observed to hang about flowering pequi trees at daybreak, though perhaps not just for the nectar, considering many insects attracted by it earlier would still be around on the tree.

As the stigmata dry out at daybreak, it is not clear whether birds, particularly tanagers, play a role in pollination or are merely making use of an easy early-morning snack, particularly considering that during the flowering season of C. brasiliense, little such food is available.

== Fruits ==
Fruits start off dark purple, turning olive green and finally buff green as they ripen, taking about 5–6 months. Ripe fruits are about the size of an orange. They resemble a mangosteen (another distantly related member of the Malpighiales) in having a few (usually 1–4) segments of pulpy pericarp inside the skin, yellow and with a typical strong taste and smell mixing sweet, fruity and cheesy aromas. This is derived mainly from volatile ethyl esters.

Embedded in the mesocarp is a light-colored seed enclosed in a blackish shell covered with thin and tough woody spines, though spineless individuals exist in the wild. Both the mesocarp and the seed are edible for humans as well as many animals, including usually carnivorous species like the yellow-headed caracara (Milvago chimachima).

== Use by humans and status ==
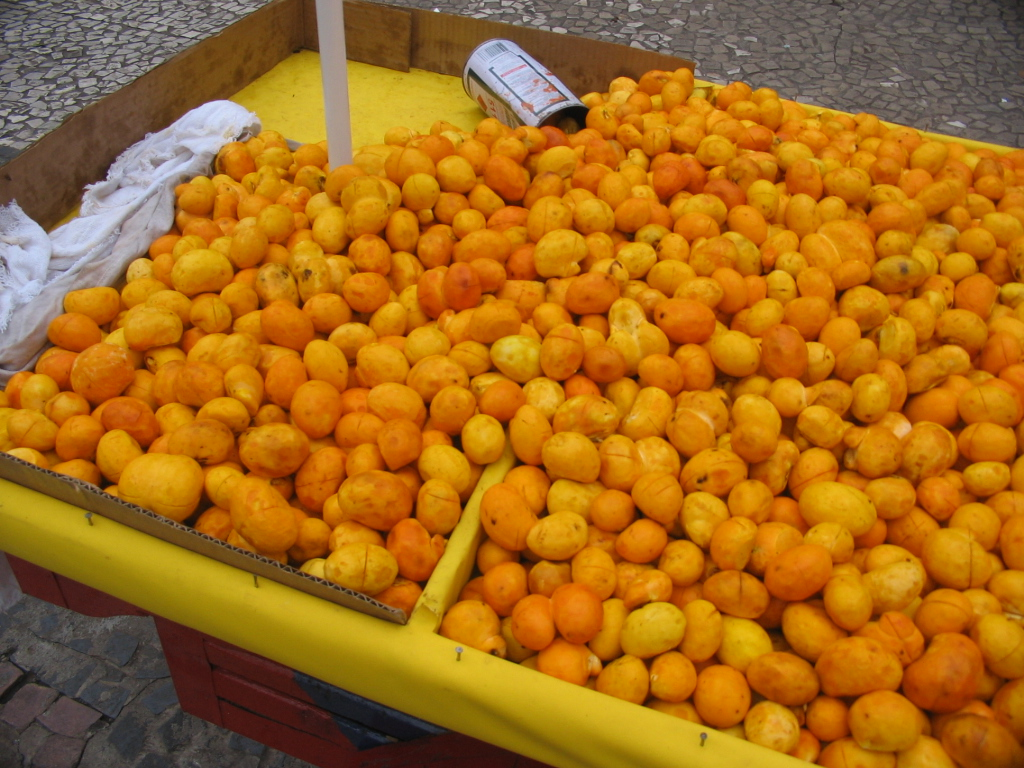
Pequi for sale in Cuiabá, Brazil

Pequi pulp is a very popular food in Goiás, Mato Grosso, Mato Grosso do Sul and Minas Gerais, eaten by itself raw or prepared or used as an ingredient in cooking or to flavor beverages. Pequi with rice and chicken is an especially popular preparation.

Pequi pulp will tarnish silver cutlery and, if eaten raw, the fruit is best enjoyed out of hand. Care must be taken to gently scrape the pulp off the pit using one's teeth: The spines can detach and hurt the mouth, causing considerable pain and being difficult to remove.

The pits with spines and remaining pulp can be left to dry in the sun for two days or so. Afterwards, the spines can be scraped off with a knife or stick, and the pit can be cracked open to extract the seed. From the latter, the edible pequi oil is extracted commercially. They can also be roasted like peanuts and eaten with salt as a rich snack.

Nearly every part of the tree is usable for food, medical or construction purposes. Pequi occupies an important role in the culture of indigenous people in Brazil's Cerrado region. Traditionally, rural Brazilians plant pequi trees around villages; the seeds take a long time to germinate so that new trees must be planted every so often for the supply not to cease. Demand for the fruit has risen in recent decades while habitat has been destroyed, putting the stocks under strain. One report writes:

"The pequi is the main symbol of this de-structuring of the economy. The pequi is habitually consumed by the population in the Cerrado zone and is deeply rooted in the regional culture and cooking. For the Mineiros, the Cerrado inhabitants of Minas Gerais, the pequi does not belong to anyone, because it belongs to all. Therefore, they maintain their ancestral right to take it wherever it is, in public or private land, fenced in land or unfenced land, etc., wherever it is, the pequi was always "accessible" to the regional society."

== Ecological relevance ==
Given the importance of bats and perhaps birds for pollination, removal of native woodland is liable to have long-term negative impacts on fruit yield even if no C. brasiliense trees are physically harmed. This is true for other native pollinators, such as Melipona quadrifasciata and Scaptotrigona postica, because they nest in pequi trees, commonly building nests in the hollows of the trees. Conserving pollinator habitat is probably crucial for rich yields of the valuable fruits and other produce.
