= Anthodiscus pilosus =

Scientific classification
- Kingdom: Plantae
- Clade: Tracheophytes
- Clade: Angiosperms
- Clade: Eudicots
- Clade: Rosids
- Order: Malpighiales
- Family: Caryocaraceae
- Genus: Anthodiscus
- Species: A. pilosus

Binomial name
- Anthodiscus pilosus Ducke, 1947

Species of flowering plant

Anthodiscus pilosus (chamisa, tahuari, botón caspi, botón huayo or tahuarí amarillo) is a plant species in the genus Anthodiscus found in Amazonian Colombia and Peru.

Anthodiscus pilosus is added to some versions of the hallucinogenic drink Ayahuasca.
