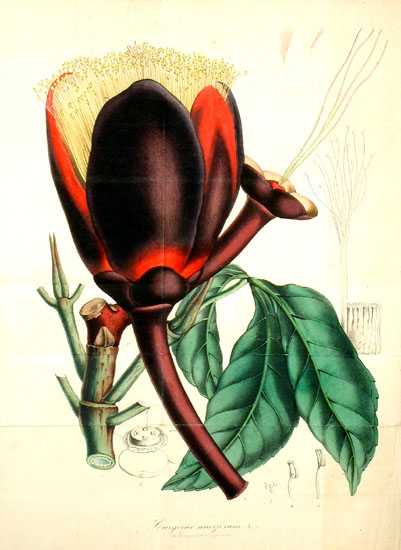

Scientific classification
- Kingdom: Plantae
- Clade: Tracheophytes
- Clade: Angiosperms
- Clade: Eudicots
- Clade: Rosids
- Order: Malpighiales
- Family: Caryocaraceae
- Genus: Caryocar
- Species: C. nuciferum

Binomial name
- Caryocar nuciferum L.

Synonyms
- Caryocar tomentosum Willd. Caryocar tuberculosum (Aubl.) Baill. Pekea tuberculosa Aubl.

= Caryocar nuciferum =

Species of fruit and plant

Caryocar nuciferum, the butter-nut of Guiana, is a fruit tree native to Central and South America.

== Description ==
Caryocar nuciferum grows up to 35 metres (115 ft) in humid forests. Flowers are hermaphroditic and in small clusters. The large coconut-sized fruit, weighs about 3 kilograms (6.6 lb), is round or pear-shaped some 10–15 centimetres (4–6 in) in diameter, and greyish-brown in colour. The outer skin is leathery, about 1 millimetre (1/16 in) thick, and covered in rust-coloured lenticels.

The Encyclopædia Britannica Eleventh Edition (1911) calls the fruit "perhaps the finest of all [those] called nuts. The kernel is large, soft, and even sweeter than the almond, which it somewhat resembles in taste."

Pulp of the mesocarp is oily and sticky, holding 1–4 hard, woody, warty stones, with reniform endocarp.

== Taxonomy ==
Caryocar nuciferum is illustrated and discussed in detail in Curtis's Botanical Magazine volume 54 (1827), and figured on plates 2727 and 2728 using material sent from the island of Saint Vincent by Lansdown Guilding.

It is also known as pekea-nut, or – like all other species of Caryocar with edible nuts – "souari-nut" or "sawarri-nut".

== Distribution ==
The species is native to Costa Rica, Panama, northern Brazil, Colombia, Guyana, and Venezuela.

== Uses ==
The endocarp is eaten raw or roasted, and produces a nondrying edible oil. The wood is durable and used for boat building. The correctly expressed oil of its nuts produces an effective healing balm.
