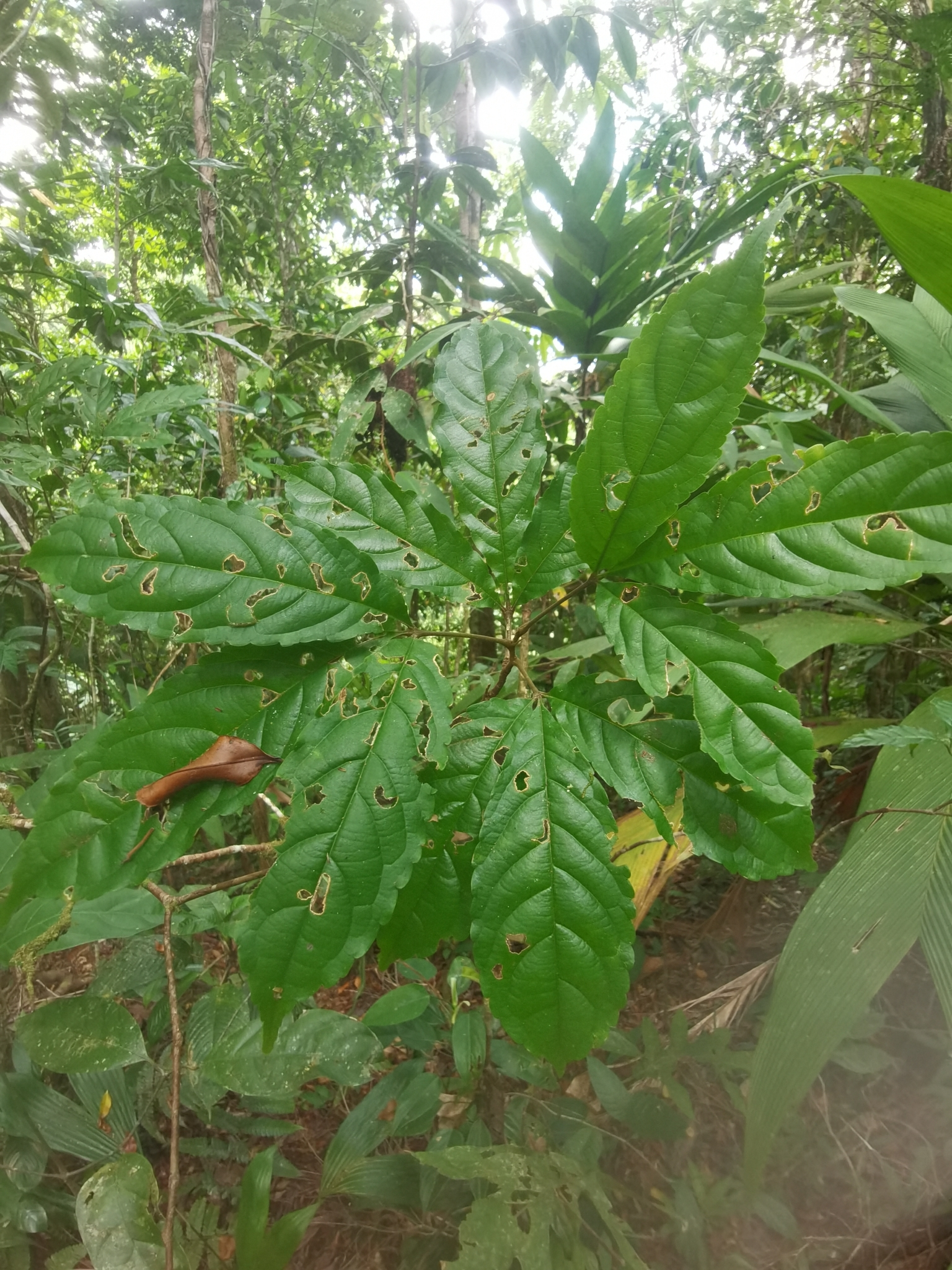
- Anthodiscus chocoensis

Scientific classification
- Kingdom: Plantae
- Clade: Tracheophytes
- Clade: Angiosperms
- Clade: Eudicots
- Clade: Rosids
- Order: Malpighiales
- Family: Caryocaraceae
- Genus: Anthodiscus; G.Mey.

= Anthodiscus =

Genus of flowering plants

Anthodiscus is a genus of plant in family Caryocaraceae described as a genus in 1818.

The genus is native to South America.

Species

1. Anthodiscus amazonicus Gleason & A.C.Sm. - Brazil, Colombia, Ecuador
2. Anthodiscus chocoensis Prance - Colombia
3. Anthodiscus fragrans Sleumer - Ecuador
4. Anthodiscus klugii Standl. ex Prance - Ecuador, N Peru
5. Anthodiscus mazarunensis Gilly - Suriname, Guyana, Venezuela
6. Anthodiscus montanus Gleason - Colombia
7. Anthodiscus obovatus Benth. ex Wittm. - Colombia, Venezuela, N Brazil
8. Anthodiscus peruanus Baill. - Ecuador, N Peru
9. Anthodiscus pilosus Ducke - Colombia, N Peru
10. Anthodiscus trifoliatus G.Mey. - Guyana
