= Pequi oil =

Edible oil made from pequi

Pequi oil is a seed oil, extracted from the seeds of the Caryocar brasiliense, which is native to Brazil. The pale yellow mesocarp oil is extracted and used directly as a cooking oil. In Brazil, there are projects among indigenous people groups to develop pequi oil production as a means of economic development.

Pequi oil contains 44.2% palmitic and 51.7% oleic acid, with linolenic and stearic acids in much smaller amounts.
