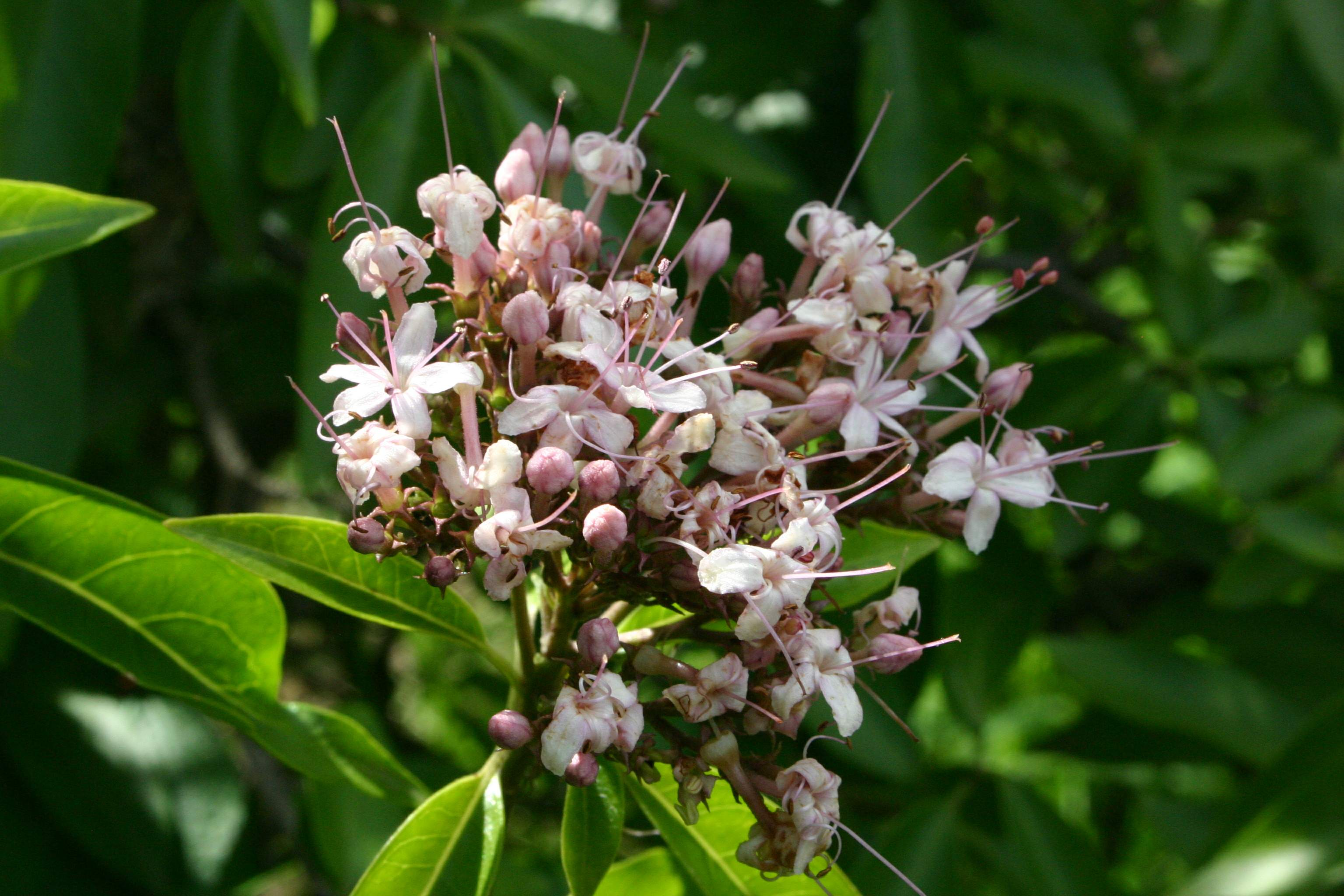

Scientific classification
- Kingdom: Plantae
- Clade: Tracheophytes
- Clade: Angiosperms
- Clade: Eudicots
- Clade: Asterids
- Order: Lamiales
- Family: Lamiaceae
- Genus: Clerodendrum
- Species: C. glabrum

Binomial name
- Clerodendrum glabrum E.Mey.

= Clerodendrum glabrum =

Species of tree

Clerodendrum glabrum is a small to medium deciduous tree, widespread from Tropical to Southern Africa.

In common with others of this family, its bark is covered in prominent white lenticels. Leaves are usually in whorls of 3 and produce a fetid smell when crushed. The fragrant flowers are usually mauve with strongly exserted stamens and style, a common characteristic of the genus, and are borne in dense, terminal clusters. Closely related are Clerodendrum thomsoniae (Bleeding Heart) and Clerodendrum ugandense, known as Oxford and Cambridge bush because of its two tones of blue.

== See also ==
- List of Southern African indigenous trees
