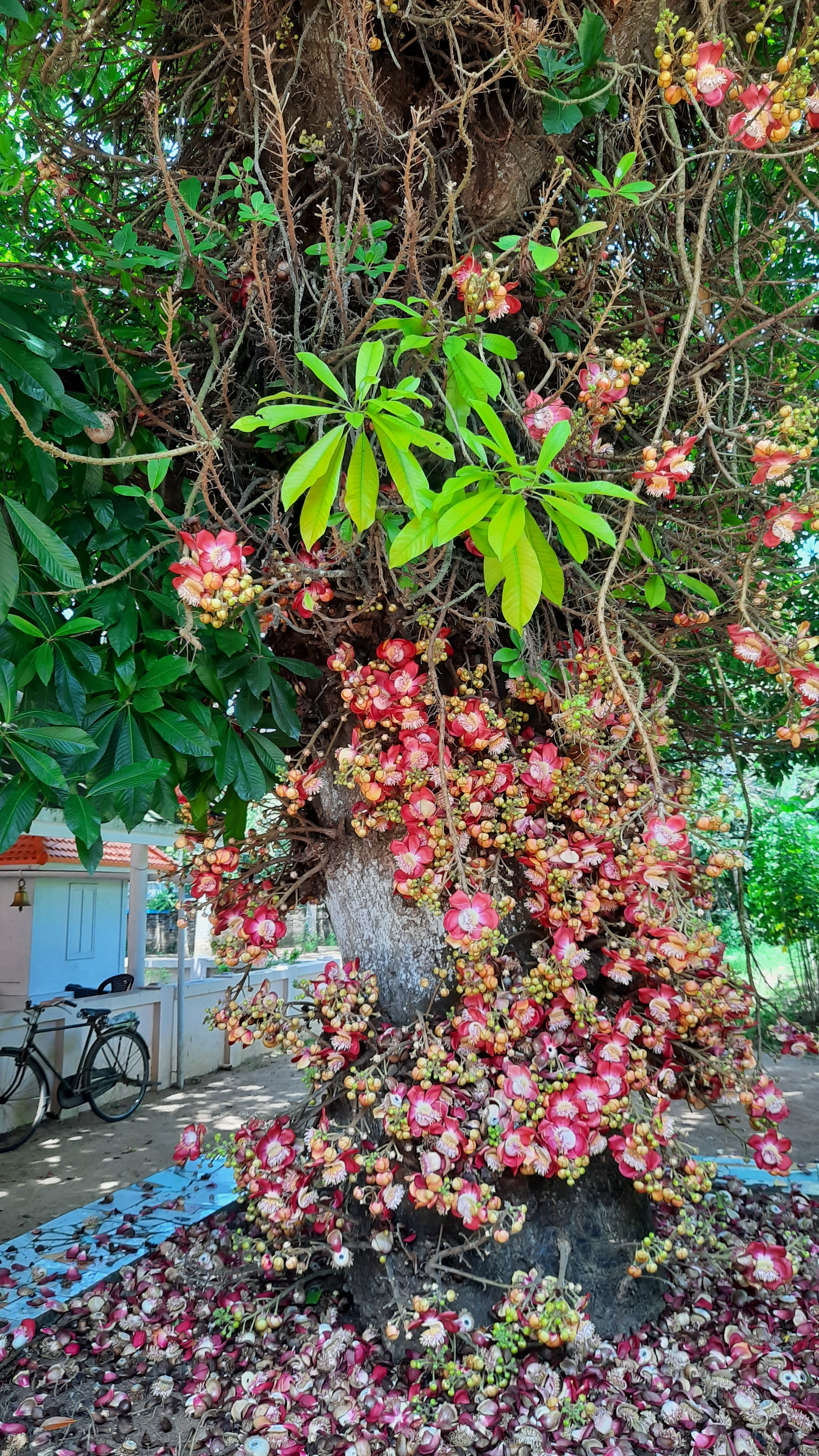

Conservation status
- Least Concern (IUCN 2.3)

Scientific classification
- Kingdom: Plantae
- Clade: Tracheophytes
- Clade: Angiosperms
- Clade: Eudicots
- Clade: Asterids
- Order: Ericales
- Family: Lecythidaceae
- Genus: Couroupita
- Species: C. guianensis

Binomial name
- Couroupita guianensis Aubl.

Synonyms
- Couratari pedicellaris Rizzini; Couroupita acreensis R.Knuth; Couroupita antillana Miers; Couroupita froesii R.Knuth; Couroupita guianensis var. surinamensis (Mart. ex Berg) Eyma; Couroupita idolica Dwyer; Couroupita membranacea Miers; Couroupita peruviana O.Berg; Couroupita saintcroixiana R.Knuth; Couroupita surinamensis Mart. ex O.Berg; Couroupita venezuelensis R.Knuth; Lecythis bracteata Willd.; Pekea couroupita Juss. ex DC.

= Couroupita guianensis =

Species of flowering plant

Couroupita guianensis, known by a variety of common names including cannonball tree, is a deciduous tree in the flowering plant family Lecythidaceae. It is native to lowland tropical rainforests of Central and South America, from Costa Rica, south to Brazil and northern Bolivia and it is cultivated in many other tropical areas throughout the world because of its fragrant flowers and large fruit, which are brownish grey. There are potential medicinal uses for many parts of Couroupita guianensis, and the tree has cultural and religious significance in South and Southeast Asia. In Sri Lanka and India, the cannonball tree has been widely misidentified as the Sal tree (Shorea robusta), after its introduction to the island by the British in 1881, and has been included as a common item in Buddhist temples as a result.

== Description ==
Couroupita guianensis is a tree that reaches heights of up to 35 metres (110 ft). The leaves, which occur in clusters at the ends of branches, are usually 8 to 31 cm (3.1 to 12.2 in) long, but can reach lengths of up to 57 cm (22 in).

=== Flowers ===
The flowers are borne in racemes up to 80 cm (31 in) long produced directly on the tree's trunk. They are considered an extreme example of cauliflory named flagelliflory. Some trees flower profusely until the entire trunk is covered with racemes. One tree can hold as many as 1000 flowers per day. The flowers are strongly scented, and are especially fragrant at night and in the early morning. They are up to 6 cm (2.4 in) in diameter, with six petals, and are typically brightly coloured, with the petals ranging from shades of pink and red near the bases to yellowish toward the tips. There are two areas of stamens: a ring of stamens at the centre, and an arrangement of stamens that have been modified into a hood.

=== Fruit ===
The fruit is spherical with a woody shell, and reaches a diameter of up to 25 cm (10 in), giving the species the common name "cannonball tree". Smaller fruit may contain about 65 seeds, while large ones can hold as many as 550. One tree can bear 150 fruit at a time. The fruit takes up to a year to mature in most areas, sometimes as long as 18 months. The fruit flesh is white and turns blue upon oxidation, a reaction with air. Tropical nature photographer Kjell Sandved was nearly hit by a falling cannonball fruit, which weighed 1 kg (2.2 lb), probably an average weight.

== Scientific name ==
The tree was named Couroupita guianensis by the French botanist Jean Baptiste Christophore Fusée Aublet in 1775.

The Latin specific epithet guianensis means "of the Guianas", an area of northeastern South America.

== Pollination ==
Although the flowers lack nectar, they are very attractive to bees, which come for the pollen. The flowers produce two types of pollen: fertile pollen from the ring stamens, and sterile pollen from the hood structure. The pollinators must work their way between the two areas of stamens as they gather the pollen. The carpenter bee Xylocopa brasilianorum is a common pollinator of cultivated trees in Rio de Janeiro, just outside the tree's native range. Other carpenter bees such as Xylocopa frontalis, as well as wasps, flower flies, and bumblebees, are also known to visit the flowers.

== Dispersal ==
The seeds are dispersed by animals that feed on the fruit. When the fruit falls to the ground, the hard, woody shell usually cracks open, exposing the pulp and seeds. Fruits that remain whole may be broken open by animals such as peccaries. Many animals feed on the pulp and seeds, including peccaries, the paca, and domestic chickens and pigs. The seeds are covered with trichomes which may protect them as they pass through the animals' digestive systems.

== Human uses ==
Couroupita guianensis is planted as an ornamental tree for its showy, scented flowers, and as a botanical specimen for its fruit.

The fruit is edible but is not usually eaten by people because, in contrast to its intensely fragrant flowers, it can have an unpleasant smell.

Parts of the plant have been used in traditional medicine. It has been used to treat hypertension, tumors, pain, and inflammation, the common cold, stomachache, skin conditions and wounds, malaria, and toothache, although data on its efficacy are lacking.

The fruit and flowers are known to contain the chemical compounds indigotin and indirubin, the same blue dye compounds contained by the indigo plant (Indigofera tinctoria), and studies are being made of its possible use as a natural dye for fibres.

== Cultural significance ==
While the tree is not native to Asia, having only been introduced there in the last 300 years, its identity has been conflated with other trees mentioned in Hindu and Buddhist scripture, especially the Sal tree. In India and Sri Lanka, the tree is venerated by Hindus, who believe its hooded flowers look like the nāga under which the white stigma looks like a Lingam, and hence, it is grown at Shiva temples. The cannonball tree has since then been planted at Buddhist and Hindu religious sites in Asia in the belief that it is the tree of sacred scriptures. In Sri Lanka, Thailand and other Theravada Buddhist countries it has been planted at Buddhist monasteries and other religious sites.

== Gallery ==
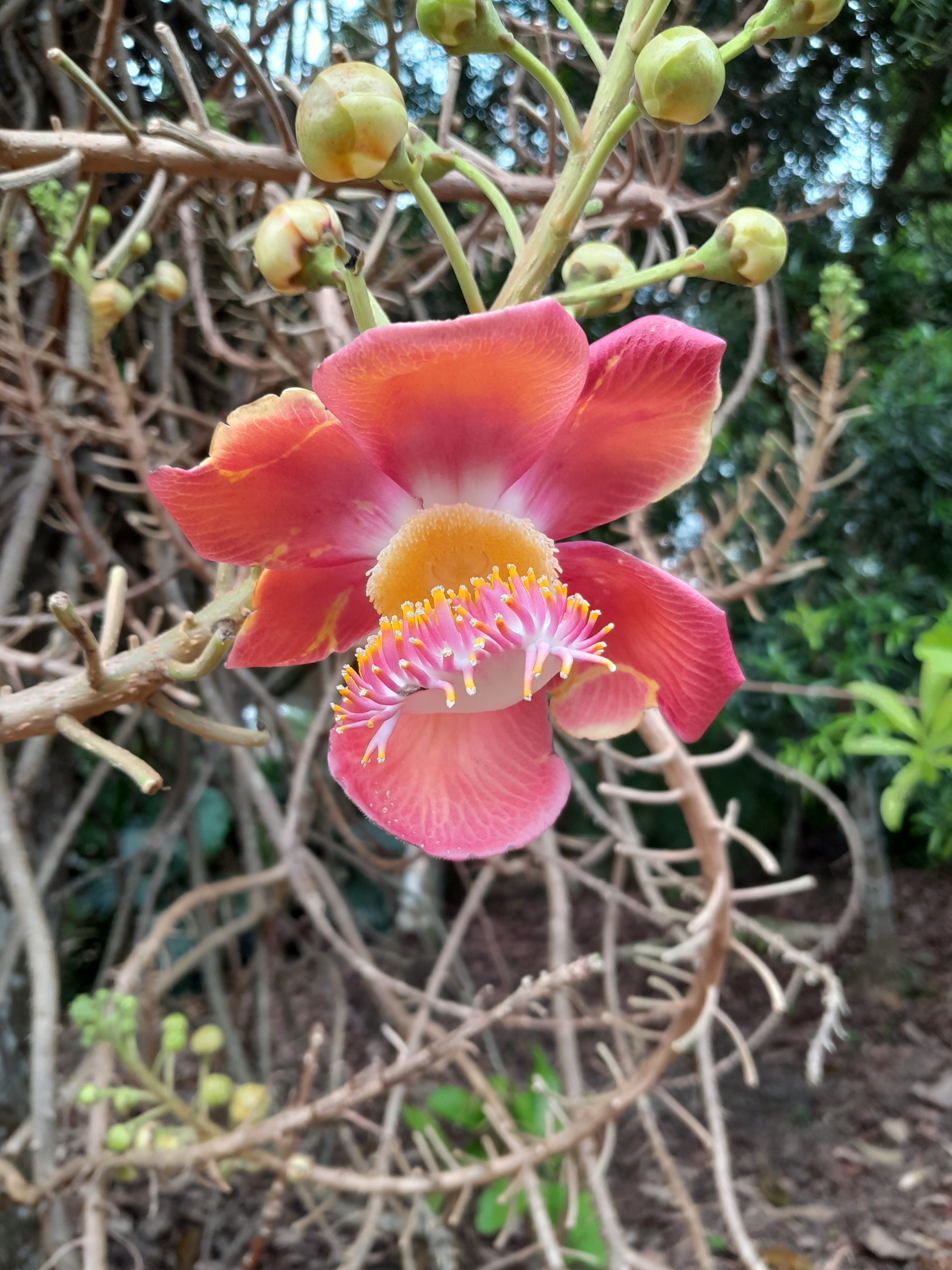
A flower (Singapore Botanic Gardens)

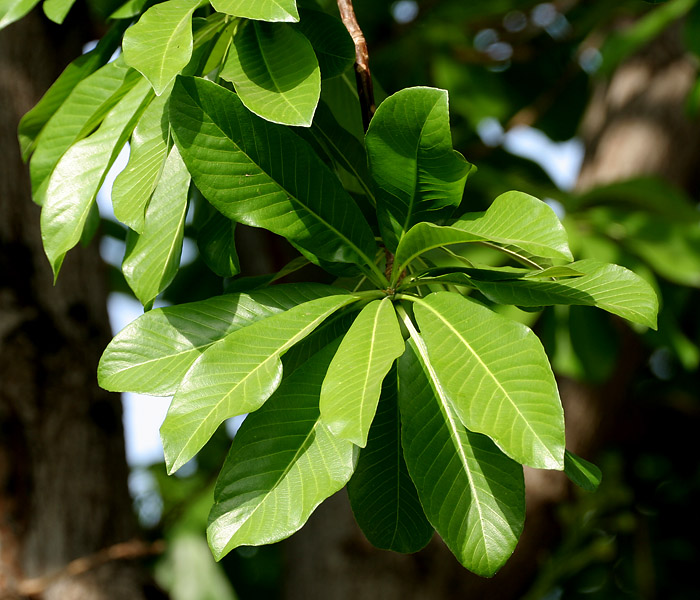
Leaves (Hyderabad, India)

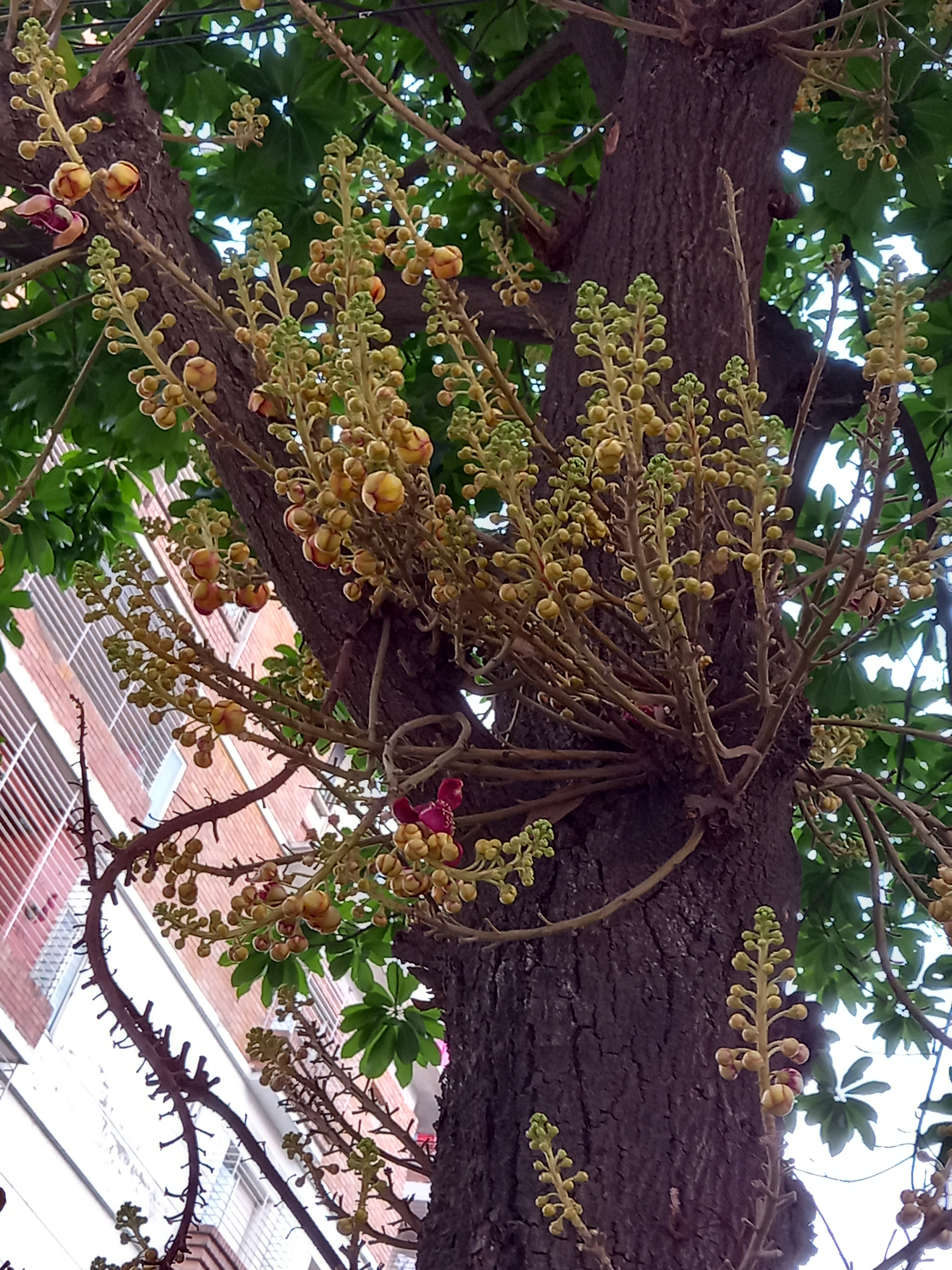
Inflorescences with flowers in bud (Dhaka, Bangladesh)

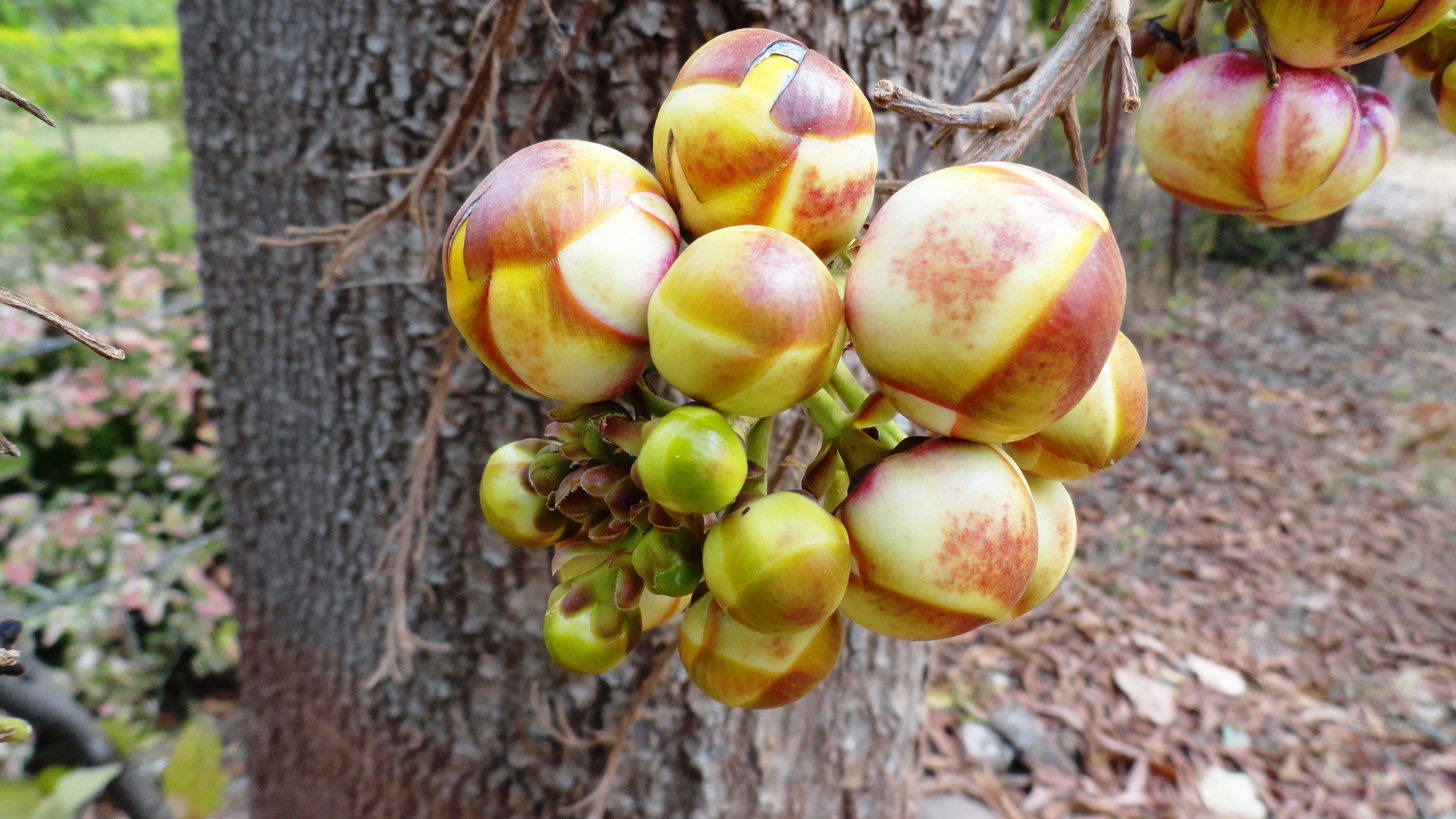
Flower buds close up (Maharashtra, India)

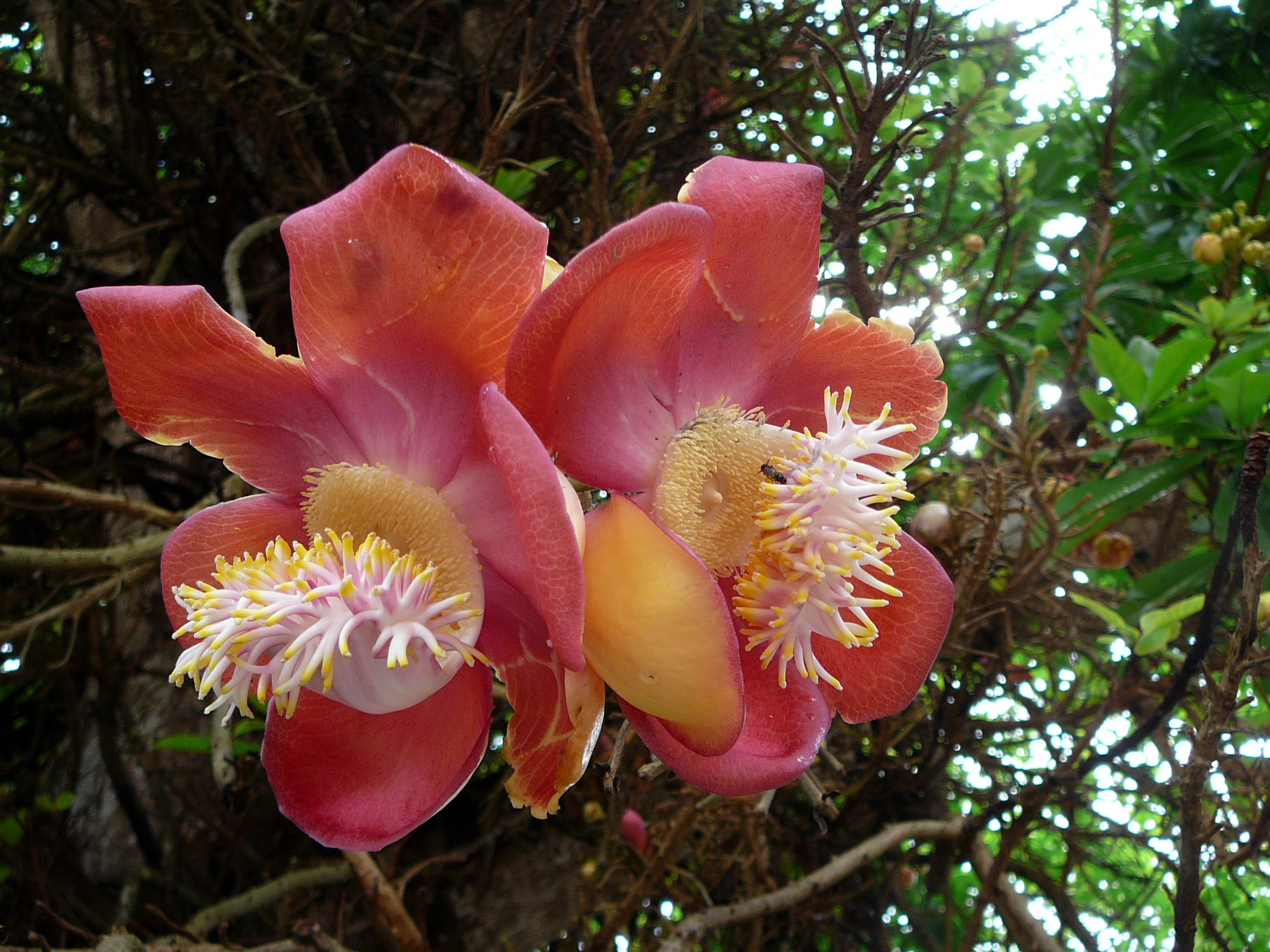
Flowers

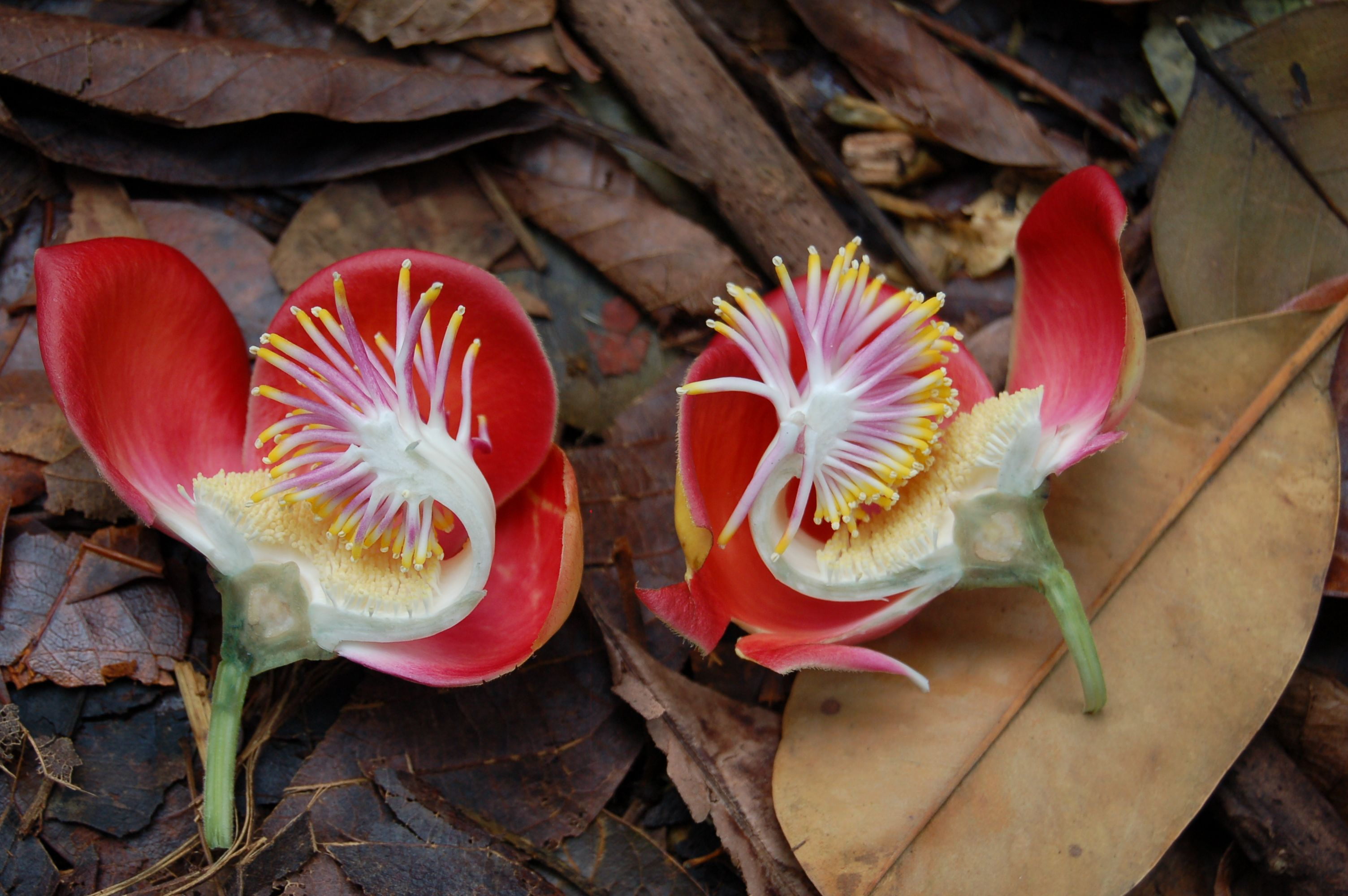
Flower in longitudinal section showing ovary (Jardín Botánico de Cienfuegos, Cuba)

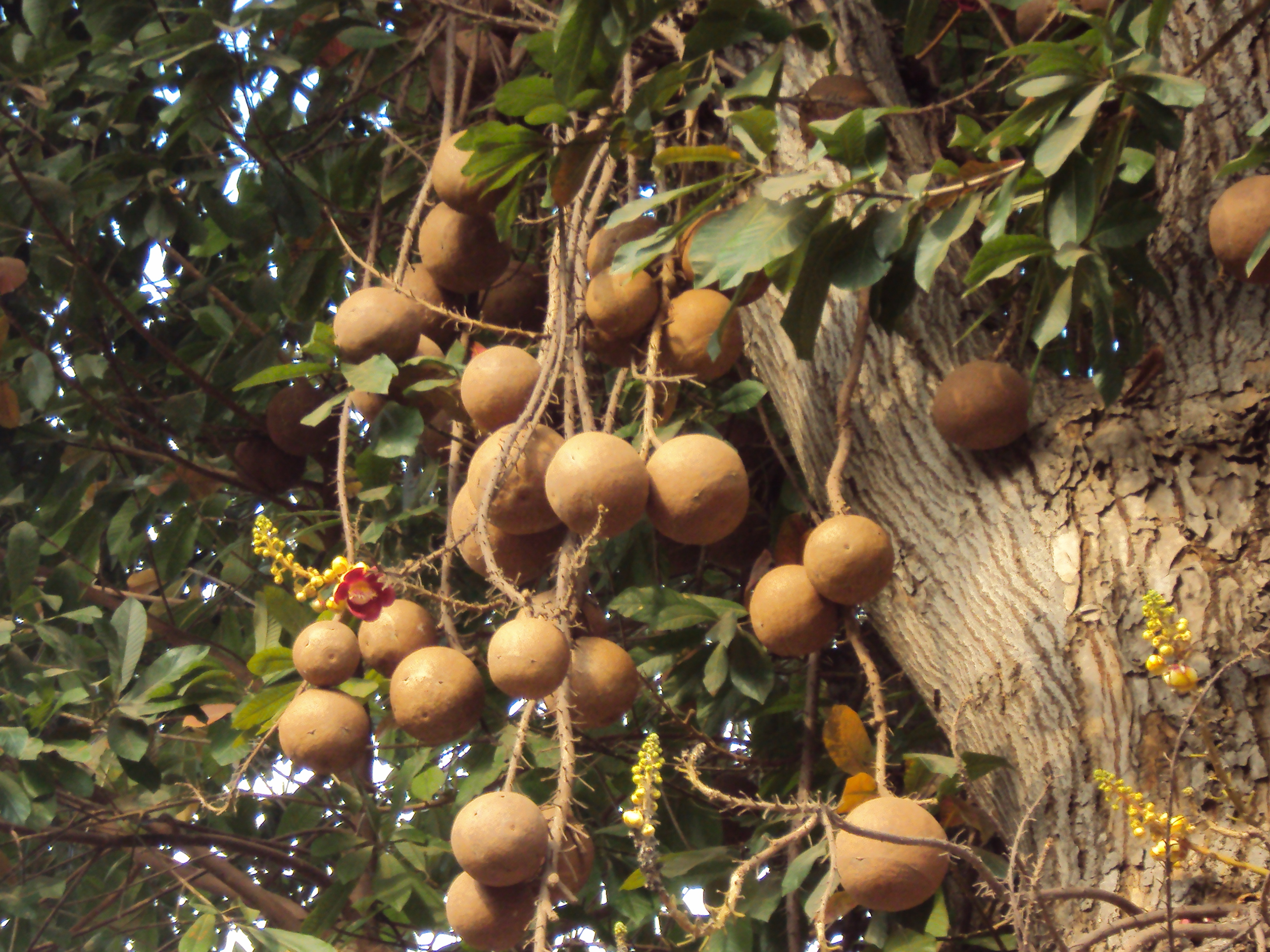
Fruit (Tamil Nadu, India)

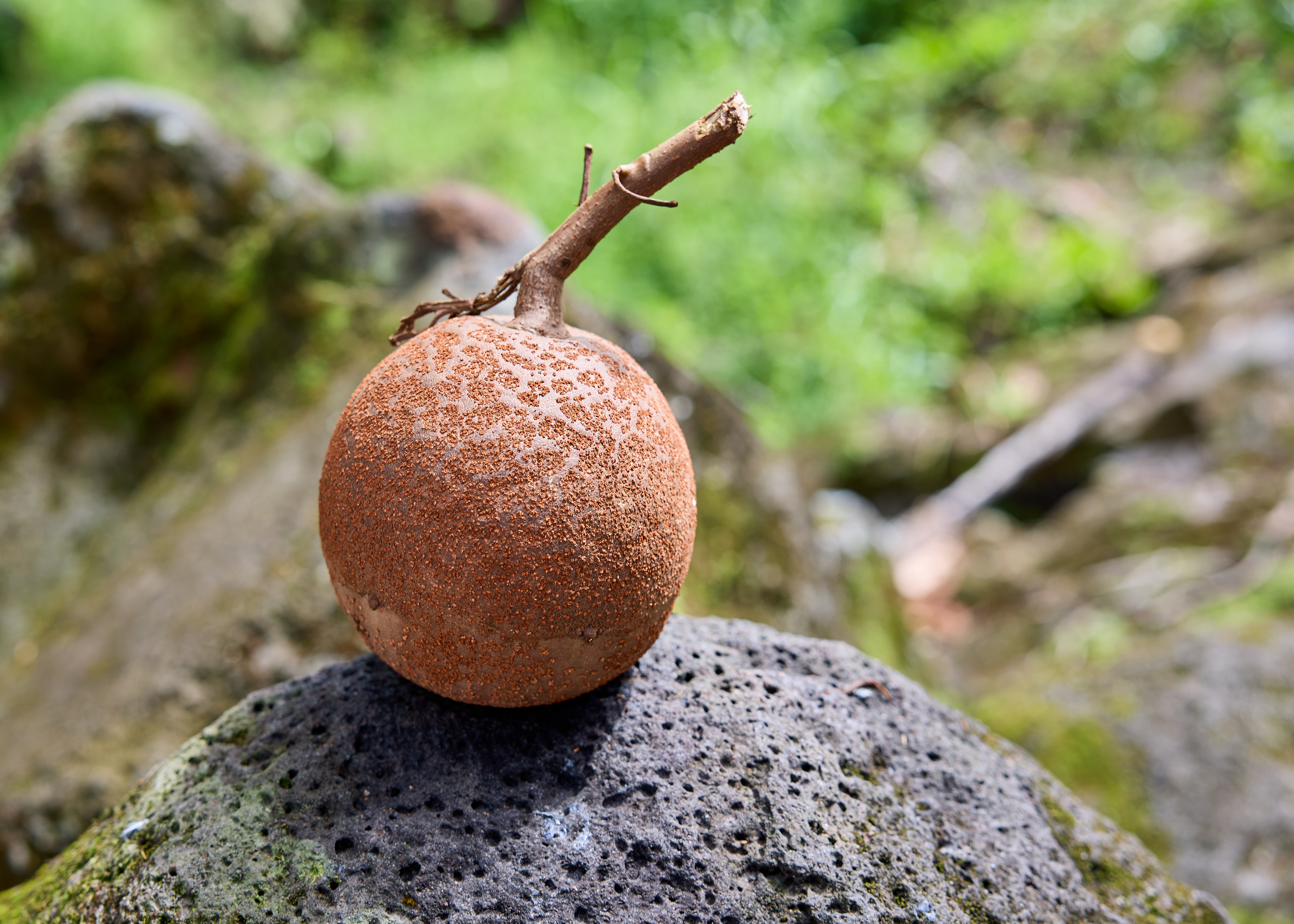
Fruit at Waimea Botanical Garden on the island of O'ahu, Hawaiʻi

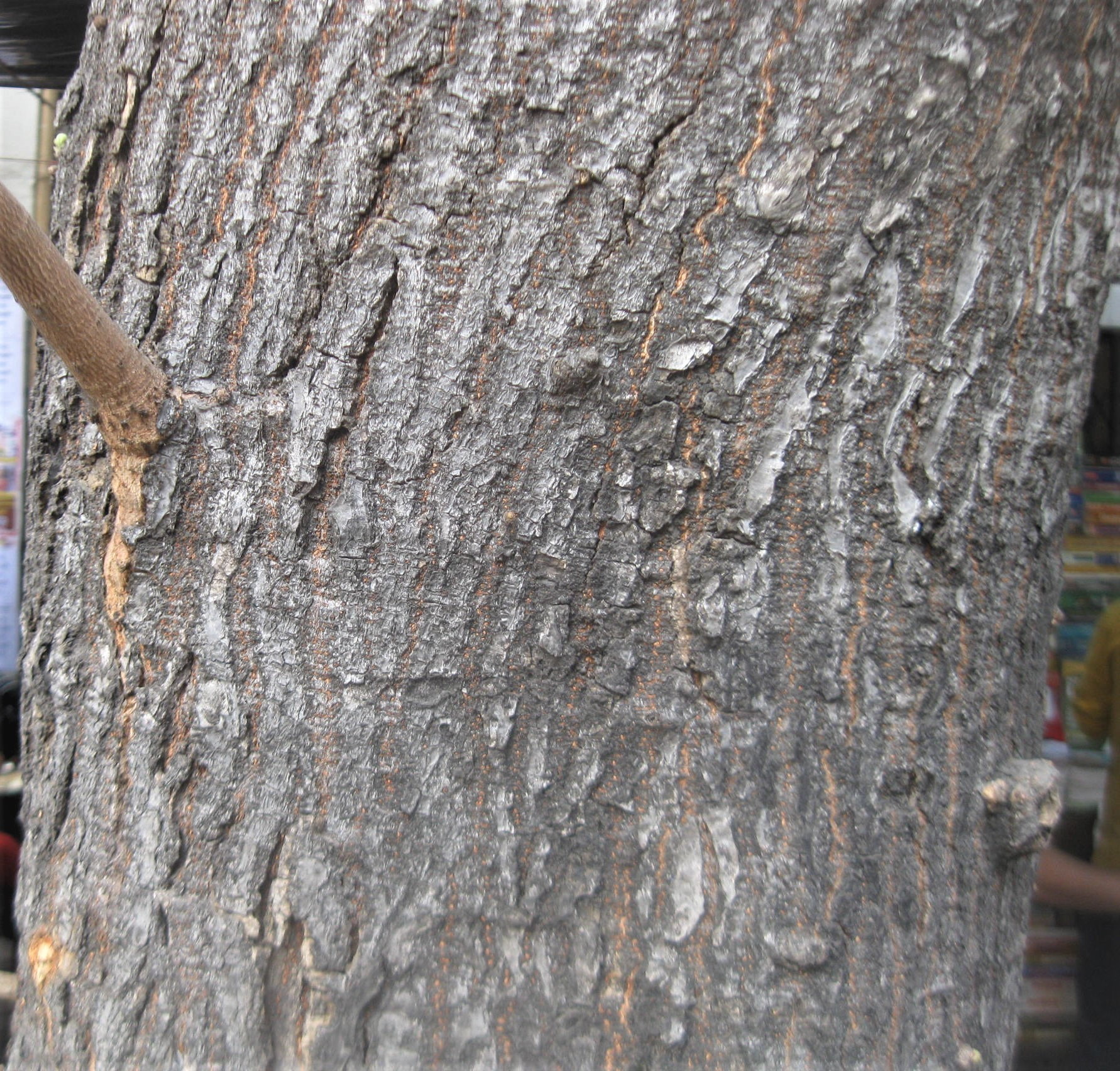
Tree trunk (Kolkata, India)
