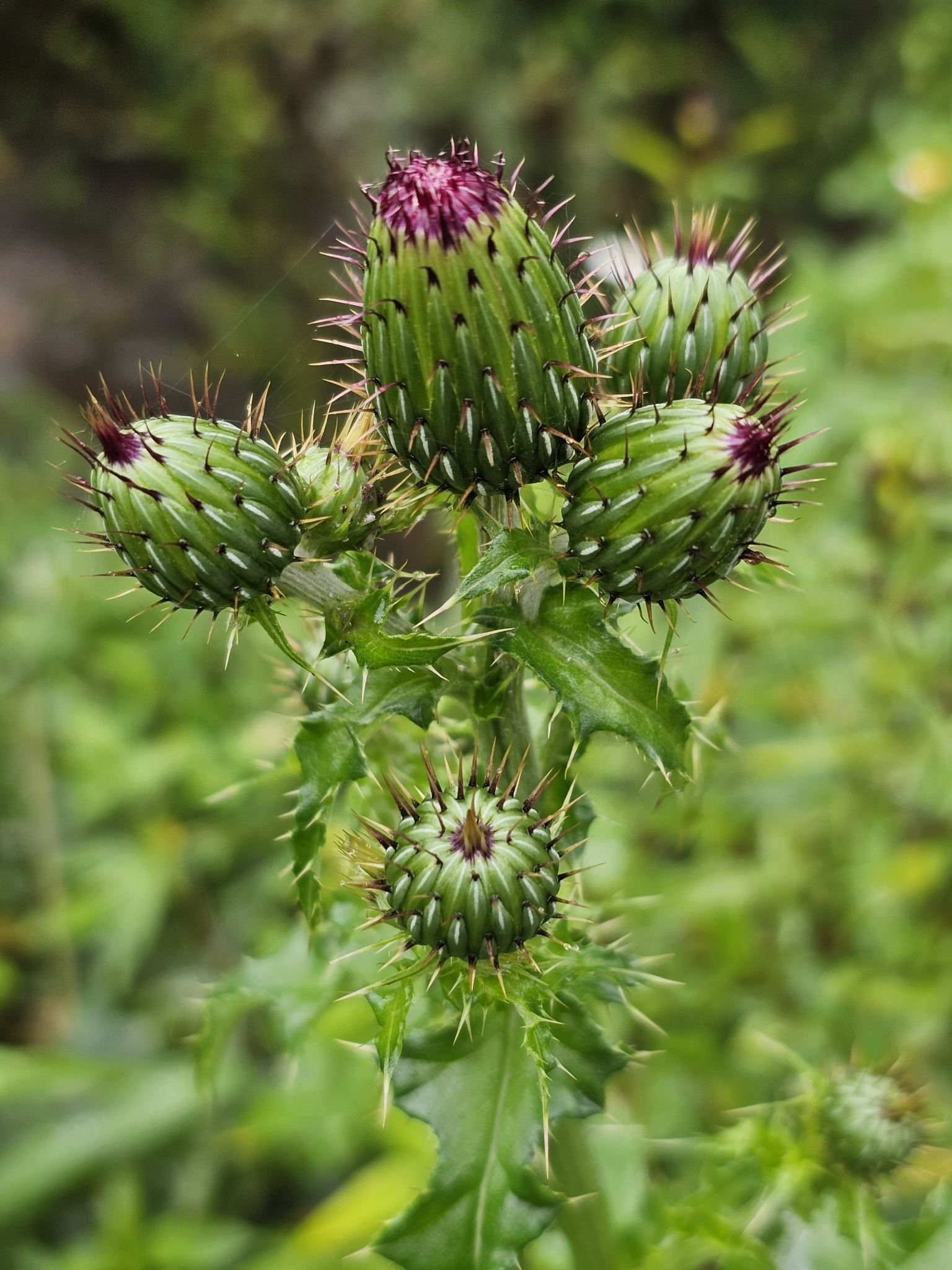

Scientific classification
- Kingdom: Plantae
- Clade: Tracheophytes
- Clade: Angiosperms
- Clade: Eudicots
- Clade: Asterids
- Order: Asterales
- Family: Asteraceae
- Genus: Cirsium
- Species: C. mexicanum

Binomial name
- Cirsium mexicanum DC.

Synonyms
- Carduus lanceolatus var. arachnoideo-lanuginosus M.Gómez; Carduus mexicanus Moric. ex DC.; Cirsium costaricense (Pol.) Petr.; Cirsium mexicanum var. bracteatum Petr.; Cirsium portoricense (Kuntze) Petr.; Cnicus costaricensis Pol.; Cnicus mexicanus (DC.) Hemsl.; Cnicus portoricensis Kuntze

= Cirsium mexicanum =

Species of thistle

Cirsium mexicanum is a Mesoamerican and Caribbean species of plants in the tribe Cardueae within the family Asteraceae. Its common name is Mexican thistle. It is widespread across Mexico (Tamaulipas, Durango, Jalisco, Puebla, Hidalgo, Veracruz, Tabasco, Oaxaca, Chiapas, Yucatán Peninsula), Central America (all 7 countries) and the West Indies (Cuba, Hispaniola, Puerto Rico).
