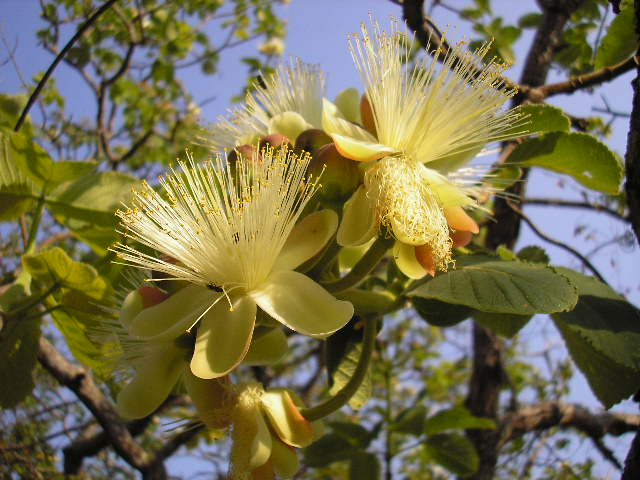
- Caryocar brasiliense

Scientific classification
- Kingdom: Plantae
- Clade: Tracheophytes
- Clade: Angiosperms
- Clade: Eudicots
- Clade: Rosids
- Order: Malpighiales
- Family: Caryocaraceae; Voigt

Genera
- Anthodiscus; Caryocar

= Caryocaraceae =

Family of flowering plants

Caryocaraceae (syn. Rhizobolaceae DC.) is a small family of flowering plants consisting of two genera with 26 species. The family is native to tropical regions of Central and South America, as well as the West Indies.
