= Galearieae =

Obsolete tribe of flowering plants

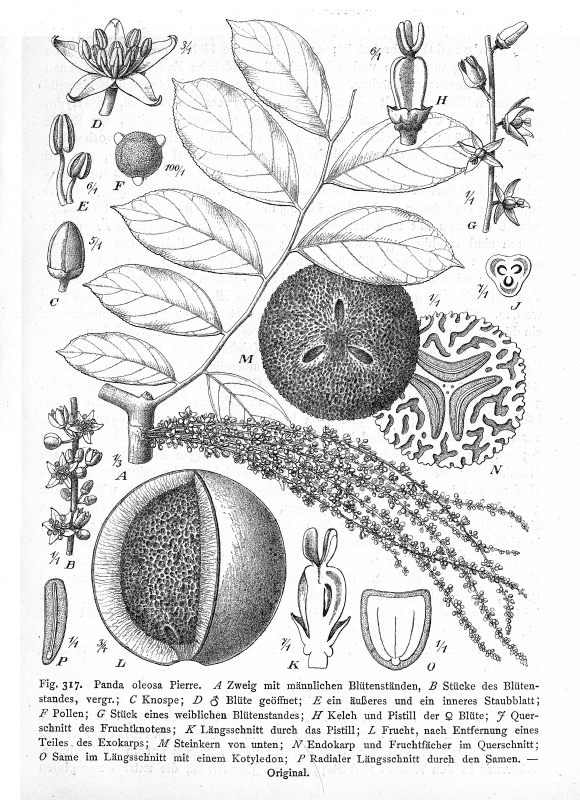
Drawing of the panda oleosa species, once considered part of the galearieae tribe.

Galearieae is a no-longer-recognized tribe of plant of the family Euphorbiaceae. It comprised 3 genera, Galearia, Microdesmis, and Panda. Molecular data show that although these three genera are related to each other, they do not belong to the subfamily Acalyphoideae of the Euphorbiaceae, and therefore they are generally now classified as the family Pandaceae.

== See also ==
- Taxonomy of the Euphorbiaceae
