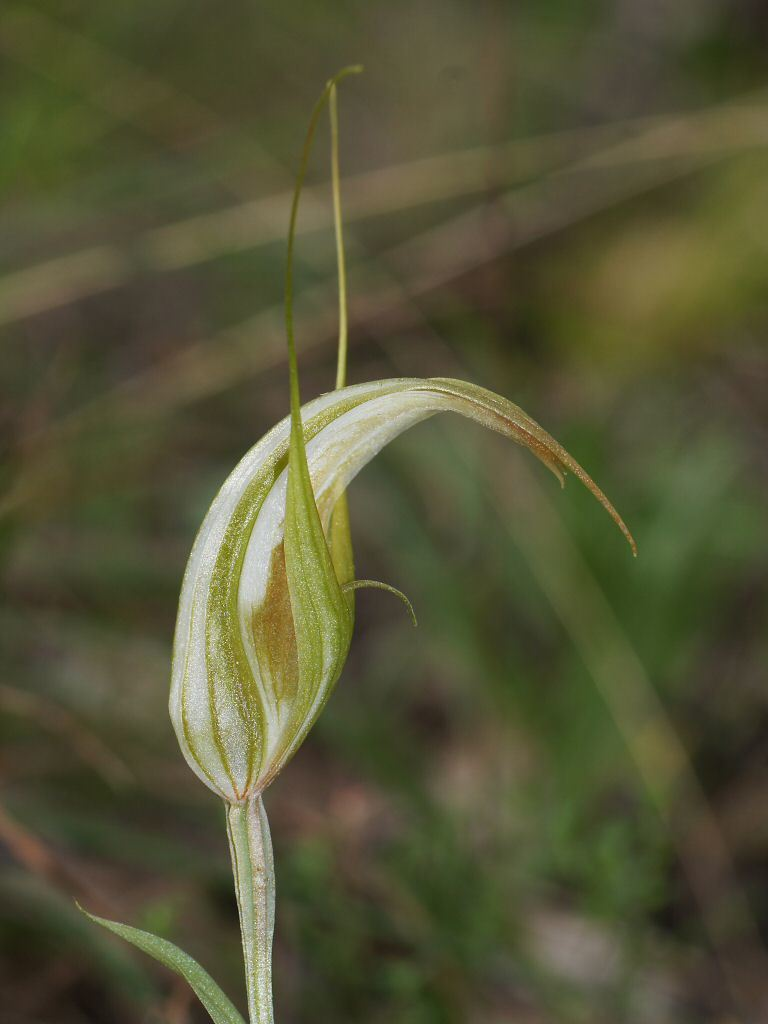
- Near Suggan Buggan

Scientific classification
- Kingdom: Plantae
- Clade: Tracheophytes
- Clade: Angiosperms
- Clade: Monocots
- Order: Asparagales
- Family: Orchidaceae
- Subfamily: Orchidoideae
- Tribe: Cranichideae
- Genus: Pterostylis
- Species: P. ampliata

Binomial name
- Pterostylis ampliata (D.L.Jones) D.L.Jones

Synonyms
- Diplodium ampliatum D.L.Jones

= Pterostylis ampliata =

Species of orchid

Pterostylis ampliata, commonly known as the large autumn greenhood, is a species of greenhood orchid endemic to eastern Australia. It is similar in appearance to Pterostylis revoluta, a related species restricted to Queensland and New South Wales.

== Description ==
Pterostylis ampliata is a herbaceous terrestrial orchid with a basal rosette of 3–4 ovate or oblong leaves. When flowering, this basal rosette dies back, and a single large, forward-leaning flower appears on a stalk measuring up to 25 cm (9.8 in) tall. The flower is primarily green and white striped with some suffuse red-brown colouration and a sickle-shaped galea, measuring 4.5–7 cm (1.8–2.8 in) long. Flowering occurs from February to June, depending on location.

== Distribution and habitat ==
Pterostylis ampliata is a widespread species occurring in Queensland, New South Wales, Australian Capital Territory, and Victoria. It is most common in drier inland areas and rarer near the coast, growing primarily in sclerophyll forest and woodland where well-draining soils are present. It is capable of growing on ridges, slopes, and flats, often on bare, skeletal soil.

== Taxonomy and naming ==
David L. Jones initially described Pterostylis ampliata under the name Diplodium ampliatum in 2019 based on a type specimen collected in 1989 from Conimbla National Park, New South Wales. The specific epithet was derived from the Latin word ampliatus, meaning 'enlarged', in reference to the species' larger flowers when compared with those of Pterostylis revoluta. Later that year the name was changed from Diplodium ampliatum to Pterostylis ampliata, also by Jones. Earlier publications which recognised this species as being separate from P. revoluta often referred to it by the name Pterostylis sp. aff. revoluta, in reference to its similarity to P. revoluta.
