= B. indica =

B. indica may refer to:

- Bandicota indica, the greater bandicoot rat, a species of rodent in the family Muridae
- Beijerinckia indica, a species of aerobic bacteria
- Bhesa indica, a species of flowering tree
- Bruxanelia indica, a member of the coffee family
- Buddleja indica, a species of evergreen shrub

== Synonyms ==
- Balanites indica, a synonym for Balanites roxburghii, a spiny, evergreen tree
- Bignonia indica, a synonym for Oroxylum indicum, the Indian trumpet flower tree
- Bitrimonospora indica, a synonym for Monosporascus eutypoides

== See also ==
- Indica (disambiguation)
