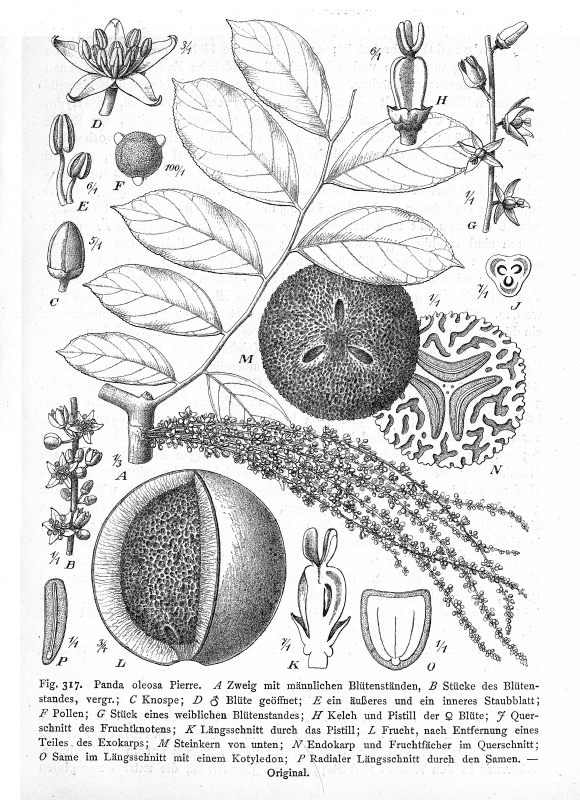
- Panda oleosa

Scientific classification
- Kingdom: Plantae
- Clade: Tracheophytes
- Clade: Angiosperms
- Clade: Eudicots
- Clade: Rosids
- Order: Malpighiales
- Family: Pandaceae; Engl. & Gilg

Genera
- See text

= Pandaceae =

Family of flowering plants

The family Pandaceae consists of three genera that were formerly classified as the tribe Galearieae in the subfamily Acalyphoideae of family Euphorbiaceae. Those are:

- Galearia
- Microdesmis
- Panda

These genera contain 17 species, which especially live in West Africa or Southeast Asia.

Species in this family are dioecious trees or shrubs, with alternate, simple leaves.

The genus Centroplacus was formerly included in the Pandaceae and had also been recognized in the tribe Centroplaceae of family Phyllanthaceae. The APG III system recognized this genus as a part of the family Centroplacaceae.
