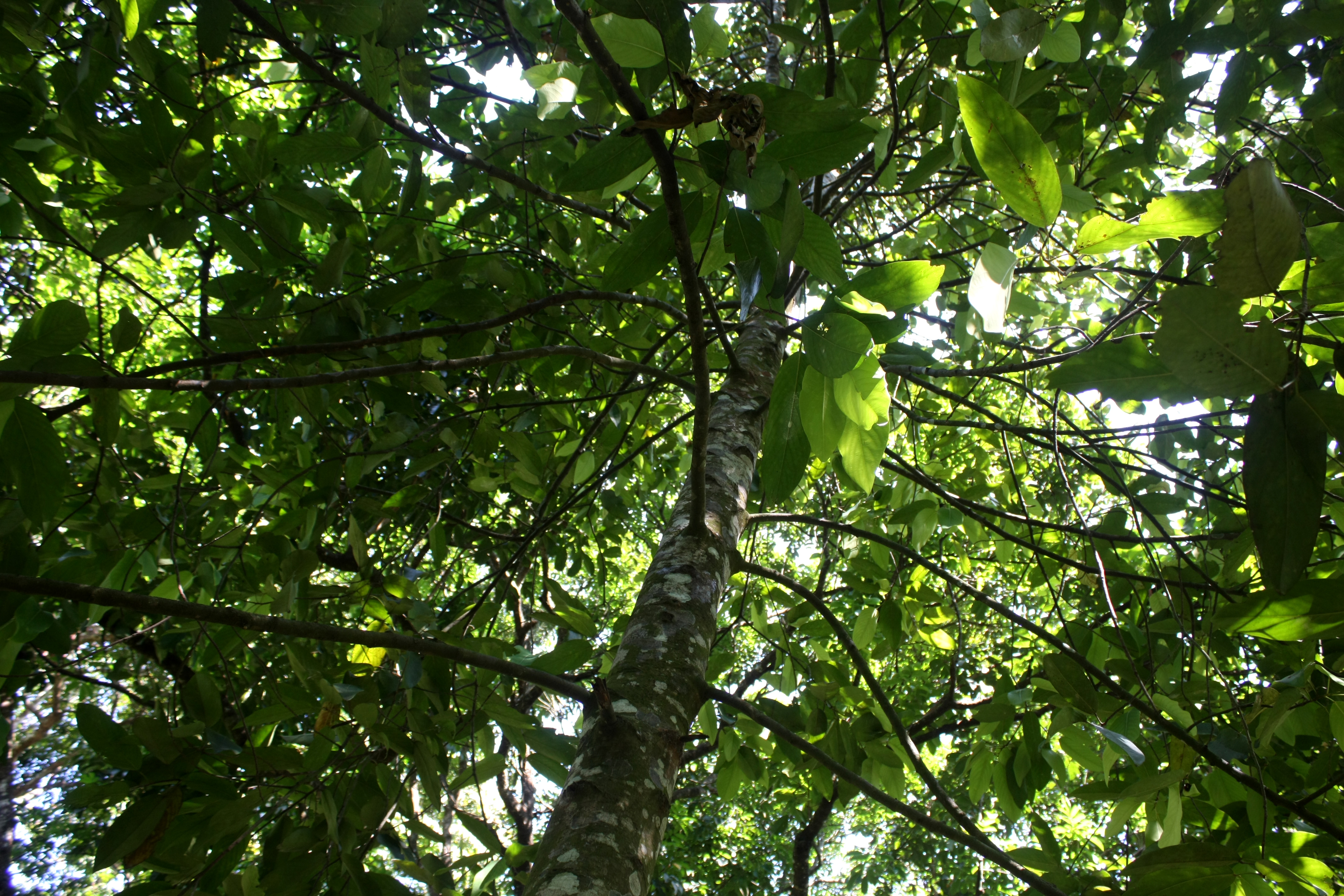

Conservation status
- Vulnerable (IUCN 2.3)

Scientific classification
- Kingdom: Plantae
- Clade: Tracheophytes
- Clade: Angiosperms
- Clade: Eudicots
- Clade: Rosids
- Order: Malpighiales
- Family: Centroplacaceae
- Genus: Bhesa
- Species: B. ceylanica

Binomial name
- Bhesa ceylanica (Arn.) Ding Hou

= Bhesa ceylanica =

Species of flowering plant

Bhesa ceylanica is a species of plant in the family Centroplacaceae. It is endemic to Sri Lanka.
