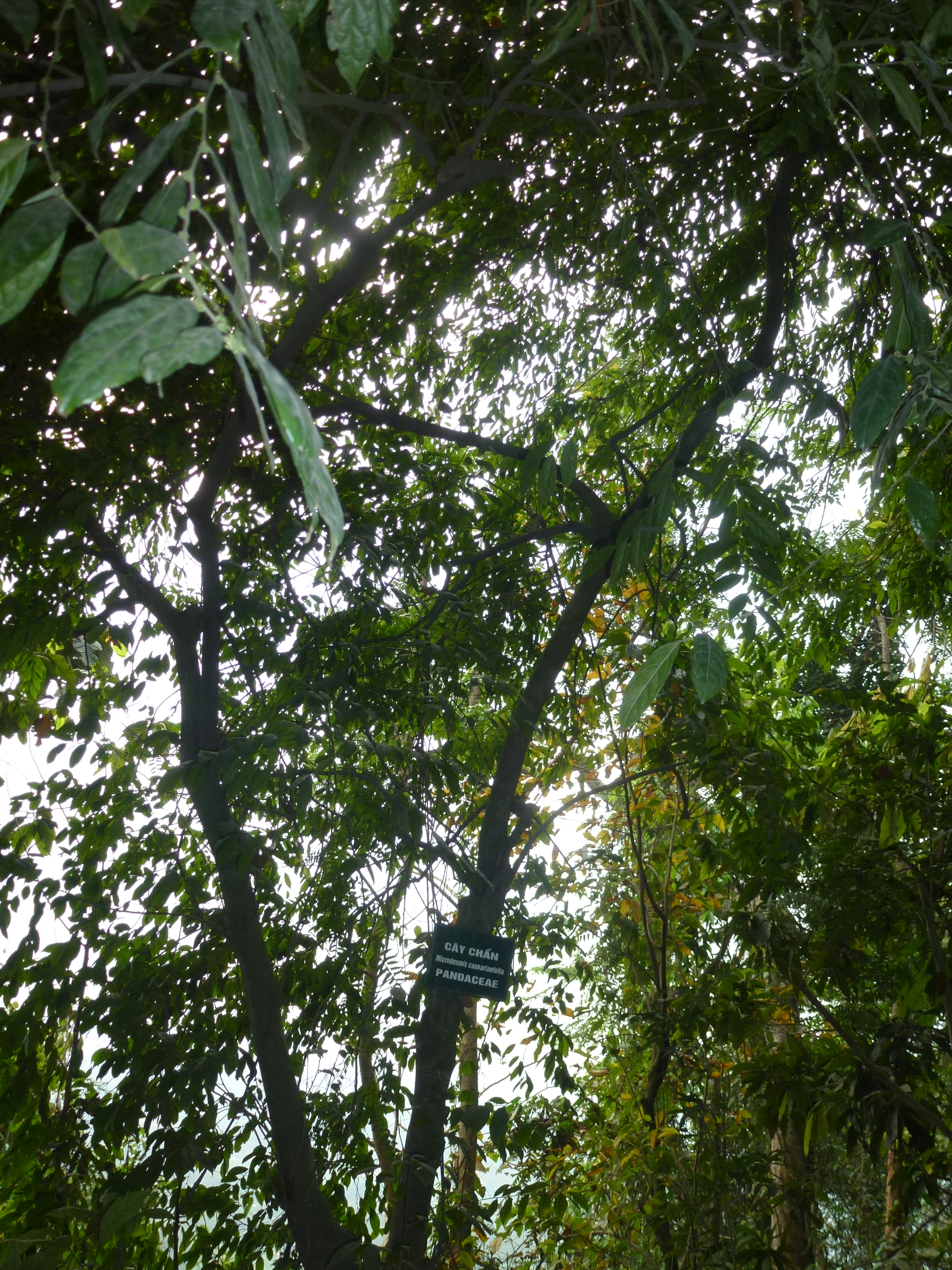

Conservation status
- Least Concern (IUCN 3.1)

Scientific classification
- Kingdom: Plantae
- Clade: Tracheophytes
- Clade: Angiosperms
- Clade: Eudicots
- Clade: Rosids
- Order: Malpighiales
- Family: Pandaceae
- Genus: Microdesmis
- Species: M. caseariifolia

Binomial name
- Microdesmis caseariifolia Planch. ex Hook.

= Microdesmis caseariifolia =

Species of flowering plant

Microdesmis caseariifolia is a plant in the family Pandaceae. It is found in Bangladesh, Myanmar, Cambodia, Indonesia, Laos, Malaysia, Philippines, Vietnam. Leaf colour is green. Flower colour is yellow.
