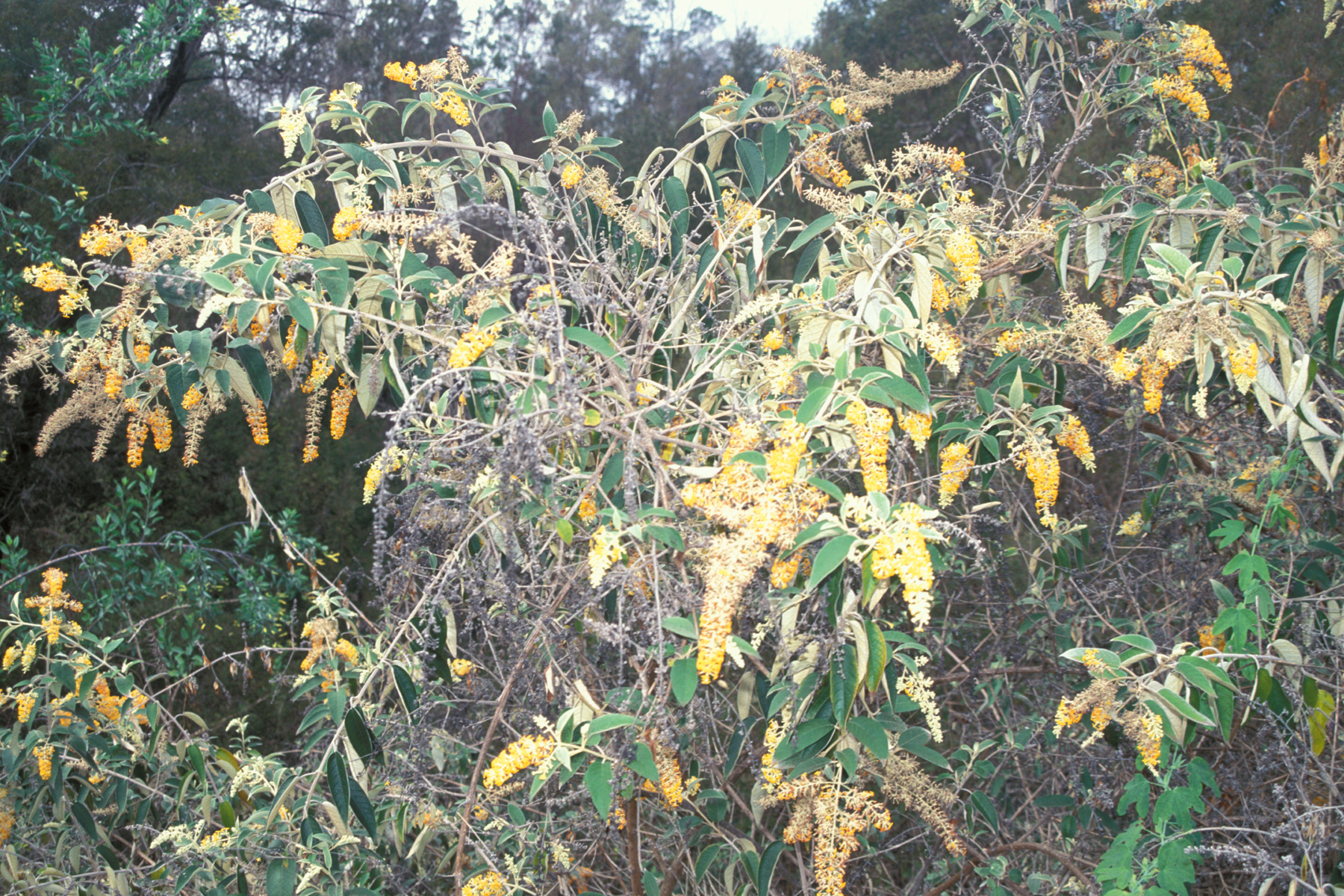
- Buddleja madagascariensis in Hawaii

Scientific classification
- Kingdom: Plantae
- Clade: Tracheophytes
- Clade: Angiosperms
- Clade: Eudicots
- Clade: Asterids
- Order: Lamiales
- Family: Scrophulariaceae
- Genus: Buddleja
- Species: B. madagascariensis

Binomial name
- Buddleja madagascariensis Lam.

Synonyms
- Buddleja heterophylla Lindl.; Nicodemia madagascariensis (Lam.) Parker

= Buddleja madagascariensis =

Species of flowering plant

Buddleja madagascariensis, the smokebush or Madagascan butterfly bush, is a species of flowering plant in the figwort family Scrophulariaceae. It is a substantial evergreen shrub with fragrant yellow flowers through autumn and winter.

== Description ==
Buddleja madagascariensis makes a sparse, lax shrub < 4 metres (13 ft) in height. The dark green leaves are opposite, narrowly ovate, < 12 cm long, with petioles < 2 cm long, the surface bearing impressed reticulate venation, and densely pubescent. The fragrant flowers form slender terminal panicles < 25 centimetres (9.8 in) long, and range in colour from deep yellow, through orange, to pink.

It is endemic to Madagascar, where it grows amongst scrub on mountain slopes to elevations of 600–2,000 metres (2,000–6,600 ft).

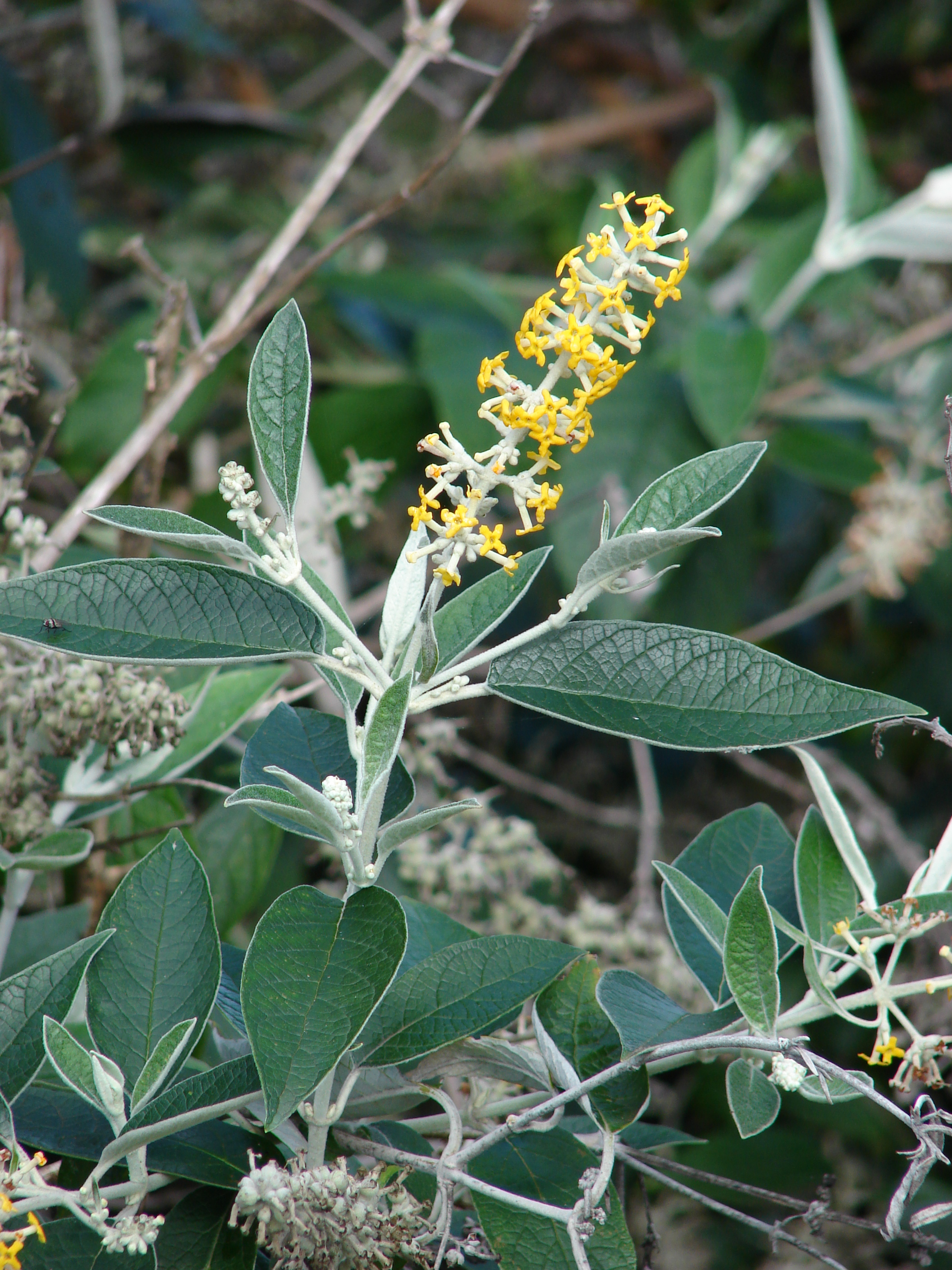
Inflorescence and leaves

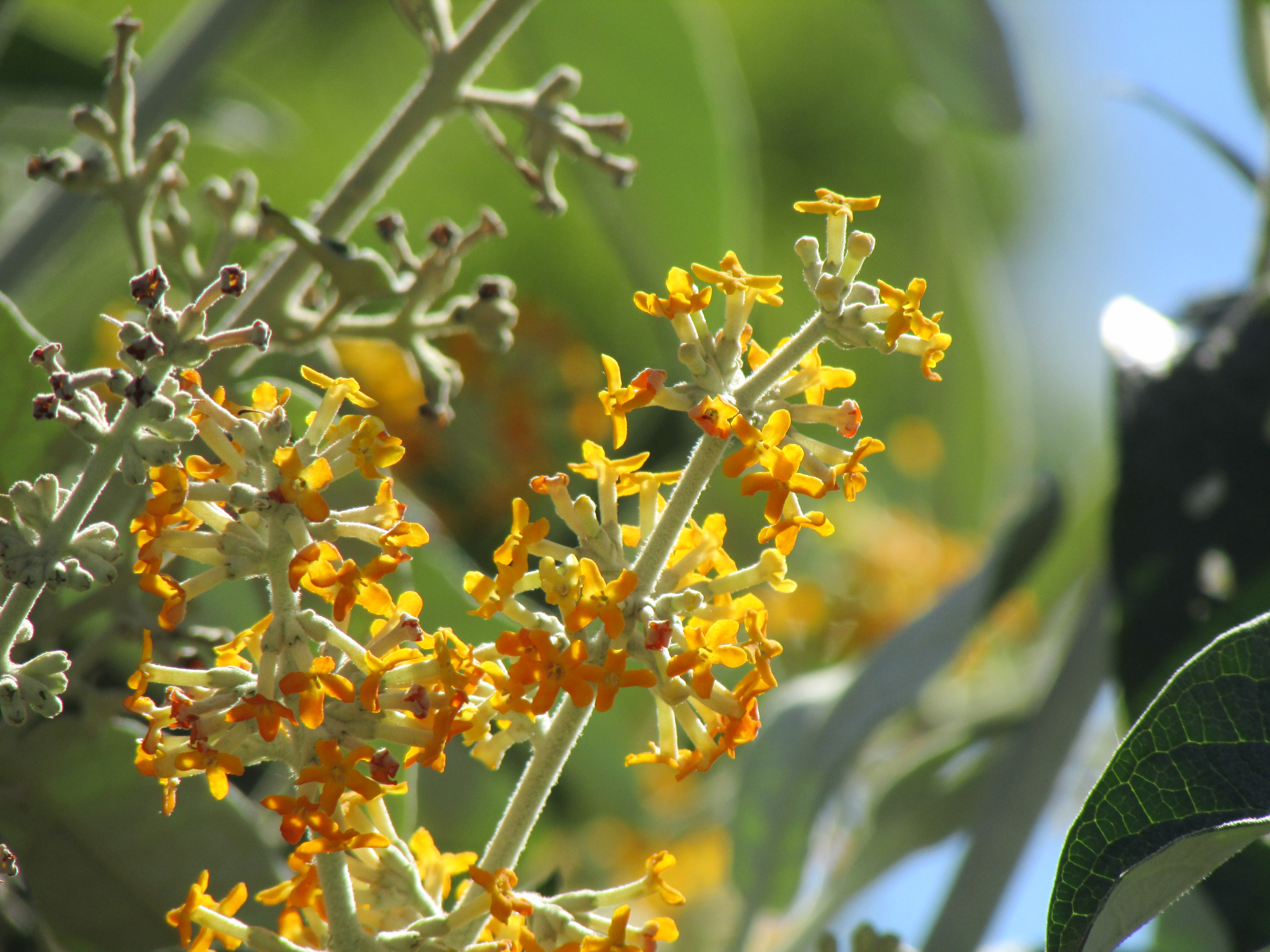
Flower close-up

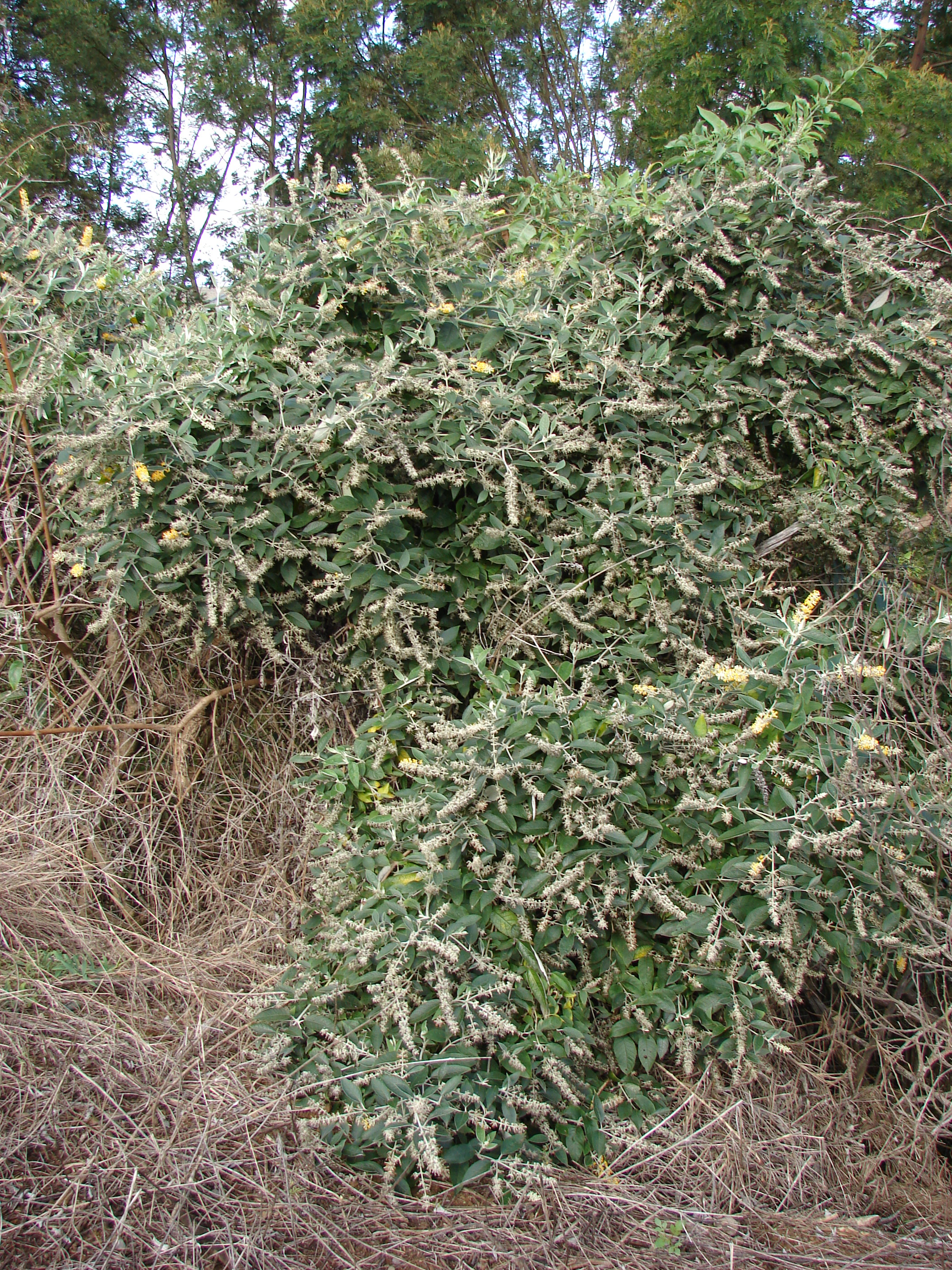
Form as shrub

== Cultivation ==
The species was first named and described by Lamarck in 1792, and introduced to cultivation in 1827. It was listed by Masters in his Hortus duroverni Canterbury nursery catalogue of 1831 (as B. heterophylla).

Buddleja madagascariensis is cultivated as an ornamental plant. Intolerant of sub-zero (< 32 °F) temperatures, it can only reliably be grown outdoors in subtropical and tropical climate gardens, such as those of Southern California and Florida in the US, although in temperate coastal regions it can survive on south-facing walls, with added winter frost protection. Elsewhere, it is essentially a conservatory and greenhouse plant. The shrub is grown under glass as part of the NCCPG National Collection of Buddleja held by the Longstock Park Nursery, near Stockbridge, Hampshire, England. Hardiness: RHS H2, USDA zones 9 – 10.

The shrub was accorded the Award of Garden Merit by the Royal Horticultural Society (record 688) in 2002.

=== Naturalised species ===
Popular around the world as an ornamental, B. madagascariensis has widely naturalized and is now classified as an invasive species in Hawaii; it can also be found growing wild in southern China, and along the Mediterranean coast of France.

=== Hybrids ===
The species Buddleja madagascariensis was crossed with Buddleja asiatica to create the hybrid cultivars Buddleja 'Lewisiana' and 'Margaret Pike'. It was also found to have naturally hybridized with Buddleja indica in the Grand Bassin of Réunion, an island 200 kilometres (120 mi) east of Madagascar
