= Bhesa nitidissima =

Conservation status
- Critically Endangered (IUCN 2.3)

Scientific classification
- Kingdom: Plantae
- Clade: Tracheophytes
- Clade: Angiosperms
- Clade: Eudicots
- Clade: Rosids
- Order: Malpighiales
- Family: Centroplacaceae
- Genus: Bhesa
- Species: B. nitidissima

Binomial name
- Bhesa nitidissima Kosterm.

Species of flowering plant

Bhesa nitidissima is a species of flowering plant in the Centroplacaceae family. It is a tree endemic to Sri Lanka.

The species was first described by André Joseph Guillaume Henri Kostermans in 1977.

== Description ==
A tree with an average height of 20–30 meters (66–98 ft) but can reach as high as 50 meters (160 feet). Bark is usually dark brown and deeply cracked on older specimens. The unique feature of the Bhesa genus within the Centroplacaceae family is its geniculate petioles; which essentially means that the leaf bends sharply away from the stalk. The petiole usually contains three vascular bundles. Seed germination is epigeal. Produces 3-4mm wide, greenish to white sessile flowers with 5 petals. The flowers produce greenish brown, oblong seeds encased in a thick gelatinous aril inside capsules up to 2.2 cm long.

== Ecology ==
Endemic to Sri Lanka. Found mostly in low elevation wet zone forests, but have a recorded range of up to 1,600 meters (5,200 feet). The tree flowers September through October and produces fruit November through December. Although listed as critically endangered in 1998, a 2017 handbook of Sri Lankan flora suggests the tree is now quite common.

== Uses ==
The arils of Bhesa are a known human food source. The tree is occasionally used for timber. Extracts from this genus are used in traditional medicine, to cure vomiting and diarrhea.
