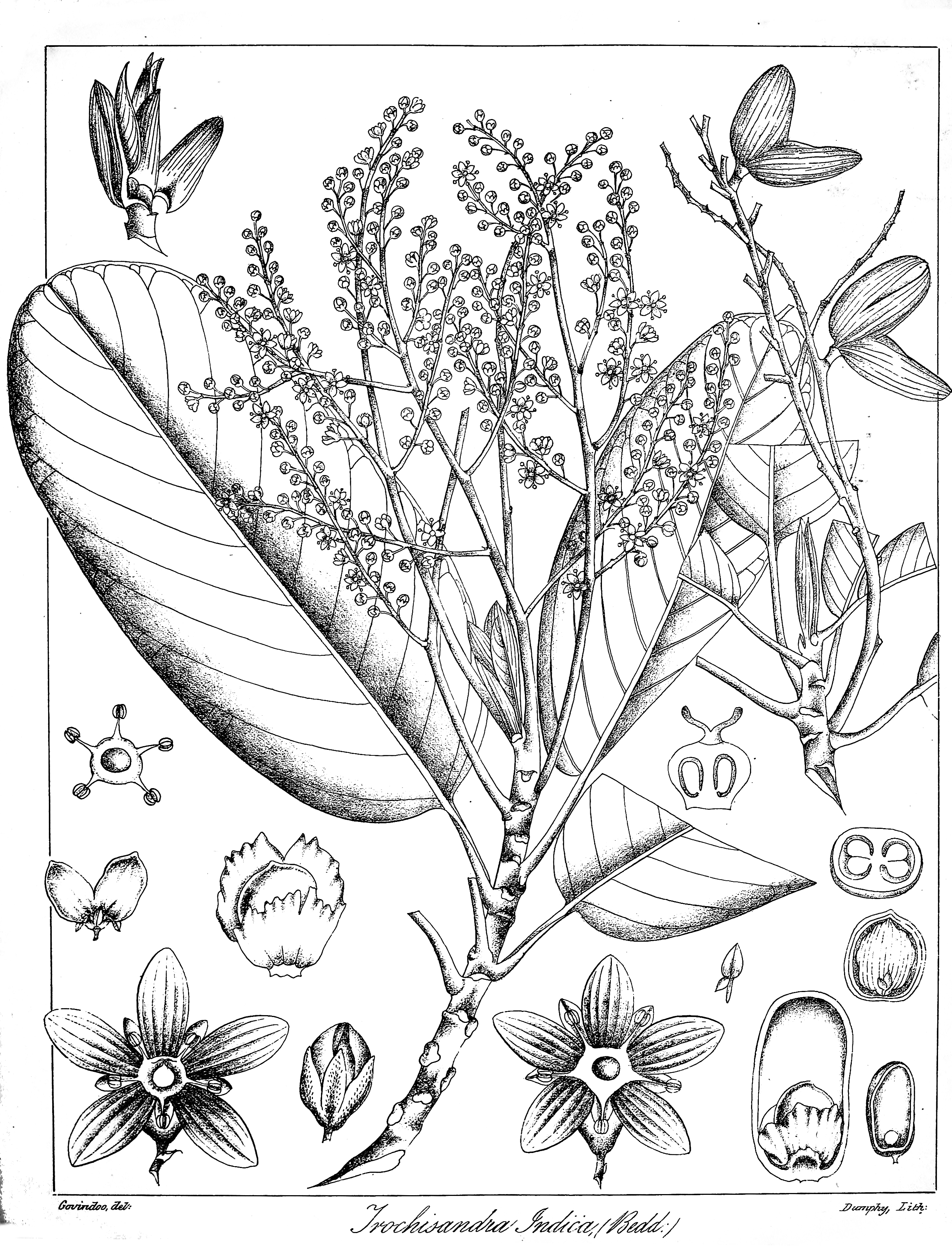
- Bhesa indica

Scientific classification
- Kingdom: Plantae
- Clade: Tracheophytes
- Clade: Angiosperms
- Clade: Eudicots
- Clade: Rosids
- Order: Malpighiales
- Family: Centroplacaceae
- Genus: Bhesa
- Species: B. indica

Binomial name
- Bhesa indica (Bedd.) Ding Hou

= Bhesa indica =

Species of flowering plant

Bhesa indica is a flowering plant tree species in the Centroplacaceae family. It is distributed along the tropical wet evergreen forests of the Western Ghats of India. It is considered synonymous with Bhesa paniculata by some authors.

== Taxonomy ==
Bhesa indica has been considered as synonymous with Trochisandra indica, Kurrimia bipartita, Kurrimia indica, and Kurrimia paniculata. Other authors have distinguished Indian from Malayan species. Brandis noted that Trochisandra indica Bedd., reported from 3–6,000 feet in the Anamalai hills of the Western Ghats, should be referred to the southern Indian species, Kurrimia bipartita M.A.Lawson, instead of the Malayan species, K. paniculata Wall., as quoted by Lawson. The two species were also distinguished by Ding Hou on the basis of flower and fruit characters. The flowers of the two species differ in that Bhesa paniculata has solitary, paniculate inflorescence with deeply 5-lobed disk, extrorse anthers, and ovary with a tuft of hairs on top. B. indica has disk entire, anthers introrse, and glabrous ovary. In fruits, both species are characterized by paniculate infructescence and 2-lobed fruits with distinct pedicels, but the fruits are obovoid or cordate, 1-1.75 (up to 2) cm long and acute to attenuate at the base in B. paniculata, and oblong, 2.5–3 cm long and obtuse at the base in B. indica.

== Distribution ==
Considered together Bhesa indica and Bhesa paniculata are distributed in parts of southern India, Thailand, Malay peninsula, Indonesia, Borneo, and the Philippines. Bhesa indica is known from southern India, mainly from the Western Ghats, while B. paniculata extends also into parts of south-east Asia. Bhesa indica occurs along the Western Ghats from the Agasthyamalai hills in the south to the Anaimalai hills in the states of Tamil Nadu and Kerala, mainly in the evergreen forests from around 900 m to 1800 m.

== Characteristics ==
Evergreen trees of mature forest growing up to 30 m tall, with smooth, grey-brown bark. The branchlets are stout and cylindrical and carry scars of fallen leaves and stipules. The leaves are simple, alternate and clustered at twig ends, with large stipules up to 2.5 cm long that are caducous (lost through dehiscence). The petiole is 2.5 cm to 4.5 cm long, swollen at the base and tip and attached to a leaf that is 10–18 cm long and 4.5-8.5 cm wide, elliptic-oblong to narrow-ovate in shape. The leaf apex is obtusely acute or short acuminate and the leaf base is rounded. The leaves are leathery, shining above and below, darker green above and paler below, and hairless. The leaves have 11 to 20 pairs of distinct secondary nerves (raised beneath, parallel, and oblique to midrib), with fine parallel and percurrent tertiary nerves. The inflorescence is at the ends of branches formed as panicled racemes. The flowers are small and white. The fruit is a capsule, red, and prominently 2-lobed. The fruit contains a single seed per lobe.

== Gallery ==
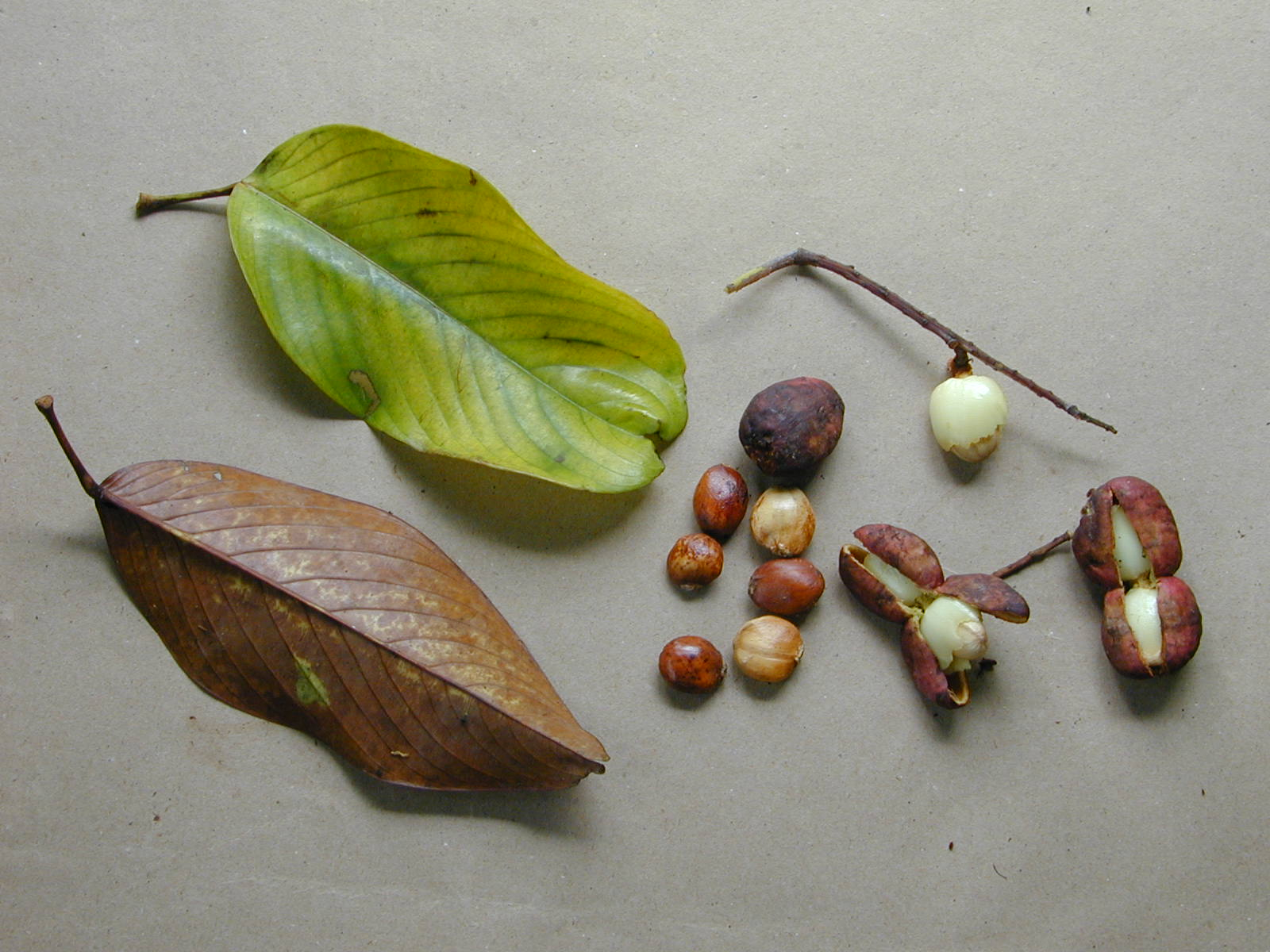
Bhesa indica leaves, fruits, and seeds

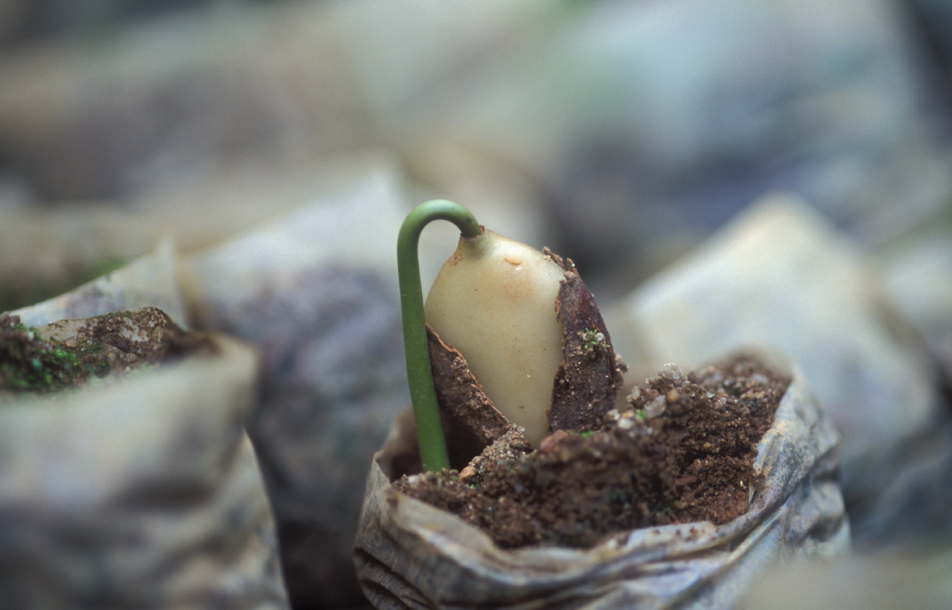
Bhesa indica seedling germinating

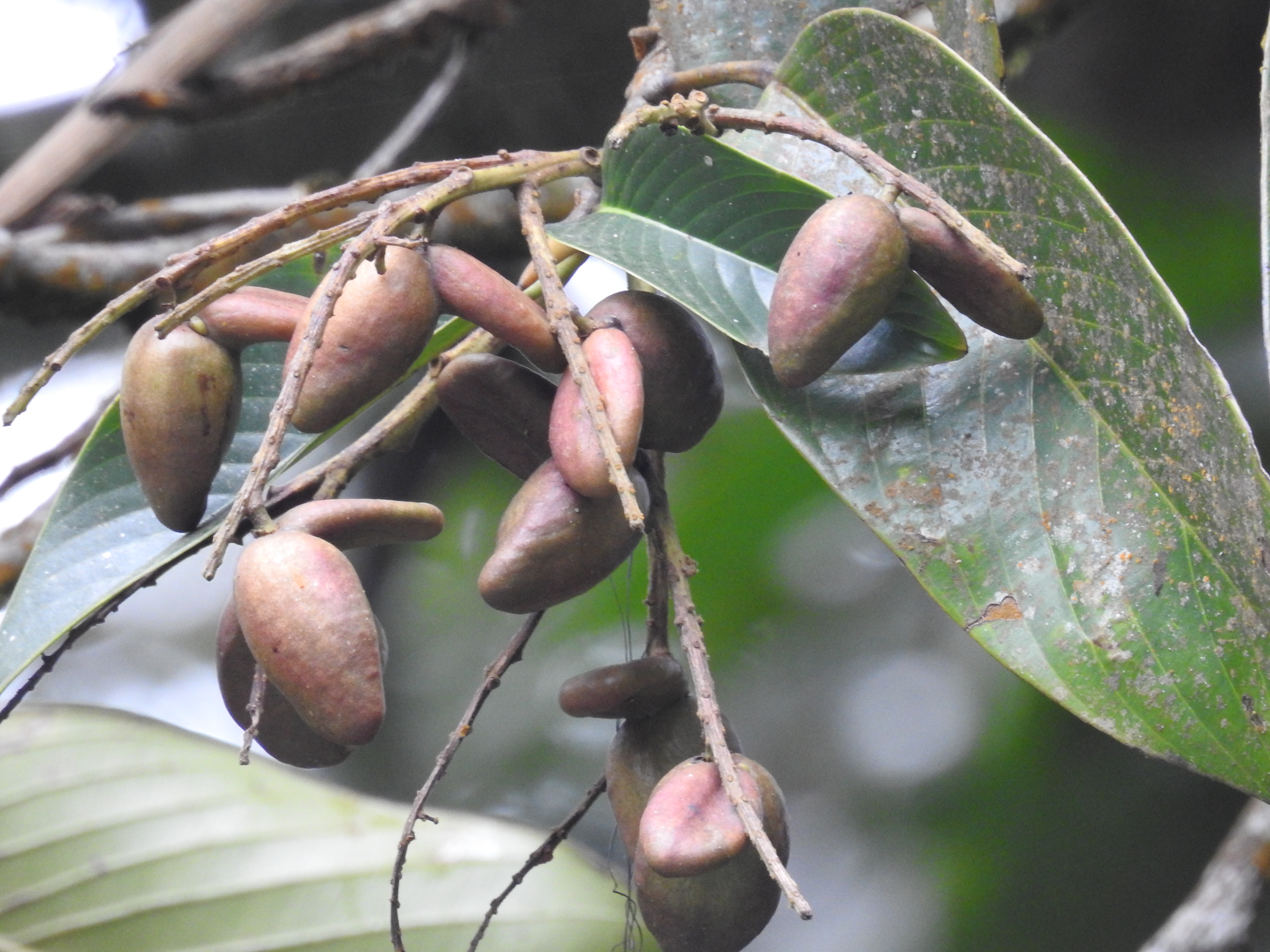
Bhesa indica fruiting branch

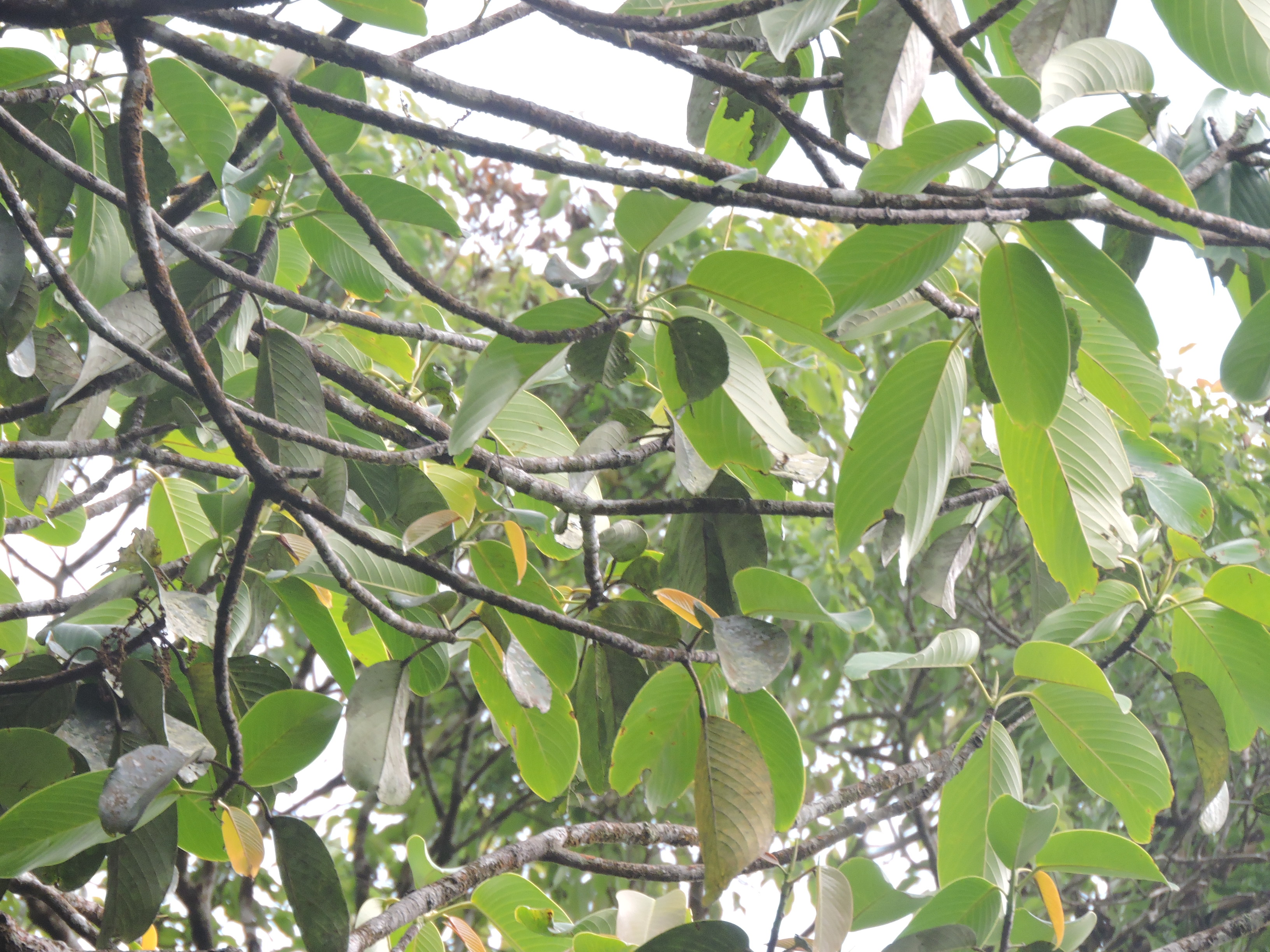
Leaves and branches

== Ecology ==
The tree is mostly restricted to mature evergreen forests in the Western Ghats, more common at elevations above 1000 m and less abundant in forest fragments. It is considered a species of relatively narrow ecological amplitude and a characteristic species of an identified high elevation (1400 – 1800 m) wet evergreen forest type called the Bhesa indica – Gomphandra coriacea – Litsea spp. Type in the southern Western Ghats. The fruits of Bhesa indica are dispersed by fruit bats and possibly other mammals such as macaques as in the case of other Bhesa species in south-east Asia and Sri Lanka. The seeds are recalcitrant, losing viability rapidly on drying (seed germination decreasing from 77% to 13% in a month).
