= B. robusta =

B. robusta may refer to:

- Bhesa robusta, a plant species found in India, Indonesia, Malaysia, Myanmar, Singapore, Thailand, Vietnam and possibly Bhutan
- Bolitoglossa robusta, a salamander species found in Costa Rica and Panama
- Buergeria robusta, a frog species endemic to Taiwan

== See also ==
- Robusta
