= Bhesa paniculata =

Conservation status
- Least Concern (IUCN 3.1)

Scientific classification
- Kingdom: Plantae
- Clade: Tracheophytes
- Clade: Angiosperms
- Clade: Eudicots
- Clade: Rosids
- Order: Malpighiales
- Family: Centroplacaceae
- Genus: Bhesa
- Species: B. paniculata

Binomial name
- Bhesa paniculata Arn.

Synonyms
- Kurrimia paniculata (Arn.) Wall. ex M.A.Lawson; Pyrospermum calophyllum Miq.

Species of flowering plant

Bhesa paniculata is a species of flowering plant in the Centroplacaceae family. It is a tree native to southern India, Myanmar, Peninsular Thailand, Peninsular Malaysia, Singapore, Borneo, Sumatra, and the Philippines.
