= Bhesa robusta =

Conservation status
- Least Concern (IUCN 3.1)

Scientific classification
- Kingdom: Plantae
- Clade: Tracheophytes
- Clade: Angiosperms
- Clade: Eudicots
- Clade: Rosids
- Order: Malpighiales
- Family: Centroplacaceae
- Genus: Bhesa
- Species: B. robusta

Binomial name
- Bhesa robusta (Roxb.) Ding Hou

Synonyms
- Bhesa moja Buch.-Ham.; Bhesa sinica (Hung T.Chang & S.Ye Liang) Hung T.Chang & S.Ye Liang; Celastrus robustus Roxb. (1824) (basionym); Kurrimia calophylla Wall.; Kurrimia pulcherrima Wall. ex M.A.Lawson; Kurrimia robusta (Roxb.) Kurz; Kurrimia robusta var. roxburghii Pierre; Kurrimia robusta var. thorelii Pierre; Kurrimia sinica Hung T.Chang & S.Ye Liang; Nothocnestis sumatrana Miq.; Sarcosperma tonkinense Lecomte

Species of flowering plant

Bhesa robusta is a species of plant in the Centroplacaceae family. It is a tree native to Indochina (Andaman Islands, Cambodia, Laos, Myanmar, Thailand, and Vietnam), southeastern China, Nepal and the eastern Himalayas, Bangladesh, Peninsular Malaysia, Sumatra, and Borneo. It is widespread in tropical and subtropical moist lowland forests, typically dipterocarp forests, up to 1,100 metres (3,610 ft) elevation.

The species was first described as Celastrus robustus by William Roxburgh in 1824. In 1958 Ding Hou placed the species in genus Bhesa as B. robusta.
