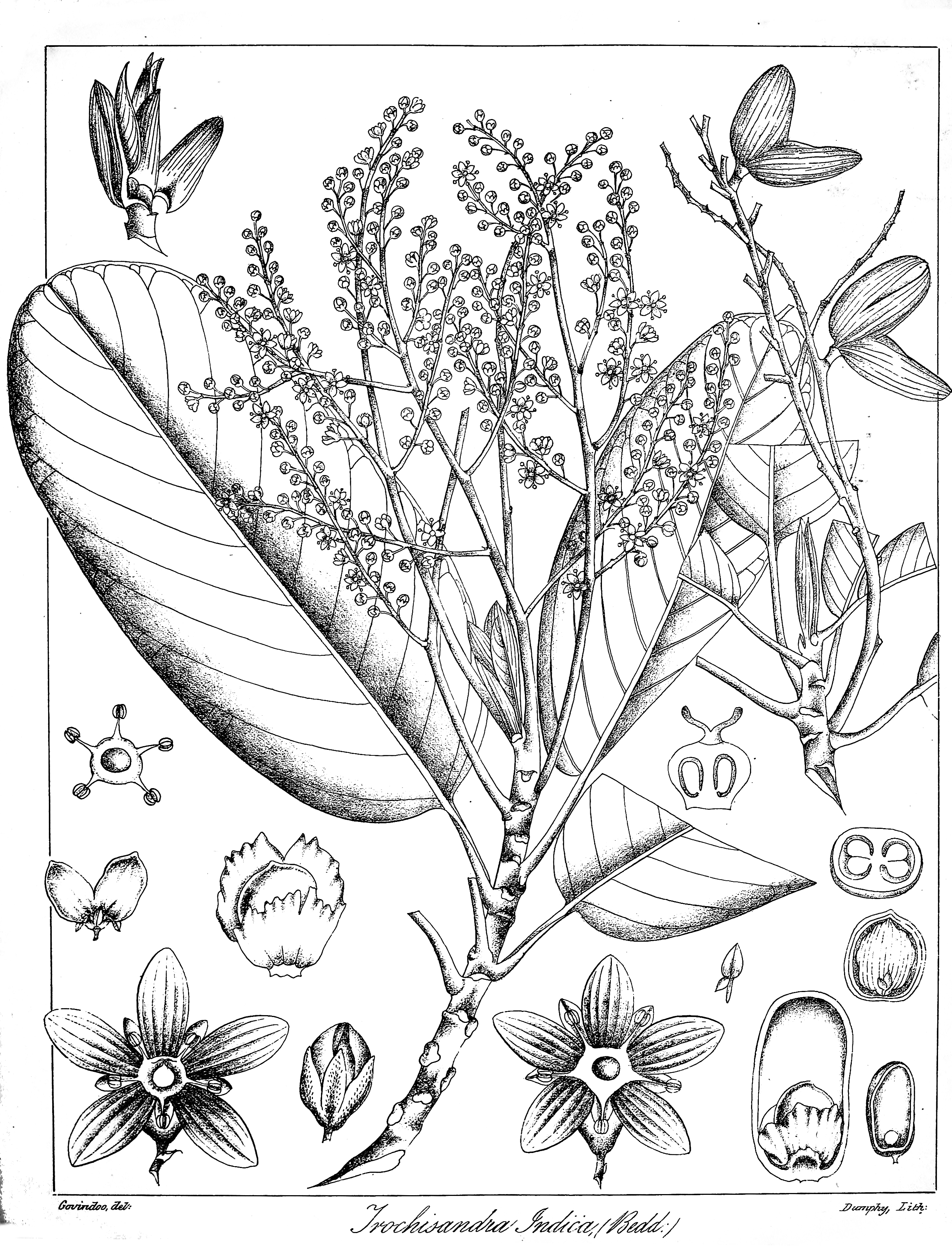
- Bhesa indica

Scientific classification
- Kingdom: Plantae
- Clade: Tracheophytes
- Clade: Angiosperms
- Clade: Eudicots
- Clade: Rosids
- Order: Malpighiales
- Family: Centroplacaceae
- Genus: Bhesa; Buch.-Ham. ex Arn.

= Bhesa =

Genus of plants

Bhesa is a small genus of woody plants in the family Centroplacaceae. Its natural distribution is from southern China to New Guinea. It was formerly classified in Celastraceae, until a molecular phylogenetic study placed it in the family Centroplacaceae in the order Malpighiales.

There are eight species:

- Bhesa andamanica N.Balach. & Chakrab.
- Bhesa archboldiana (Merr. & L.M.Perry) Ding Hou
- Bhesa ceylanica (Arn. ex Thwaites) Ding Hou
- Bhesa indica (Bedd.) Ding Hou
- Bhesa nitidissima Kosterm.
- Bhesa paniculata Arn.
- Bhesa robusta (Roxb.) Ding Hou
- Bhesa sinica (H.T.Chang & Liang) H.T.Chang & Liang
