= Galea (botany) =

Protective part of a flower

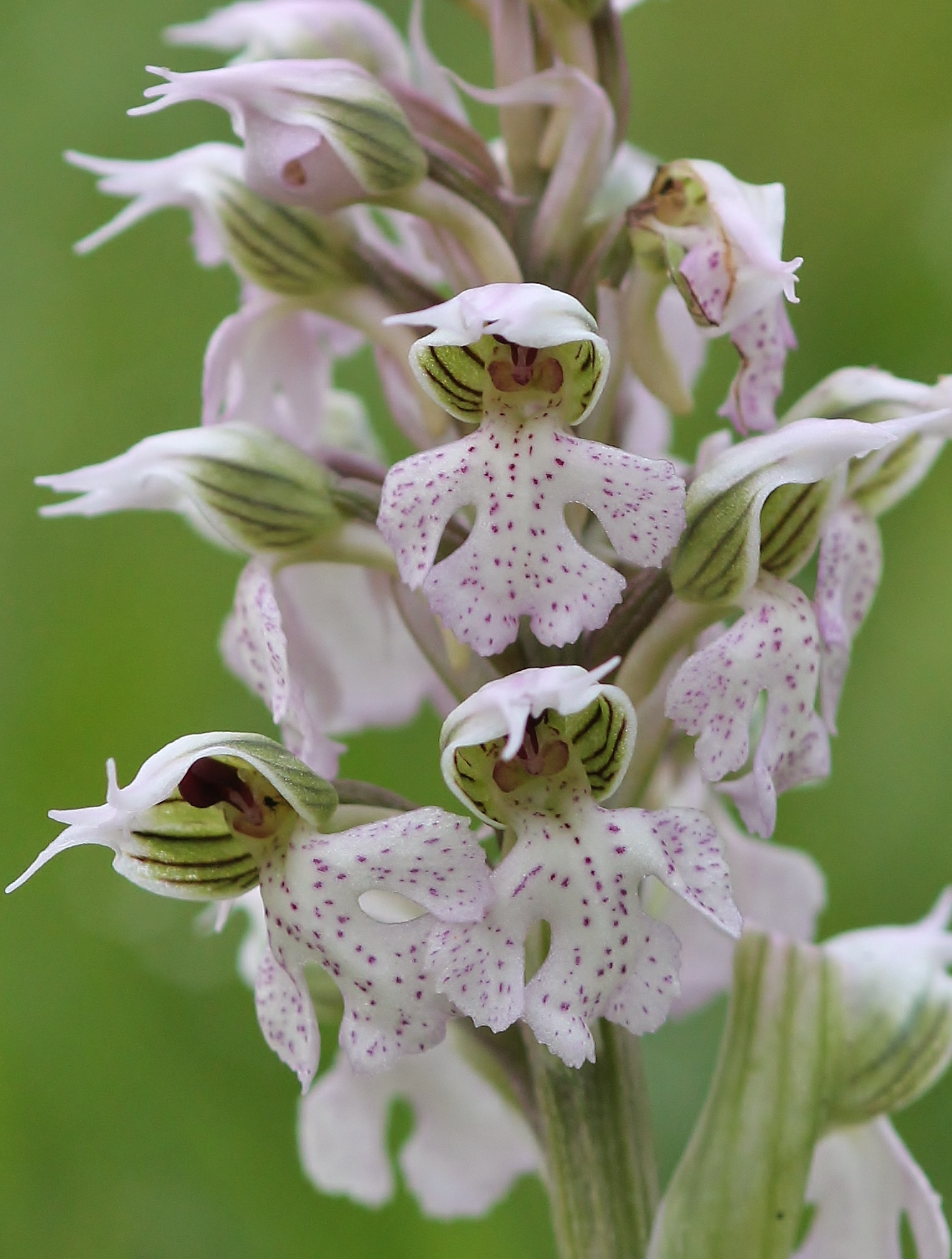
Neotinea lactea, an orchid

A galea is an overhanging, helmet-shaped, part of the flower that protects the reproductive parts from precipitation, wind, or unwanted visitors. The galea is composed of one or more petals or sepals that have either fused or folded together. The name is taken from the same word for a Roman soldier's helmet.

The specific epithet galeatus(-a-um), galeiformis(-e), galeritus(-a-um) or galericulatus(-a-um) can be found in nomenclature, referring to a prominent helmet-shaped feature in the organism. There are several genera that have been named to reflect this characteristic: Galeopsis, Galeandra, Galearia and Galearis.
