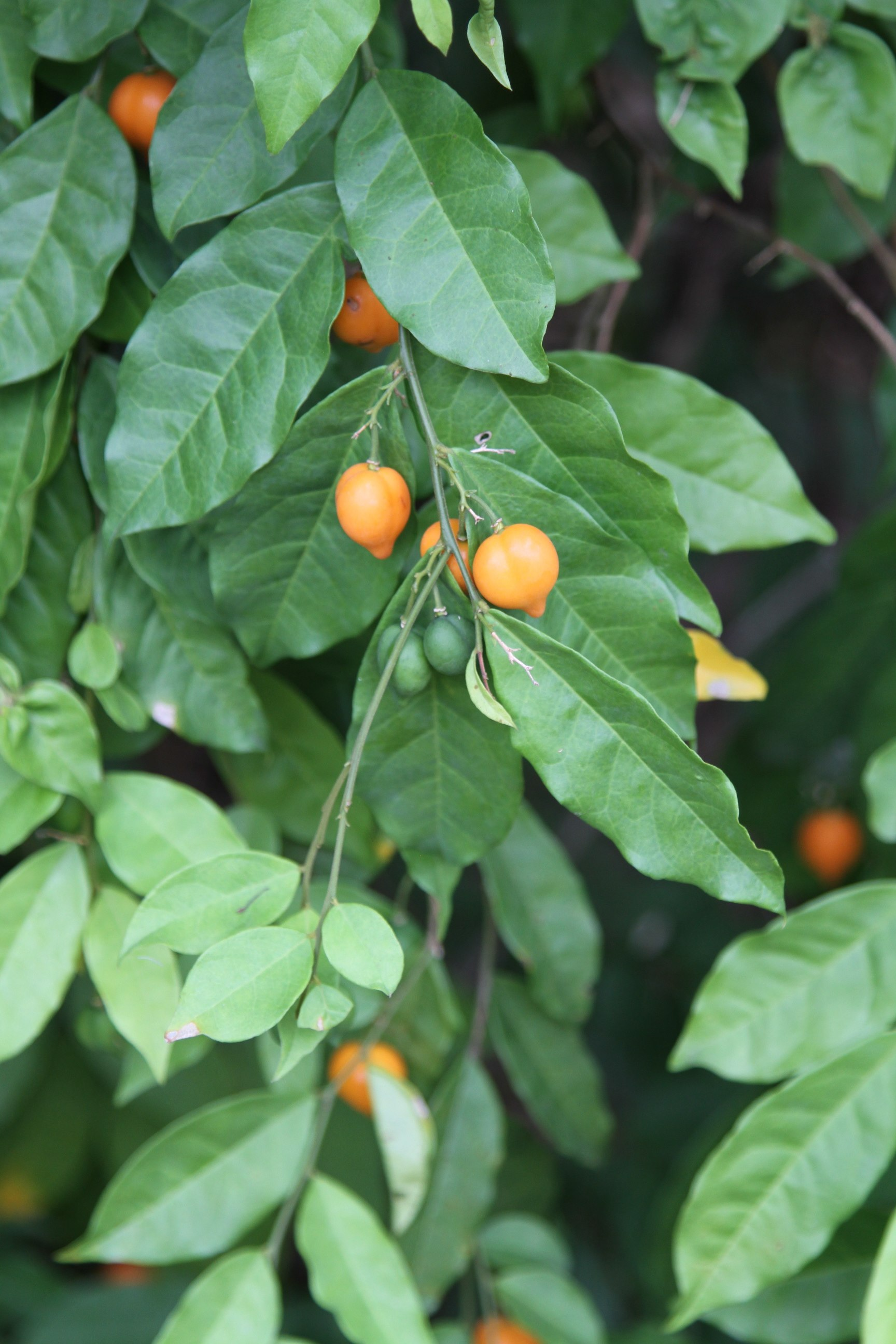
- Microdesmis keayana

Scientific classification
- Kingdom: Plantae
- Clade: Tracheophytes
- Clade: Angiosperms
- Clade: Eudicots
- Clade: Rosids
- Order: Malpighiales
- Family: Pandaceae
- Genus: Microdesmis; Hook.f. ex Hook.

Synonyms
- Tetragyne Miq.; Worcesterianthus Merr.

= Microdesmis =

Genus of flowering plants

Microdesmis is a genus of plants of the family Pandaceae. It is native to tropical Africa, China and Southeast Asia.

- Microdesmis afrodecandra Floret, A.M.Louis & J.M.Reitsma - Gabon
- Microdesmis camerunensis J.Léonard - Cameroon, Gabon, Congo-Brazzaville
- Microdesmis caseariifolia Planch. ex Hook -Guangdong, Guangxi, Hainan, Yunnan, Bangladesh, Cambodia, Borneo, Sumatra, Laos, Malaysia, Myanmar, Philippines, Thailand, Vietnam
- Microdesmis haumaniana J.Léonard - Gabon, Congo-Brazzaville, Zaïre, Angola
- Microdesmis kasaiensis J.Léonard - Zaïre
- Microdesmis keayana J.Léonard - Benin, Ghana, Guinea, Ivory Coast, Liberia, Sierra Leone, Togo, Nigeria
- Microdesmis klainei J.Léonard - Gabon
- Microdesmis magallanensis (Elmer) Steenis - Luzon, Sibuyan
- Microdesmis pierlotiana J.Léonard - Cameroon, Gabon, Congo-Brazzaville, Zaïre, Central African Republic
- Microdesmis puberula Hook.f. ex Planch - widespread across central Africa from Nigeria east to Uganda, south to Angola
- Microdesmis yafungana J.Léonard - Zaïre
