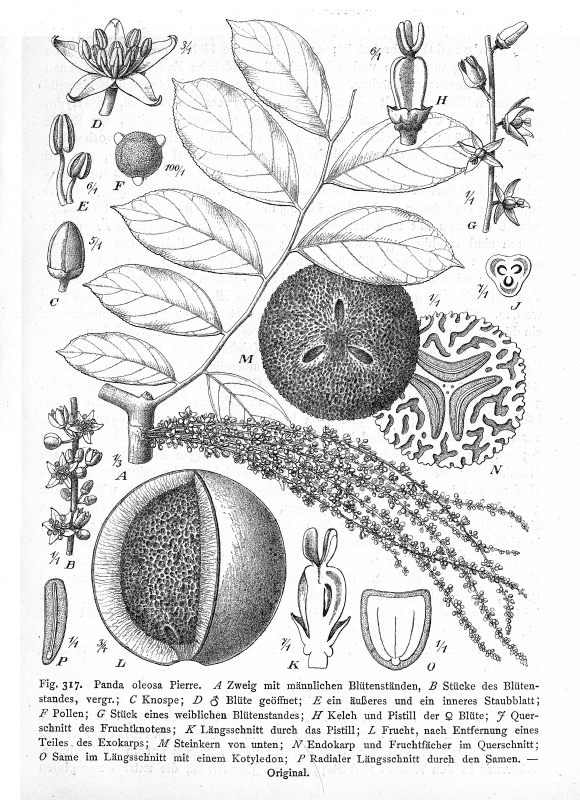
- Panda oleosa, from Vegetation der Erde (1915)

Scientific classification
- Kingdom: Plantae
- Clade: Tracheophytes
- Clade: Angiosperms
- Clade: Eudicots
- Clade: Rosids
- Order: Malpighiales
- Family: Pandaceae
- Genus: Panda; Pierre
- Species: P. oleosa

Binomial name
- Panda oleosa Pierre

Synonyms
- Porphyranthus Engl.; Porphyranthus zenkeri Engl.; Sorindeia rubiflora Engl.

= Panda oleosa =

Species of flowering plant

Panda is a plant genus of the family Pandaceae. It contains only one known species, Panda oleosa, native to western and central Africa (Liberia, Ghana, Guinea, Ivory Coast, Nigeria, Cabinda, Gabon, Central African Republic, Congo-Brazzaville, Cameroon, Zaire).

Chimpanzees have been observed to hammer on the nuts of Panda oleosa, which are particularly hard to open.

Humans cook and eat the seeds and also use an oil produced by the seeds in food preparation, the wood is used to make canoes and for carpentry.
