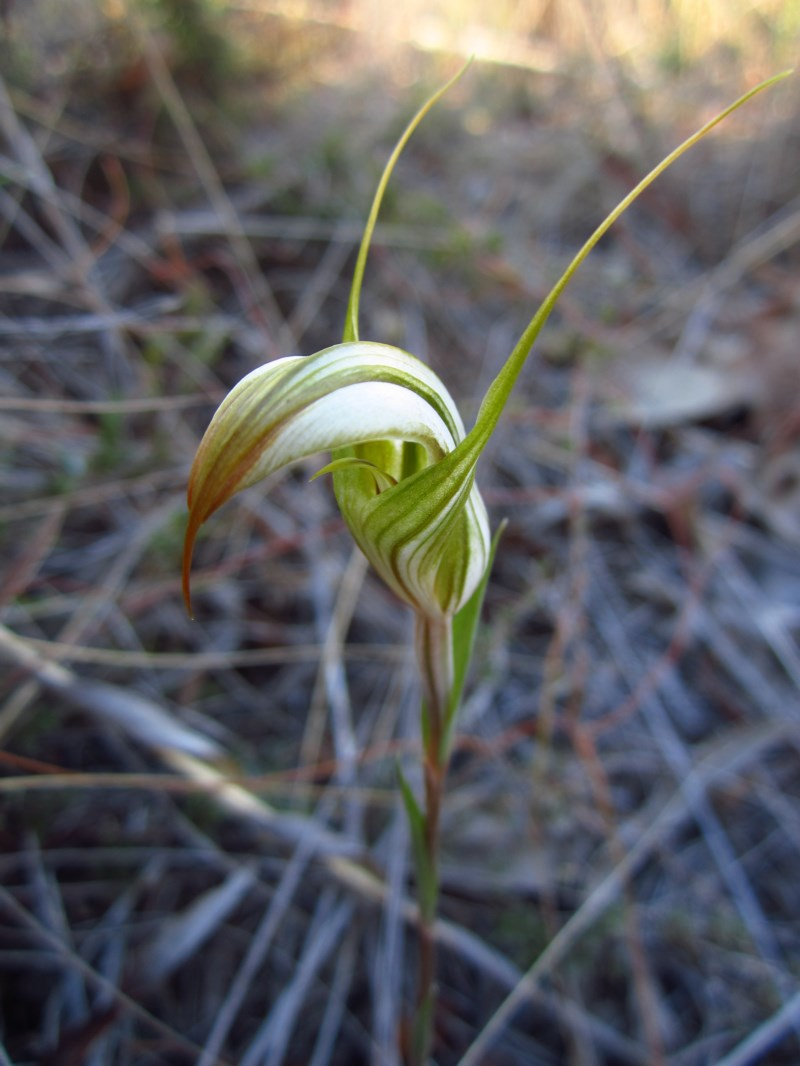
- Pterostylis revoluta growing in the Aranda bushland reserve

Scientific classification
- Kingdom: Plantae
- Clade: Tracheophytes
- Clade: Angiosperms
- Clade: Monocots
- Order: Asparagales
- Family: Orchidaceae
- Subfamily: Orchidoideae
- Tribe: Cranichideae
- Genus: Pterostylis
- Species: P. revoluta

Binomial name
- Pterostylis revoluta R.Br.

Synonyms
- Arethusa tetrapetala Diment, Humphries, Newington & Shaugnessy nom. inval., pro syn.; Arethusa tetrapetala M.A.Clem. nom. inval., pro syn.; Diplodium revolutum (R.Br.) D.L.Jones & M.A.Clem.; Pterostylis speciosa T.E.Hunt nom. illeg.; Diplodium reflexum auct. non (R.Br.) D.L.Jones & M.A.Clem.

= Pterostylis revoluta =

Autumn greenhood

Species of orchid

Pterostylis revoluta, commonly known as the autumn greenhood, is a species of orchid endemic to south-eastern Australia. As with similar greenhoods, the flowering plants differ from those not flowering. The non-flowering plants have a rosette of leaves flat on the ground but the flowering plants have a single flower with leaves on the flowering spike. This greenhood has white and green flowers that have a long, curved, pointed labellum that extends beyond the sinus between the lateral sepals.

== Description ==
Pterostylis revoluta is a terrestrial, perennial, deciduous, herb with an underground tuber and when not flowering, a rosette of between three and seven greyish to bluish, egg-shaped leaves. Each leaf in the rosette is 10–30 mm (0.39–1.18 in) long and 4–12 mm (0.16–0.47 in) wide. Flowering plants have a single flower 20–25 mm (0.79–0.98 in) long, 9–12 mm (0.35–0.47 in) wide and that lean forwards slightly. The flower is borne on a flowering stem 100–150 mm (3.9–5.9 in) high with between three and five leaves wrapped around the stem. The flowers are pale green and white with a brown tinge. The dorsal sepal and petals are fused, forming a hood or "galea" over the column. The dorsal sepal curves forward and downward with a thread-like tip 4–8 mm (0.16–0.31 in) long. The lateral sepals are held closely against the galea, have an erect, curved thread-like tip 20–25 mm (0.79–0.98 in) long and a narrow V-shaped sinus between their bases. The labellum is 14–17 mm (0.55–0.67 in) long, about 3 mm (0.12 in) wide, curved, pointed and extends for about half its length above the sinus. Flowering occurs from February to June.

== Taxonomy and naming ==
Pterostylis revoluta was first formally described in 1810 by Robert Brown and the description was published in the Prodromus Florae Novae Hollandiae et Insulae Van Diemen. The specific epithet (revoluta) is a Latin word meaning "turned over" or "rolled back".

== Distribution and habitat ==
The autumn greenhood grows on sheltered slopes in forest and in coastal scrub in coastal and near-coastal area from south-east Queensland to Nowra in New South Wales and as far inland as Cessnock.
