= Centroplacus =

Scientific classification
- Kingdom: Plantae
- Clade: Tracheophytes
- Clade: Angiosperms
- Clade: Eudicots
- Clade: Rosids
- Order: Malpighiales
- Family: Centroplacaceae
- Genus: Centroplacus; Pierre
- Species: C. glaucinus

Binomial name
- Centroplacus glaucinus Pierre

Synonyms
- Microdesmis paniculata Pax

Genus of flowering plants

Centroplacus is a genus of the family Centroplacaceae. It was formerly classified in the Phyllanthaceae and given its own tribe, the Centroplaceae. It contains a single species, Centroplacus glaucinus.

== General information ==
C. glaucinus is an understorey tree, usually at low elevations, growing up to 20 metres tall; a dioecious species, flowers unisexual (male and female forms).

== Range ==
Centroplacus occurs in West tropical Africa (Cameroon, Equatorial Guinea, Gabon).
