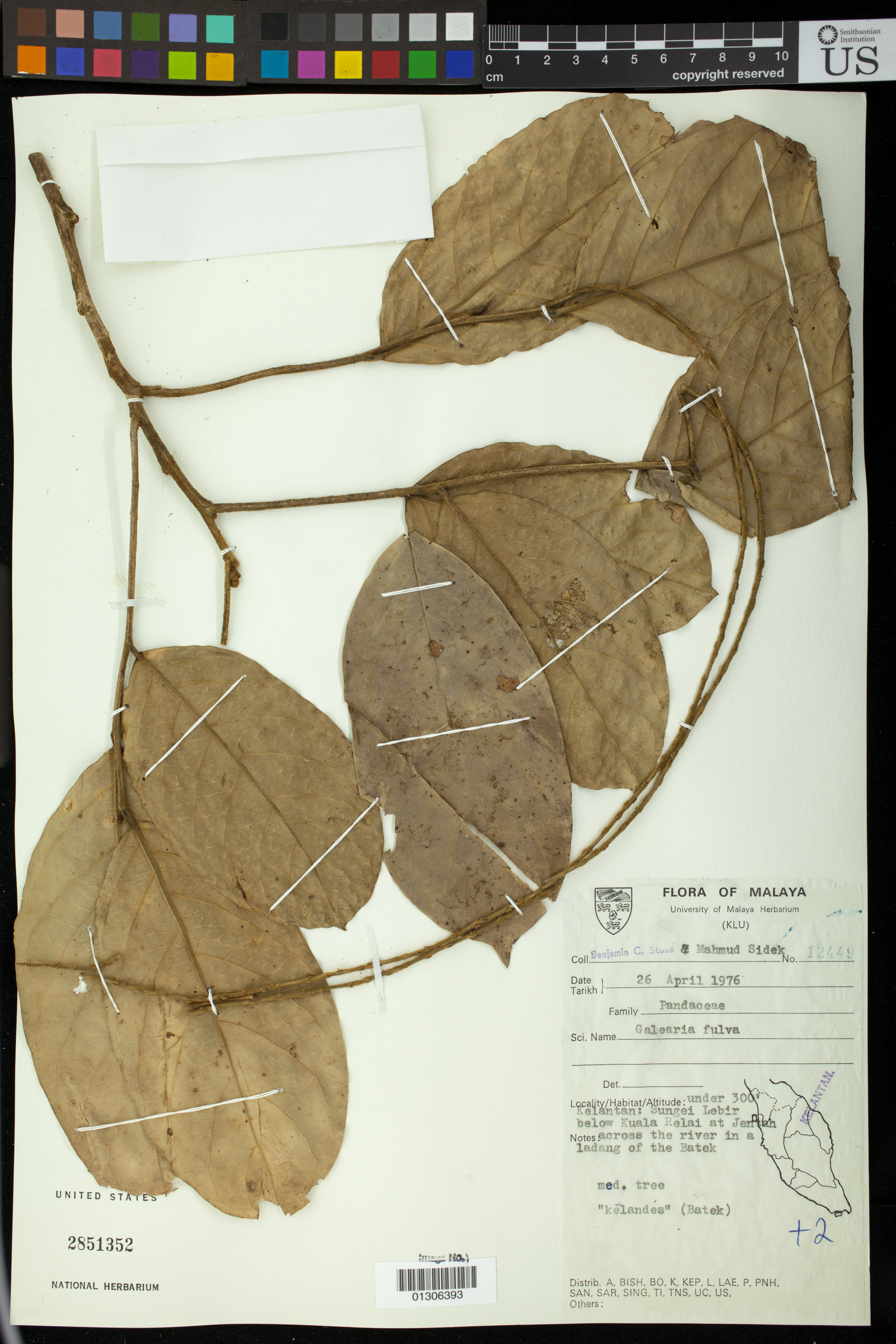
- Galearia fulva

Scientific classification
- Kingdom: Plantae
- Clade: Tracheophytes
- Clade: Angiosperms
- Clade: Eudicots
- Clade: Rosids
- Order: Malpighiales
- Family: Pandaceae
- Genus: Galearia; Zoll. & Moritzi

Synonyms
- Bennettia R.Br. in J.J.Bennett; Cremostachys Tul.

= Galearia =

Genus of flowering plants

Galearia is a genus of plant of the family Pandaceae. It is native to Indochina, insular Southeast Asia, New Guinea and the Solomon Islands. They are large trees or shrubs which exude a white liquid.

Accepted species:

- Galearia aristifera Miq. - Borneo, Malaysia, Sumatra
- Galearia celebica Koord. - Sulawesi, New Guinea, Bismarck Archipelago, Solomon Islands
- Galearia filiformis (Blume) Boerl. - Java, Sumatra
- Galearia fulva (Tul.) Miq. - Indochina, Borneo, Malaysia, Sumatra, Philippines
- Galearia maingayi Hook.f. - Thailand, Borneo, Malaysia, Sumatra
