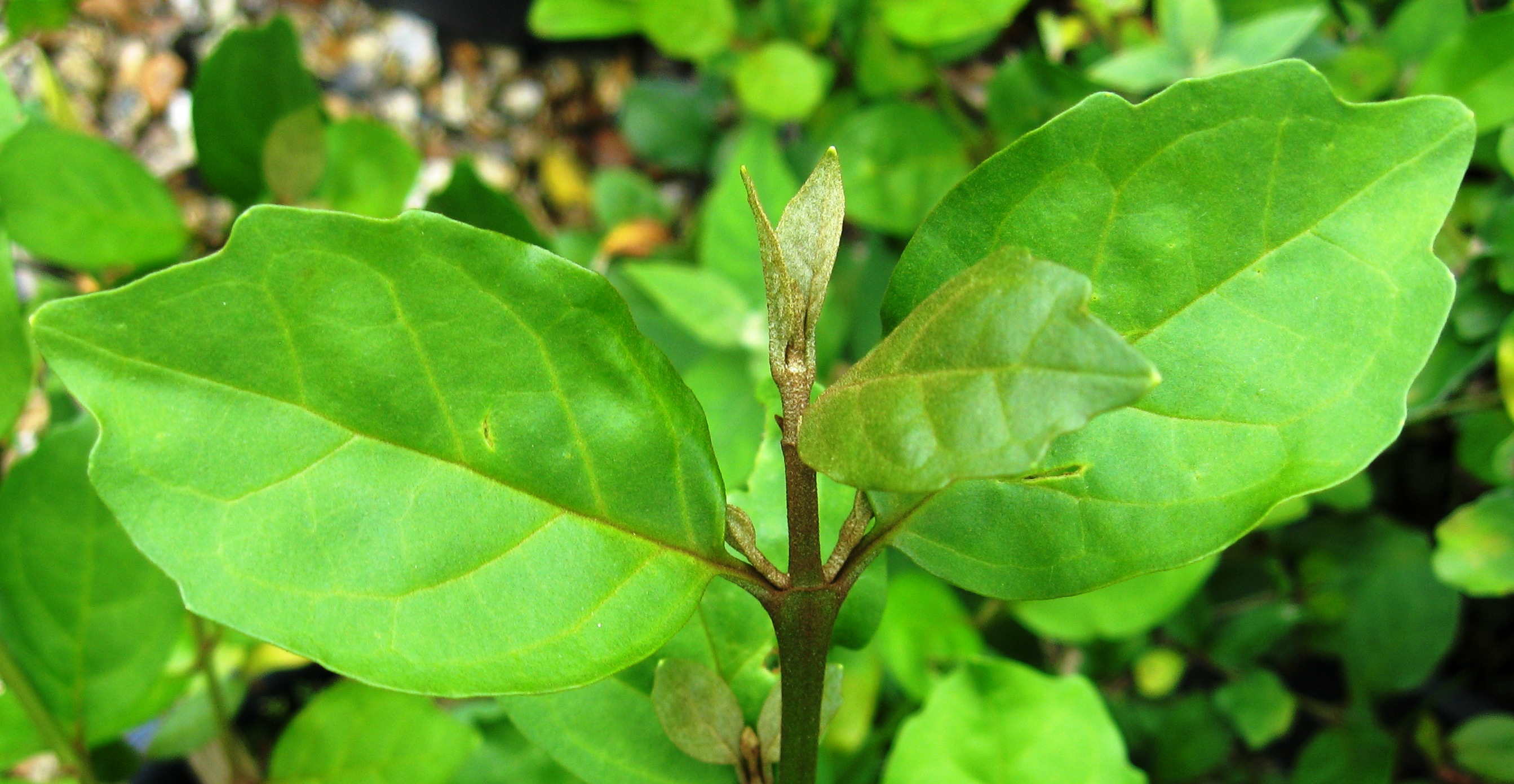
- Buddleja indica leaves

Scientific classification
- Kingdom: Plantae
- Clade: Tracheophytes
- Clade: Angiosperms
- Clade: Eudicots
- Clade: Asterids
- Order: Lamiales
- Family: Scrophulariaceae
- Genus: Buddleja
- Species: B. indica

Binomial name
- Buddleja indica Lam.

Synonyms
- Nicodemia diversifolia Ten.

= Buddleja indica =

Species of flowering plant

Buddleja indica is an evergreen shrub native to Madagascar, the Comoro Islands, and the Mascarene Islands, where it grows from the coast into the mountains up to elevations of 2000 m in either scrub or clearings. B. indica was named and described by Lamarck in 1785.

== Description ==
Buddleja indica grows to < 4 m in height in the wild, its branches climbing or trailing. The leaves are opposite, smooth, and dark green, ranging from 2 – 5 cm long by 2 – 5 cm wide, occasionally with petioles < 3 – 10 mm long. The leaf shape, as implied by the synonym, is extremely variable, from orbicular to oak-like. The small clusters of sparse and insignificant greenish yellow to yellow or white flowers are borne in the axils of the leaves at the end of the shoots.

== Cultivation ==
Unable to tolerate temperatures below 10 °C and low humidity, B. indica is grown almost exclusively as a houseplant, notably in the US where it is often known as the oak-leaf buddleja. The shrub rarely flowers in cultivation, and is principally grown for its unusual foliage. In the UK, specimens are grown under glass at the Royal Botanic Garden Edinburgh and as part of the NCCPG national collection at Longstock Park Nursery, near Stockbridge. Hardiness: USDA zone 10.
