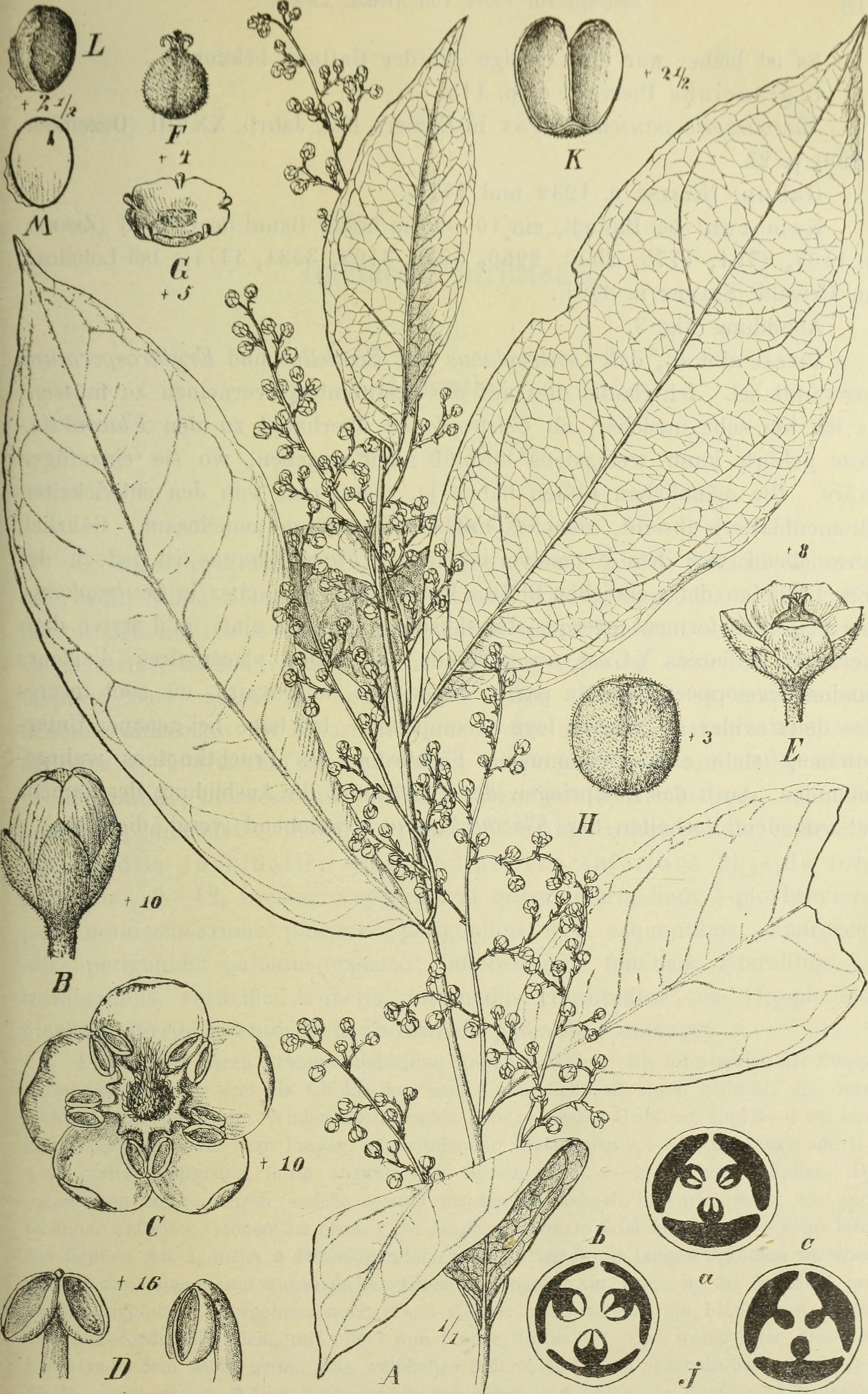
- Centroplacus glaucinus Botanische Jahrbücher für Systematik, Pflanzengeschichte und Pflanzengeographie (1907)

Scientific classification
- Kingdom: Plantae
- Clade: Tracheophytes
- Clade: Angiosperms
- Clade: Eudicots
- Clade: Rosids
- Order: Malpighiales
- Family: Centroplacaceae; Doweld & Reveal

Genera
- Bhesa; Centroplacus

= Centroplacaceae =

Family of flowering plants

Centroplacaceae is a family of flowering plants in the order Malpighiales and is recognized by the APG III system of classification. The family comprises two genera: Bhesa, which was formerly recognized in the Celastraceae, and Centroplacus, which was formerly recognized in the Euphorbiaceae, together comprising six species. The Angiosperm Phylogeny Group determined that based on previous phylogenetic analysis, these two genera formed an isolated clade and recognition of the family was "reasonable."
