= Kubitzki system =

System of plant taxonomy

The Kubitzki system is a system of plant taxonomy devised by Klaus Kubitzki, and is the product of an ongoing survey of vascular plants, entitled The Families and Genera of Vascular Plants, and extending to 15 volumes in 2018. The survey, in the form of an encyclopedia, is important as a comprehensive, multivolume treatment of the vascular plants, with keys to and descriptions of all families and genera, mostly by specialists in those groups. The Kubitzki system served as the basis for classification in Mabberley's Plant-Book, a dictionary of the vascular plants. Mabberley states, in his Introduction on page xi of the 2008 edition, that the Kubitzki system "has remained the standard to which other literature is compared".

In ordinal and family arrangements, the classification system in the initial angiosperm volumes closely resembles the Dahlgren system in Monocots and the Cronquist system in Dicots, but later volumes have been influenced by recent molecular phylogenetic studies.

The first volume of the series (Pteridophytes and Gymnosperms) covered lycophytes, monilophytes, and gymnosperms, and was published in 1990. By 2010, there were nine published volumes, covering 39 of the 59 orders of flowering plants that are recognized in the APG III system. The order Saxifragales is covered except for the genus Medusandra, which was transferred to it from Malpighiales in 2009. Volume 10 (2011) covers the family Myrtaceae and the orders Cucurbitales and Sapindales. Volume 11 was published in 2014, and two further volumes in 2015. Volumes 2, and 5–7 address dicotyledons, while volumes 3, 4 and 13 address monocotyledons. Volumes 8–12 and 14 deal with eudicots.

Because it is the result of a work in progress, the Kubitzki system is incomplete for those groups of plants that have not yet been covered, and groups that have been completely covered are not revised in light of subsequent knowledge. Since the first volume was published in 1990, a great deal has been learned about plant taxonomy, mostly by phylogenetic analysis of DNA sequences. The classification of ferns has been completely overhauled in that time. And some of the gymnosperm families have been revised.

For the flowering plants, the later volumes of the Kubitzki System follows the Angiosperm Phylogeny Group last revised in 2009 (APG III system), except for the recognition of smaller families. (For a complete listing of all volumes, see Klaus Kubitzki)

== Classification ==
=== Summary ===
Divisions

- Pteridophyta
- Pinophyta
  - subdivision Coniferophytina
  - subdivision Cycadophytina
- Magnoliophyta
  - class Monocotyledoneae
  - class Dicotyledoneae

=== Pteridophyta ===
- 1 division Pteridophyta
  1 class Psilotatae
  Psilotaceae
  2 class Lycopodiatae
  Isoetaceae
  Lycopodiaceae
  Selaginellaceae
  3 class Equisetatae
  Equisetaceae
  4 class Filicatae
  Aspleniaceae
  Azollaceae
  Blechnaceae
  Cheiropleuriaceae
  Cyatheaceae
  Davalliaceae
  Dennstaedtiaceae
  Dicksoniaceae
  Dipteridaceae
  Dryopteridaceae
  Gleicheniaceae
  Grammitidaceae
  Hymenophyllaceae
  Hymenophyllopsidaceae
  Lomariopsidaceae
  Lophosoriaceae
  Loxsomataceae
  Marattiaceae
  Marsileaceae
  Matoniaceae
  Metaxyaceae
  Monachosoraceae
  Nephrolepidaceae
  Oleandraceae
  Ophioglossaceae
  Osmundaceae
  Plagiogyriaceae
  Polypodiaceae
  Pteridaceae
  Salviniaceae
  Schizaeaceae
  Thelypteridaceae
  Vittariaceae

=== Pinophyta ===
- 2 division Pinophyta or Gymnospermae
  - 1 subdivision Coniferophytina
  1 class Ginkgoatae
  Ginkgoaceae
  2 class Pinatae
  1 order Pinales
  Araucariaceae
  Pinaceae
  Sciadopityaceae
  Taxodiaceae
  Cupressaceae
  Phyllocladaceae
  Podocarpaceae
  2 order Taxales
  Cephalotaxaceae
  Taxaceae
  - 2 subdivision Cycadophytina
  1 class Cycadatae
  order Cycadales
  Boweniaceae
  Cycadaceae
  Stangeriaceae
  Zamiaceae
  2 class Gnetatae
  order Gnetales
  Ephedraceae
  Welwitschiaceae
  Gnetaceae

=== Magnoliophyta ===
- 3 division Magnoliophyta or Angiospermae
  subdivision Magnoliophytina

==== Monocotyledoneae ====
- 1 class Monocotyledoneae or Liliopsida [complete] (with Rolf Dahlgren's collaboration)

4 Superorders

1. Acoranae
2. Alismatanae
3. Lilianae
4. Commelinanae

===== Acoranae =====
- 1 superorder Acoranae
  Acoraceae
  Not included in any order
  Nartheciaceae

===== Alismatanae =====
- 2 superorder Alismatanae
  1 order Arales
  Araceae
  Lemnaceae
  2 order Alismatales
  Butomaceae
  Alismataceae
  Limnocharitaceae
  Hydrocharitaceae
  Najadaceae
  Aponogetonaceae
  Scheuchzeriaceae
  Juncaginaceae
  Potamogetonaceae
  Ruppiaceae
  Posidoniaceae
  Zosteraceae
  Zannichelliaceae
  Cymodoceaceae

===== Lilianae =====
- 3 superorder Lilianae
  1 order Liliales
  Campynemataceae
  Luzuriagaceae
  Alstroemeriaceae
  Colchicaceae
  Melanthiaceae
  Trilliaceae
  Liliaceae
  Calochortaceae
  Petermanniaceae
  Smilacaceae
  Philesiaceae
  2 order Asparagales
  Orchidaceae
  Iridaceae
  Doryanthaceae
  Lanariaceae
  Ixioliriaceae
  Hypoxidaceae
  Johnsoniaceae
  Hemerocallidaceae
  Tecophilaeaceae
  Blandfordiaceae
  Asteliaceae
  Boryaceae
  Asphodelaceae
  Xanthorrhoeaceae
  Aphyllanthaceae
  Anemarrhenaceae
  Amaryllidaceae
  Agapanthaceae
  Alliaceae
  Themidaceae
  Asparagaceae
  Hyacinthaceae
  Lomandraceae
  Herreriaceae
  Hostaceae
  Anthericaceae
  Agavaceae
  Eriospermaceae
  Ruscaceae
  Behniaceae
  Dracaenaceae
  Convallariaceae
  Nolinaceae
  3 order Triuridales
  Triuridaceae
  4 order Dioscoreales
  Dioscoreaceae
  Trichopodaceae
  Taccaceae
  Burmanniaceae
  Corsiaceae
  5 order Pandanales
  Pandanaceae
  Cyclanthaceae
  Velloziaceae
  Acanthochlamydaceae
  Stemonaceae
  Pentastemonaceae

===== Commelinanae =====
- 4 superorder Commelinanae
  1 order Principes
  Palmae
  2 order Dasypogonales
  Dasypogonaceae
  3 order Bromeliales
  Bromeliaceae
  ?Rapateaceae (see also Xyridales)
  4 order Commelinales
  Commelinaceae
  Pontederiaceae
  Philydraceae
  Haemodoraceae
  5 order Xyridales
  Mayacaceae
  Xyridaceae
  Eriocaulaceae
  ?Rapateaceae
  6 order Zingiberales
  Musaceae
  Strelitziaceae
  Lowiaceae
  Heliconiaceae
  Costaceae
  Zingiberaceae
  Cannaceae
  Marantaceae
  ?Hanguanaceae (possibly related to Zingiberales or Commelinales)
  7 order Typhales
  Typhaceae
  8 order Juncales
  Juncaceae
  Thurniaceae
  Cyperaceae
  9 order Poales
  Flagellariaceae
  Restionaceae
  Ecdeiocoleaceae
  Anarthriaceae
  Centrolepidaceae
  Joinvilleaceae
  Poaceae
  incertae sedis in monocots
  Hydatellaceae

==== Dicotyledoneae ====
- 2 class Dicotyledoneae or Magnoliopsida [incomplete]
  1 subclass Magnoliidae
  1 superorder Magnolianae (lower magnoliids)
  1 order Magnoliales
  Himantandraceae
  Eupomatiaceae
  Austrobaileyaceae
  Degeneriaceae
  Magnoliaceae
  Annonaceae
  Myristicaceae
  ?Canellaceae
  ?Lactoridaceae
  Amborellaceae
  Trimeniaceae
  Chloranthaceae
  Monimiaceae
  Gomortegaceae
  Lauraceae
  Hernandiaceae
  Calycanthaceae
  2 order Illiciales
  Winteraceae
  ?Canellaceae
  Illiciaceae
  Schisandraceae
  3 order Aristolochiales
  Aristolochiaceae
  Hydnoraceae
  ?Rafflesiaceae
  4 order Piperales
  Saururaceae
  Piperaceae
  2 superorder Ranunculanae (higher magnoliids)
  1 order Nelumbonales
  Nelumbonaceae
  2 order Ranunculales
  Lardizabalaceae
  Berberidaceae
  Menispermaceae
  Ranunculaceae
  ?Circaeasteraceae
  Pteridophyllaceae
  Papaveraceae
  Fumariaceae
  3 superorder Nymphaeanae
  order Nymphaeales
  Cabombaceae
  Nymphaeaceae
  ?Ceratophyllaceae
  4 superorder Caryophyllanae
  order Caryophyllales (including.:Centrospermae Eichler)
  Family with an asterisk: *, included in Expanded Caryophyllales in Volume V.
  Family with the sign +, only recognized in Volume V, but not in Volume II.
  Nepenthaceae *
  Droseraceae *
  Drosophyllaceae *
  Simmondsiaceae *
  Rhabdodendraceae *
  Asteropeiaceae *
  Physenaceae *
  Ancistrocladaceae *
  Dioncophyllaceae *
  Frankeniaceae *
  Tamaricaceae *
  clade Centrospermae
  Caryophyllaceae
  Molluginaceae
  Aizoaceae
  Amaranthaceae
  Chenopodiaceae
  Halophytaceae
  Stegnospermaceae
  Achatocarpaceae
  Phytolaccaceae
  Nyctaginaceae
  Cactaceae
  Portulacaceae
  Didiereaceae
  Basellaceae
  Hectorellaceae
  Barbeuiaceae +
  Sarcobataceae +
  Petiveriaceae +
  Agdestidaceae +
  5 superorder Hamamelidanae
  1 order Trochodendrales
  Trochodendraceae
  Eupteleaceae
  Cercidiphyllaceae
  ?Myrothamnaceae
  2 order Hamamelidales
  Platanaceae
  Hamamelidaceae
  3 order Fagales
  Fagaceae
  Betulaceae
  Ticodendraceae
  4 order Juglandales
  Rhoipteleaceae
  Juglandaceae
  Myricaceae
  5 order ?Casuarinales
  Casuarinaceae
  6 superorder Polygonanae
  order Polygonales
  Polygonaceae
  7 superorder Plumbaginanae
  order Plumbaginales
  Plumbaginaceae
  8 superorder Malvanae
  order Malvales
  Neuradaceae
  Tepuianthaceae
  Thymelaeaceae
  Dipterocarpaceae
  Diegodendraceae
  Sphaerosepalaceae
  Cistaceae
  Sarcolaenaceae
  Bixaceae
  Cochlospermaceae
  Muntingiaceae
  Malvaceae

In volumes 5,6,7,8 no groups above the taxonomic rank of order were recognized.

- order Capparales
  Bataceae
  Salvadoraceae
  Tropaeolaceae
  Limnanthaceae
  Caricaceae
  Moringaceae
  Setchellanthaceae
  Akaniaceae
  Gyrostemonaceae
  Resedaceae
  Pentadiplandraceae
  Tovariaceae
  Koeberliniaceae
  Cruciferae or Brassicaceae
  Capparaceae
  Emblingiaceae
  Not placed in any order, but related to Capparales
  Tapisciaceae
  order Celastrales
  Parnassiaceae
  Lepidobotryaceae
  Celastraceae
  order Oxalidales
  Oxalidaceae
  Connaraceae
  Cephalotaceae
  Brunelliaceae
  Cunoniaceae
  Elaeocarpaceae
  order Rosales (# revised position, formerly in Urticales in Vol. 2)
  Rosaceae (including Guamatela)
  Dirachmaceae
  Rhamnaceae
  Barbeyaceae #
  Elaeagnaceae
  Ulmaceae #
  Moraceae #
  Cecropiaceae (including Cannabaceae) #
  Urticaceae #
  order Cornales
  Hydrostachyaceae
  Curtisiaceae
  Grubbiaceae
  Cornaceae
  Hydrangeaceae
  Loasaceae
  order Ericales
  Theophrastaceae
  Samolaceae
  Maesaceae
  Myrsinaceae
  Primulaceae
  Actinidiaceae
  Balsaminaceae
  Marcgraviaceae
  Pellicieraceae
  Tetrameristaceae
  Ericaceae
  Clethraceae
  Cyrillaceae
  Roridulaceae
  Sarraceniaceae
  Diapensiaceae
  Lissocarpaceae
  Polemoniaceae
  Fouquieriaceae
  Scytopetalaceae
  Lecythidaceae
  Napoleonaeaceae
  Styracaceae
  Ebenaceae
  Sladeniaceae
  Theaceae
  Ternstroemiaceae
  Sapotaceae
  Symplocaceae
  order Lamiales
  Bignoniaceae
  Buddlejaceae
  Byblidaceae
  Callitrichaceae
  Carlemanniaceae
  Cyclocheilaceae
  Gesneriaceae
  Globulariaceae
  Hippuridaceae
  Labiatae
  Lentibulariaceae
  Martyniaceae
  Myoporaceae
  Nesogenaceae
  Oleaceae
  Pedaliaceae
  Phrymaceae
  Plantaginaceae
  Plocospermataceae
  Scrophulariaceae
  Stilbaceae
  Tetrachondraceae
  Trapellaceae
  Verbenaceae
  order Asterales
  Alseuosmiaceae
  Argophyllaceae
  Compositae or Asteraceae
  subfamily Barnadesioideae
  subfamily Mutisioideae
  subfamily Carduoideae
  subfamily Cichorioideae
  subfamily Asteroideae
  Calyceraceae
  Campanulaceae
  Carpodetaceae
  Goodeniaceae
  Menyanthaceae
  Pentaphragmataceae
  Phellinaceae
  Rousseaceae
  Stylidiaceae

In volume 9 the supraordinal groups Rosidae and Asteridae were recognized.

- Not included in any order
  Sabiaceae
  order Proteales
  Proteaceae
  Platanaceae (revised position, formerly in Hamamelidales in Vol. 2)
  Nelumbonales (revised position, formerly in Nelumbonales in Vol. 2)
  order Buxales
  Buxaceae
  Didymelaceae
  order Gunnerales
  Gunneraceae
  Myrothamnaceae (revised position, formerly in Trochodendrales in Vol. 2)
  Not included in any order
  Dilleniaceae
  order Saxifragales
  Altingiaceae (newly recognized family, included in Hamamelidaceae in Vol. 2)
  Aphanopetalaceae
  Cercidiphyllaceae (revised position, formerly in Trochodendrales in Vol. 2)
  Crassulaceae
  Daphniphyllaceae
  Grossulariaceae
  Haloragaceae
  Hamamelidaceae (revised position, formerly in Hamamelidales in Vol. 2)
  Iteaceae
  Paeoniaceae
  Penthoraceae
  Peridiscaceae (except Medusandra)
  Pterostemonaceae
  Saxifragaceae
  Tetracarpaeaceae
  order Vitales
  Leeaceae
  Vitaceae
  order Zygophyllales
  Krameriaceae
  Zygophyllaceae
  Not included in any order
  Huaceae
  order Geraniales
  Geraniaceae
  Ledocarpaceae
  Melianthaceae
  order Crossosomatales (Guamatela placed in Rosaceae in volume 6)
  Aphloiaceae
  Crossosomataceae
  Geissolomataceae
  Ixerbaceae
  Stachyuraceae
  Staphyleaceae
  Strasburgeraceae
  Not included in any order
  Picramniaceae
  order Berberidopsidales
  Aextoxicaceae
  Berberidopsidaceae

In volume 10 are treated the Orders Sapindales and Cucurbitales; and the Myrtaceae Family (belonging to Myrtales).

- order Sapindales
  Biebersteiniaceae
  Nitrariaceae
  Tetradiclidaceae
  Sapindaceae
  Kirkiaceae
  Anacardiaceae
  Burseraceae
  Rutaceae
  Simaroubaceae
  Meliaceae
  order Cucurbitales
  Anisophylleaceae
  Coriariaceae
  Corynocarpaceae
  Cucurbitaceae
  Datiscaceae
  Begoniaceae
  order Myrtales
  Myrtaceae

== See also ==
- Klaus Kubitzki
