= Carl Adolph Agardh =

Swedish cleric and botanist (1785-1859)

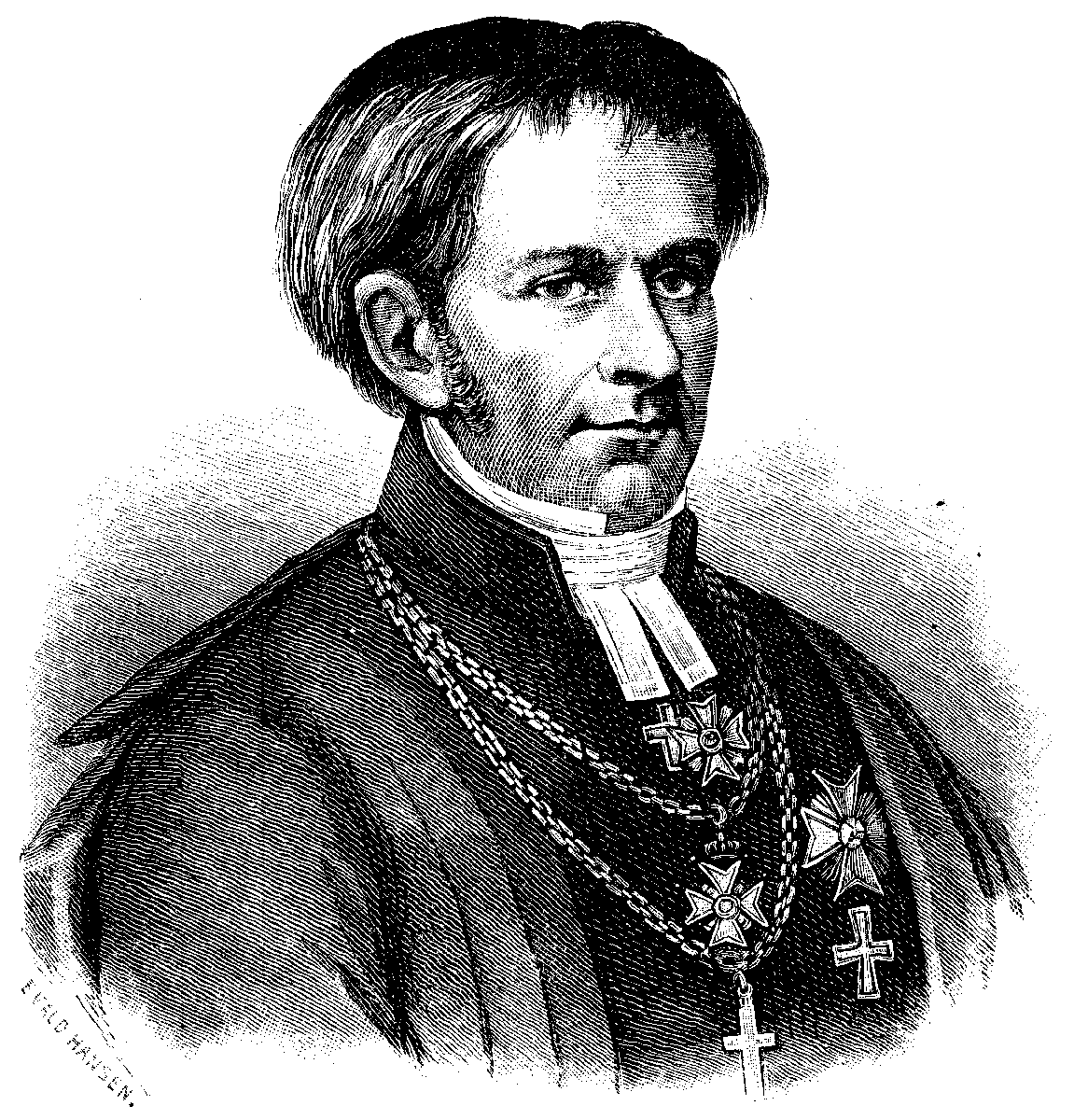
- Born: 23 January 1785; Båstad, Sweden
- Died: 12 January 1859 (aged 73); Karlstad, Sweden
- Known for: Biological Classification, Systema algarum
- Scientific career
- Fields: Botany, Church (bishop)
- Institutions: Lund University, Karlstad
- Author abbrev. (botany): C.Agardh

Carl Adolph Agardh (23 January 1785 in Båstad, Sweden – 28 January 1859 in Karlstad) was a Swedish botanist specializing in algae, who was eventually appointed bishop of Karlstad.

== Biography ==
In 1807 he was appointed teacher of mathematics at Lund University, in 1812 appointed professor of botany and natural sciences, and was elected a member of the Royal Swedish Academy of Sciences in 1817, and of the Swedish Academy in 1831.

He was ordained a clergyman in 1816, received two parishes as prebend, and was a representative in the clerical chamber of the Swedish Parliament on several occasions from 1817. He was rector magnificus of Lund University 1819-1820 and was appointed bishop of Karlstad in 1835, where he remained until his death. He was the father of Jacob Georg Agardh, also a botanist.

== System of plant classification ==
The Classes Plantarum has nine primary divisions into which his classes and natural orders are grouped. These are, with class numbers;

1. Acotyledonae 1–3 (Algae, Lichenes, Fungi)
2. Pseudocotyledonae 4–7 (Muscoideae, Tetradidymae, Filices, Equisetaceae)
3. Cryptocotyledonae 8–12 (Macropodae, Spadicinae, Glumiflorae, Liliiflorae, Gynandrae)
4. Phanerocotyledonae incompletae 13–16 (Micranthae, Oleraceae, Epichlamydeae, Columnantherae)
5. Phanerocotyledonae completae, hypogynae, monopetalae 17 (Tubiflorae)
6. Phanerocotyledonae completae, hypogynae, polypetalae 18–22 (Centrisporae, Brevistylae, Polycarpellae, Valvisporae, Columniferae)
7. Phanerocotyledonae completae, discigynae, monopetalae 23 (Tetraspermae)
8. Phanerocotyledonae completae, discigynae, polypetalae 24–26 (Gynobaseae, Trihilitae, Hypodicarpae)
9. Phanerocotyledonae completae, porigynae 27–33 (Subaggregatae, Aridifoliae, Succulentae, Calycanthemae, Peponiferae, Icosandrae, Leguminosae)

Each class then contains a number of orders (families). For instance, Liliiflorae contains 11 orders;

- Liliiflorae
  - 43 Asparageae
  - 44 Asphodeleae
  - 45 Coronariae (Note: Agardh notes that his Coronariae includes Linnaeus's Coronariae and Liliaceae, orders 9 and 10 of the latter)
  - 46 Veratreae
  - 47 Commelineae
  - 48 Pontedereae
  - 49 Dioscorinae
  - 50 Haemodoreae
  - 51 Irideae
  - 52 Narcisseae
  - 53 Bromeliaceae

Specimens collected by Agardh are cared for in herbaria including the National Herbarium of Victoria (MEL), Royal Botanic Gardens Victoria

== Publications ==
He devoted considerable attention to political economy and as "a leading liberal", he "succeeded in improving and raising the standards of education in Sweden". He also wrote on theological and other subjects, but his reputation chiefly rests on his botanical works, especially Systema algarum, Species algarum rite cognitae and Classes plantarum on biological classification, and Icones Algarum (1824, 1820–28, and 1828–35). The greatest part of his Manual of Botany (2 vols., Malmoe, 1829–32) has been translated into German.

=== List of selected publications ===
- Agardh, Carl Adolph (1825). Classes Plantarum. Lund: Literis Berlingianis.
- — (1817–1826). Aphorismi botanici. Lund: Literis Berlingianis.
- Algarum decas prima [-quarta] /auctore Carolo Ad. Agardh
- Dispositio algarum Sueciae /cuctore Carolo Adolfo Agardh
- Caroli A. Agardh Synopsis algarum Scandinaviae : adjecta dispositione universali algarum
- Adnotationes botanicae (with Swartz, Olof, Sprengel, Kurt Polycarp Joachim, and Wikström, Joh. Em)

== Bibliography ==
- Eriksson, Gunnar (1970). "Agardh, Carl Adolph". Dictionary of Scientific Biography. Vol. 1. New York: Charles Scribner's Sons. pp. 69–70. ISBN 0-684-10114-9.
- Short biography in French Archived 2015-06-21 at the Wayback Machine
- Lund University, Botanical Museum
- Lund Museum - Collections: algae

Cultural offices
Preceded by Claes Fleming	Swedish Academy, Seat No 4; 1831-1859	Succeeded by Fredrik Ferdinand Carlson
Religious titles
Preceded by Johan Jacob Hedrén	Bishop of Karlstad; 1835–1859	Succeeded by Johan Anton Millén
