= Centrospermae =

Group of flowering plants

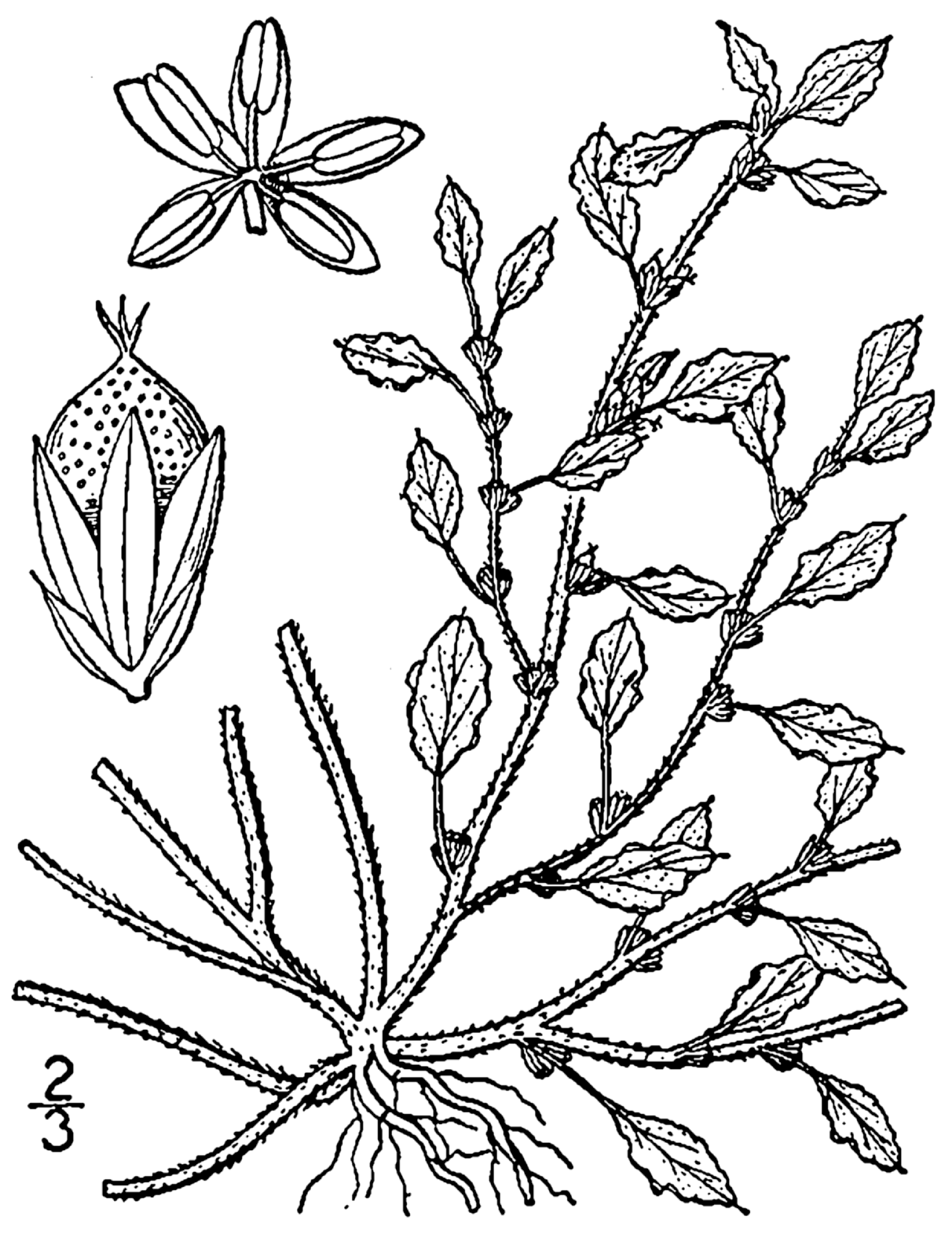
Centrospermae

Centrospermae is a descriptive botanical name, published in 1878 by Eichler, meaning "with the seed in the center", referring to the free (central) placentation. It was used in the Engler system and the Wettstein system) for an order of flowering plants.

In its circumscription, Centrospermae corresponds fairly closely to the order Caryophyllales in the system of Cronquist. In the APG III system, and in later versions of the Kubitzki system, Caryophyllales is defined to include much more than Centrospermae.

Molecular phylogenetic studies have shown that Centrospermae is monophyletic. It is equivalent to a clade known as the core Caryophyllales, whenever the latter is defined to exclude the families Rhabdodendraceae, Simmondsiaceae, Physenaceae and Asteropeiaceae.

== See also ==
- Caryophyllineae
