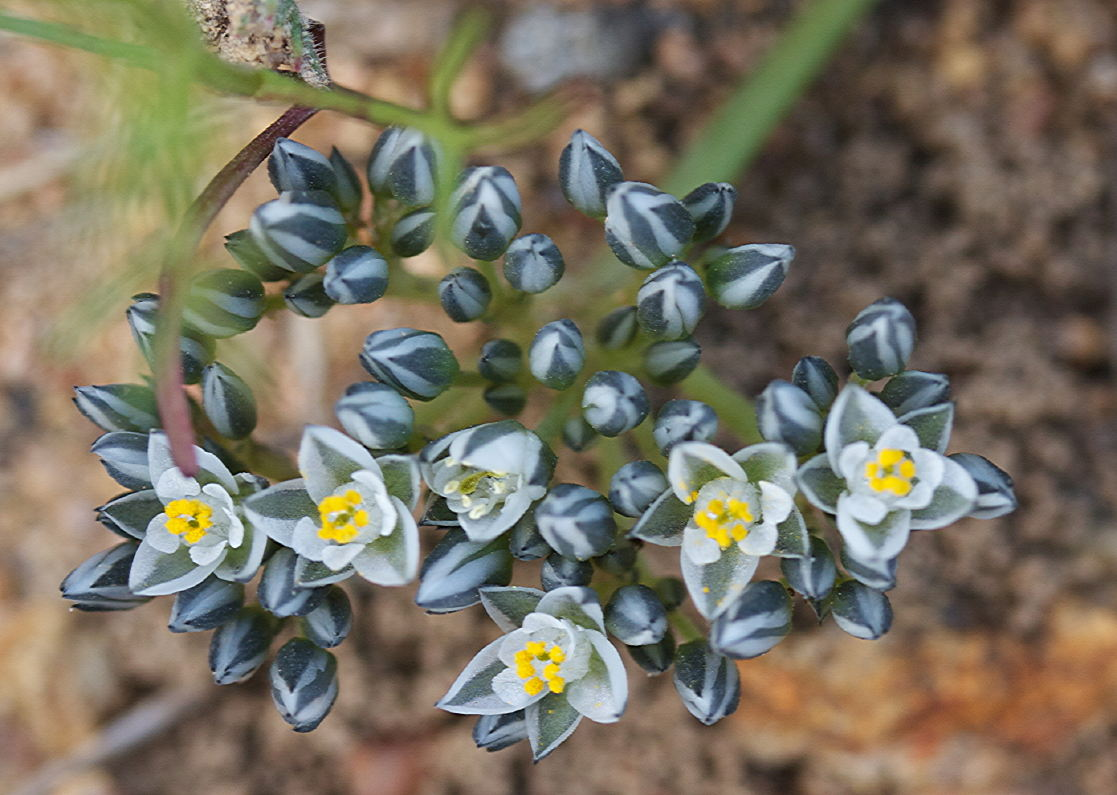
- Limeum africanum

Scientific classification
- Kingdom: Plantae
- Clade: Tracheophytes
- Clade: Angiosperms
- Clade: Eudicots
- Order: Caryophyllales
- Family: Limeaceae; Reveal
- Genus: Limeum; L.

Species
- See text

Synonyms
- List: Acanthocarpea Klotzsch; Dicarpaea C.Presl; Ditroche E.Mey. ex Moq.; Gaudinia J.Gay; Linscotia Adans.; Semonvillea J.Gay

= Limeum =

Genus of flowering plants

Limeum is a genus of flowering plants. It includes 25 species.

The genus Limeum was traditionally recognized as belonging to the family Molluginaceae, but is now treated as the sole genus in the monotypic family Limeaceae. The family is newly recognized through research by the Angiosperm Phylogeny Group III system to deal with long-standing phylogenetic difficulties in placing various genera within the Caryophyllales. Limeum comprises subshrub and herbaceous species native to tropical, eastern and southern Africa, and South Asia. Previously, the genus Macarthuria from Australia was also placed here, but it now is found to belong to Macarthuriaceae.

== Species list ==
Limeum contains the following species:

- Limeum aethiopicum Burm.f.
- Limeum africanum L.
- Limeum angustifolium Verdc.
- Limeum arabicum Friedrich
- Limeum arenicola G.Schellenb.
- Limeum argute-carinatum Wawra
- Limeum deserticola Dinter & G.Schellenb.
- Limeum diffusum (J.Gay) Schinz
- Limeum dinteri G.Schellenb.
- Limeum fenestratum (Fenzl) Heimerl
- Limeum fruticosum Verdc.
- Limeum humifusum Friedrich
- Limeum humile Forssk.
- Limeum katangense Hauman
- Limeum madagascariense Sukhor.
- Limeum myosotis H.Walter
- Limeum obovatum Vicary
- Limeum pauciflorum Moq.
- Limeum praetermissum C.Jeffrey
- Limeum pterocarpum (J.Gay) Heimerl
- Limeum rhombifolium G.Schellenb.
- Limeum subnudum Friedrich
- Limeum sulcatum (Klotzsch) Hutch.
- Limeum telephioides E.Mey. ex Fenzl
- Limeum viscosum (J.Gay) Fenzl
