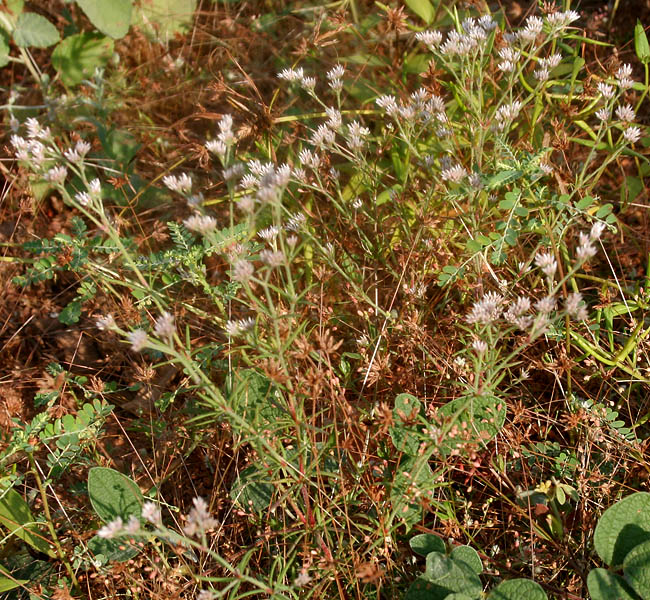
- Polycarpaea corymbosa

Scientific classification
- Kingdom: Plantae
- Clade: Tracheophytes
- Clade: Angiosperms
- Clade: Eudicots
- Order: Caryophyllales
- Suborder: Caryophyllineae

= Caryophyllineae =

Suborder of flowering plants

Caryophyllineae is a suborder of flowering plants.

== Systematics ==
Caryophyllales is separated into 2 sub-orders: Caryophyllineae and Polygonineae. Caryophyllineae contains 21 families and 8,600 species and major families include Aizoaceae, Basellaceae, Caryophyllaceae, Didiereaceae, Phytolaccaceae (including Petiveriaceae), Nyctaginaceae, Molluginaceae, Amaranthaceae (sometimes including Chenopodiaceae), Cactaceae, and Portulacaceae. This roughly constitutes the Caryophyllales as defined before the Angiosperm Phylogeny Group expanded it to include the plants which can be classified in the Polygonales or Polygonineae (depending on whether they are considered an order or a suborder of Caryophyllales). The Caryophyllineae is sometimes called "core Caryophyllales" and the Polygonineae is sometimes called the "non-core Caryophyllales".

The core Caryophyllineae sub-order is well-supported with numerous distinctive synapomorphies, such as: 1) sieve tubes of phloem with plastids with peripheral ring of proteinaceous filaments (often with a central protein crystal), 2) presence of betalains, 3) loss of the rpl2 intron in cpDNA, 4) single whorl of tepals, 5) pollen with spinulose and tubuliferous/punctate exine, 6) placentation free-central to basal, curved embryo, and 7) presence of perisperm with endosperm scanty or lacking.

== See also ==
- Centrospermae
