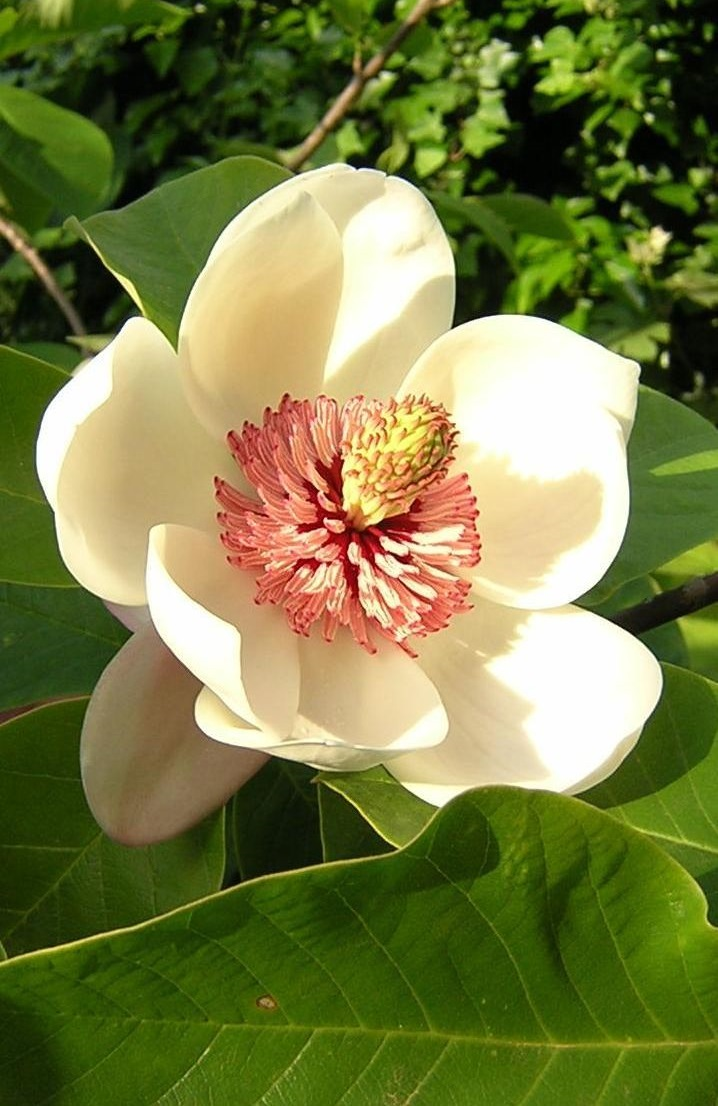
- A Magnolia flower, showing all the parts

Scientific classification
- Kingdom: Plantae
- Clade: Tracheophytes
- Clade: Angiosperms
- Clade: Magnoliids
- Order: Magnoliales; Juss. ex Bercht. & J.Presl

Families
- Annonaceae Juss.; Degeneriaceae I.W.Bailey & A.C.Sm.; Eupomatiaceae Orb.; Himantandraceae Diels; Magnoliaceae Juss.; Myristicaceae R.Br.

= Magnoliales =

Magnoliales Temporal range: Aptian - recent

Basal order of flowering plants

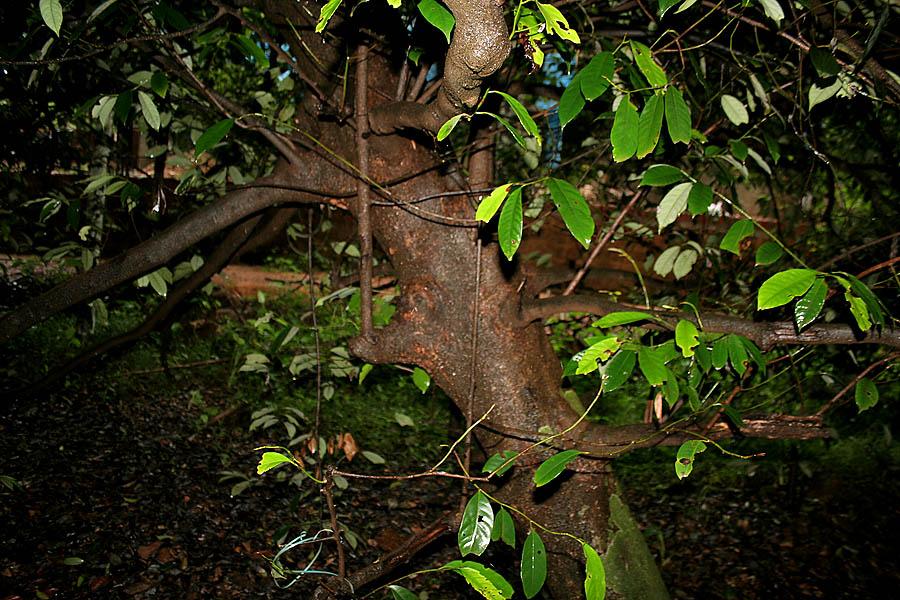
Myristica fragrans tree from Myristicaceae in Goa, India

The Magnoliales are an order of flowering plants. Well-known members of Magnoliales include: magnolias, tulip trees, custard apples, American pawpaw, cherimoyas, ylang-ylang, soursop fruit, and nutmeg.

== Classification ==
The Magnoliales include six families:

- Annonaceae (custard apple family, over 2000 species of trees, shrubs, and lianas; mostly tropical but some temperate)
- Degeneriaceae (two species of trees found on Pacific islands)
- Eupomatiaceae (three species of trees and shrubs found in New Guinea and eastern Australia)
- Himantandraceae (two species of trees and shrubs, found in tropical areas in Southeast Asia and Australia)
- Magnoliaceae (about 225 species including magnolias and tulip trees)
- Myristicaceae (several hundred species including nutmeg)

=== APG system ===
The APG system (1998), APG II system (2003), APG III system (2009), and APG IV system (2016) place this order in the clade magnoliids, circumscribed as follows:

order Magnoliales

family Annonaceae
family Degeneriaceae
family Eupomatiaceae
family Himantandraceae
family Magnoliaceae
family Myristicaceae

- Magnoliids
  - - Canellales
    - Piperales
  - - - Magnoliales
        - Myristicaceae
        - - Magnoliaceae
          - - - Degeneriaceae
              - Himantandraceae
            - - Eupomatiaceae
              - Annonaceae
    - Laurales

The current composition and phylogeny of the Magnoliales.

In these systems, published by the APG, the Magnoliales are a basal group, excluded from the eudicots.

=== Earlier systems ===
The Cronquist system (1981) placed the order in the subclass Magnoliidae of class Magnoliopsida (=dicotyledons) and used this circumscription:

- order Magnoliales
  - family Annonaceae
  - family Austrobaileyaceae
  - family Canellaceae
  - family Degeneriaceae
  - family Eupomatiaceae
  - family Himantandraceae
  - family Lactoridaceae
  - family Magnoliaceae
  - family Myristicaceae
  - family Winteraceae

The Thorne system (1992) placed the order in superorder Magnolianae, subclass Magnoliidae (= dicotyledons), in the class Magnoliopsida (= angiosperms) and used this circumscription (including the plants placed in order Laurales and Piperales by other systems):

- order Magnoliales
  - family Amborellaceae
  - family Annonaceae
  - family Aristolochiaceae
  - family Austrobaileyaceae
  - family Calycanthaceae
  - family Canellaceae
  - family Chloranthaceae
  - family Degeneriaceae
  - family Eupomatiaceae
  - family Gomortegaceae
  - family Hernandiaceae
  - family Himantandraceae
  - family Illiciaceae
  - family Lactoridaceae
  - family Lauraceae
  - family Magnoliaceae
  - family Monimiaceae
  - family Myristicaceae
  - family Piperaceae
  - family Saururaceae
  - family Schisandraceae
  - family Trimeniaceae
  - family Winteraceae

The Engler system, in its update of 1964, placed the order in subclassis Archychlamydeae in class Dicotyledoneae (=dicotyledons) and used this circumscription:

- order Magnoliales
  - family Amborellaceae
  - family Annonaceae
  - family Austrobaileyaceae
  - family Calycanthaceae
  - family Canellaceae
  - family Cercidiphyllaceae
  - family Degeneriaceae
  - family Eupomatiaceae
  - family Eupteleaceae
  - family Gomortegaceae
  - family Hernandiaceae
  - family Himantandraceae
  - family Illiciaceae
  - family Lauraceae
  - family Magnoliaceae
  - family Monimiaceae
  - family Myristicaceae
  - family Schisandraceae
  - family Trimeniaceae
  - family Tetracentraceae
  - family Trochodendraceae
  - family Winteraceae

The Wettstein system, latest version published in 1935, did not use this name although it had an order with a similar circumscription with the name Polycarpicae. This was placed in the Dialypetalae in subclass Choripetalae of class Dicotyledones. (See also Sympetalae).

From the above it will be clear that the plants included in this order by APG have always been seen as related. They have always been placed in the order Magnoliales (or a predecessor). The difference is that earlier systems have also included other plants, which have been moved to neighbouring orders (in the magnoliids) by APG.
