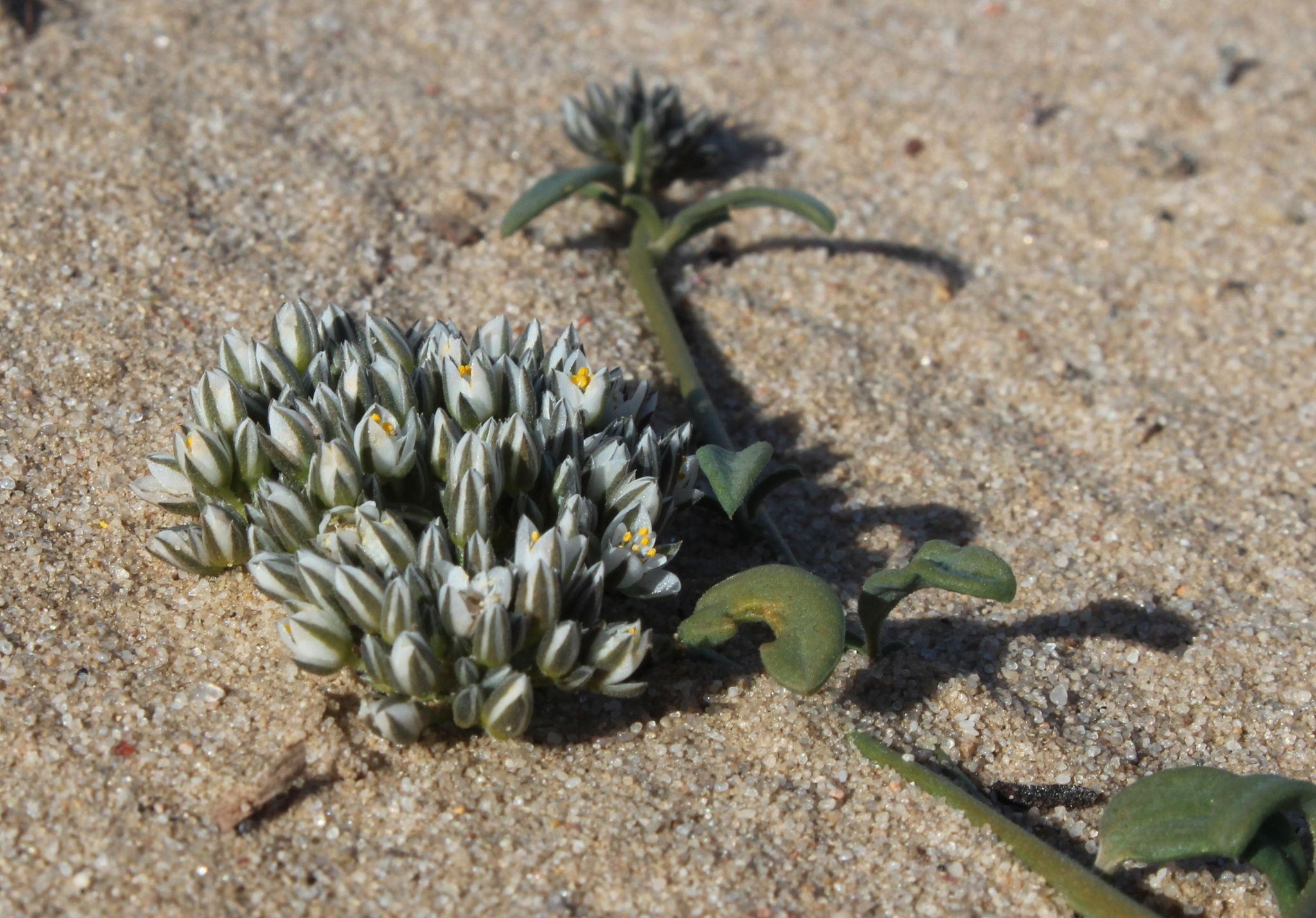

Conservation status
- Least Concern (SANBI Red List)

Scientific classification
- Kingdom: Plantae
- Clade: Tracheophytes
- Clade: Angiosperms
- Clade: Eudicots
- Order: Caryophyllales
- Family: Limeaceae
- Genus: Limeum
- Species: L. africanum

Binomial name
- Limeum africanum L.

= Limeum africanum =

Flowering plant endemic to Southern Africa

Limeum africanum is a species of flowering plant in the genus Limeum. It is endemic to Southern Africa. It is also known by the names common lizardfoot and koggelmandervoet; Afrikaans for the foot of a lizard from the genus Agama.

== Distribution ==
Limeum africanum is found in Mpumalanga, the Northern Cape and the Western Cape. It is also found in Botswana.

== Subspecies ==
There are 2 infraspecific named subspecies of africanum:

- Limeum africanum L. subsp. africanum
- Limeum africanum L. subsp. canescens (E.Mey. ex Fenzl) Friedrich - Found in Namaqualand.

== Conservation status ==
Limeum africanum is classified as Least Concern.
