= Wettstein system =

System of plant taxonomy

A system of plant taxonomy, the Wettstein system recognised the following main groups, according to Richard Wettstein's Handbuch der Systematischen Botanik (1901–1924).

== 3rd edition (1924) ==
=== Outline ===
Synopsis

- Flagellatae p. 65
- Myxophyta p. 69
- Schizophyta
  - Schizophyceae
  - Schizomycetes
- Zygophyta
  - Peridinieae
  - Bacillarieae
    - Centricae
    - Pennatae
  - Conjugatae
- Phaeophytae
- Rhodophyta
  - Bangieae
  - Florideae
- Euphallophyta
  - Chlorophyceae
  - Fungi
    - Eumycetes
      - Phycomycetes
      - Ascomycetes
      - Basidiomycetes
    - Lichenes
      - Ascolichenes
      - Basidiolichenes
- Cormophyta
  - Archegoniatae
    - Bryophyta
      - Musci
      - Hepaticae
    - Pteridophyta
      - Psilophytinae
      - Lycopodiinae
      - Psilotinae
      - Equisetinae
      - Isoëtinae
      - Filicinae
      - Cycadofilicinae
  - Anthophyta
    - Gymnospermae
      - Cycadinae
      - Bennettitinae
      - Cordaitinae
      - Gingkoinae
      - Coniferae
      - Gnetinae
    - Angiospermae p. 467
      - Dicotyledones p. 539
        - Choripetalae
          - Monochlamydeae p. 540
          - Dialypetalae
        - Sympetalae
      - Monocotyledones p. 848

=== Scheme ===
- Flagellatae p. 65
- I. phylum Schizophyta
  1. classis Schizophyceae
  2. classis Schizomycetes
- II. phylum Monadophyta
- III. phylum Myxophyta p. 69
- IV. phylum Conjugatophyta
- V. phylum Bacillariophyta
- VI. phylum Conjugatae
- VII. phylum Rhodophyta
  1. classis Bangieae
  2. classis Florideae
- VIII. phylum Euthallophyta
  1. classis Chlorophyceae
  2. classis Fungi
  A. Eumycetes
  1. subclassis Phycomycetes
  2. subclassis Ascomycetes
  3. subclassis Basidiomycetes
  B. Lichenes
  1. subclassis Ascolichenes
  2. subclassis Basidiolichenes
- IX. phylum Cormophyta
  I. divisio Archegoniatae

==== Bryophyta ====
- 1. subdivisio Bryophyta
  1. classis Musci
  2. classis Hepaticae

==== Pteridophyta ====
- 2. subdivisio Pteridophyta
  1. classis Psilophytinae
  2. classis Lycopodiinae
  3. classis Psilotinae
  4. classis Articulatae
  5. classis Filicinae
  II. divisio Anthophyta
  1. subdivisio Gymnospermae
  1. classis Pteridospermae
  2. classis Cycadinae
  3. classis Benettitinae
  4. classis Cordaïtinae
  5. classis Ginkgoinae
  6. classis Coniferae
  7. classis Gnetinae
  2. subdivisio Angiospermae
  1. classis Dicotyledones
  1. subclassis Choripetalae
  A. Monochlamideae
  B. Dialypetalae
  2. subclassis Sympetalae
  2. classis Monocotyledones

==== Gymnospermae ====
- 1. subdivisio Gymnospermae
  1. classis Pteridospermae (fossil only)
  2. classis Cycadinae
  1. familia Cycadaceae
  2. familia Zamiaceae
  3. classis Benettitinae (fossil only)
  4. classis Cordaïtinae (fossil only)
  5. classis Ginkgoinae
  1. familia Ginkgoaceae
  6. classis Coniferae
  1. familia Taxaceae
  2. familia Cupressaceae
  3. familia Abietaceae
  7. classis Gnetinae
  1. familia Ephedraceae
  2. familia Gnetaceae
  3. familia Welwitschiaceae

==== Angiospermae ====
- 2. subdivisio Angiospermae p. 467

===== Dicotyledones =====
- 1. classis Dicotyledones p. 539
  1. subclassis Choripetalae
  A. Monochlamydeae p. 540
  1. ordo Verticillatae
  familia Casuarinaceae
  2. ordo Fagales
  1. familia Betulaceae
  2. familia Fagaceae
  3. ordo Myricales
  familia Myricaceae
  4. ordo Leitneriales
  familia Leitneriaceae
  5. ordo Juglandales
  1. familia Julianiaceae
  2. familia Juglandaceae
  6. ordo Salicales
  familia Salicaceae
  7. ordo Batidales
  familia Batidaceae [sic, now Bataceae]
  8. ordo Balanopsidales
  familia Balanopsidaceae [sic, now Balanopaceae]
  9. ordo Urticales
  1. familia Moraceae
  2. familia Cannabaceae
  3. familia Ulmaceae
  4. familia Eucommiaceae
  5. familia Rhoipteleaceae
  6. familia Urticaceae
  10. ordo Piperales
  familia Piperaceae
  incertae sedis
  familia Saururaceae
  familia Chloranthaceae
  familia Lacistemonaceae
  11. ordo Proteales
  familia Proteaceae
  12. ordo Santalales
  1. familia Santalaceae
  2. familia Grubbiaceae
  3. familia Opiliaceae
  4. familia Octoknemaceae
  5. familia Olacaceae
  6. familia Myzodendraceae
  7. familia Loranthaceae
  8. familia Balanophoraceae
  9. familia Cynomoriaceae
  13. ordo Polygonales
  familia Polygonaceae
  14. ordo Centrospermae
  1. familia Chenopodiaceae
  2. familia Amaranthaceae
  3. familia Phytolaccaceae
  4. familia Thelygonaceae
  5. familia Nyctaginaceae
  6. familia Aizoaceae
  7. familia Cactaceae
  [sic]
  9. familia Portulacaceae
  10. familia Basellaceae
  11. familia Caryophyllaceae
  15. ordo Tricoccae
  1. familia Euphorbiaceae
  2. familia Daphniphyllaceae
  3. familia Dichapetalaceae
  4. familia Buxaceae
  5. familia Callitrichaceae
  16. ordo Hamamelidales
  1. familia Hamamelidaceae
  2. familia Cercidiphyllaceae
  3. familia Eupteleaceae
  4. familia Platanaceae
  5. familia Myrothamnaceae
  [sic]
  B. Dialypetalae
  18. ordo Polycarpicae
  1. familia Magnoliaceae
  2. familia Trochodendraceae
  3. familia Lactoridaceae
  4. familia Himantandraceae
  5. familia Eupomatiaceae
  6. familia Anonaceae [sic, now: Annonaceae]
  7. familia Myristicaceae
  8. familia Canellaceae
  9. familia Aristolochiaceae
  10. familia Rafflesiaceae
  11. familia Hydnoraceae
  12. familia Calycanthaceae
  13. familia Gomortegaceae
  14. familia Monimiaceae
  15. familia Lauraceae
  16. familia Hernandiaceae
  17. familia Menispermaceae
  18. familia Lardizabalaceae
  19. familia Ranunculaceae
  20. familia Berberidaceae
  21. familia Nymphaeaceae
  22. familia Ceratophyllaceae
  incertae sedis
  23. familia Nepenthaceae
  24. familia Cephalotaceae
  25. familia Sarraceniaceae
  19. ordo Rhoeadales
  1. familia Papaveraceae
  2. familia Tovariaceae
  3. familia Capparidaceae [sic, now Capparaceae]
  4. familia Cruciferae
  5. familia Resedaceae
  6. familia Moringaceae
  20. ordo Parietales
  1. familia Cistaceae
  2. familia Bixaceae
  3. familia Cochlospermaceae
  4. familia Tamaricaceae
  5. familia Fouquieriaceae
  6. familia Frankeniaceae
  7. familia Elatinaceae
  8. familia Droseraceae
  9. familia Violaceae
  10. familia Flacourtiaceae
  11. familia Stachyuraceae
  12. familia Turneraceae
  13. familia Malesherbiaceae
  14. familia Passifloraceae
  15. familia Achariaceae
  16. familia Caricaceae
  17. familia Loasaceae
  18. familia Begoniaceae
  19. familia Datiscaceae
  20. familia Ancistrocladaceae
  21. ordo Guttiferales
  1. familia Dilleniaceae
  2. familia Actinidiaceae
  3. familia Ochnaceae
  4. familia Strassburgeriaceae
  5. familia Eucryphiaceae
  6. familia Caryocaraceae
  7. familia Marcgraviaceae
  8. familia Quiinaceae
  9. familia Theaceae
  10. familia Guttiferae
  11. familia Dipterocarpaceae
  22. ordo Rosales
  1. familia Crassulaceae
  2. familia Saxifragaceae
  3. familia Cunoniaceae
  4. familia Brunelliaceae
  5. familia Myrothamnaceae
  6. familia Pittosporaceae
  7. familia Byblidaceae
  8. familia Roridulaceae
  9. familia Bruniaceae
  10. familia Podostemonaceae
  11. familia Hydrostachyaceae
  12. familia Rosaceae
  13. familia Crossosomataceae
  14. familia Chrysobalanaceae
  15. familia Connaraceae
  16. familia Mimosaceae
  17. familia Papilionaceae
  23. ordo Myrtales
  1. familia Penaeaceae
  2. familia Geissolomaceae
  3. familia Oliniaceae
  4. familia Thymelaeaceae
  5. familia Elaeagnaceae
  6. familia Lythraceae
  7. familia Heteropyzidaceae
  8. familia Sonneratiaceae
  9. familia Rhizophoraceae
  10. familia Alangiaceae
  11. familia Nyssaceae
  12. familia Lecythidaceae
  13. familia Combretaceae
  14. familia Myrtaceae
  15. familia Punicaceae
  16. familia Melastomataceae
  17. familia Oenotheraceae
  18. familia Halorrhagidaceae [sic: now Haloragaceae]
  19. familia Gunneraceae
  incertae sedis
  familia Hippuridaceae
  24. ordo Columniferae
  1. familia Malvaceae
  2. familia Bombacaceae
  3. familia Tiliaceae
  4. familia Sterculiaceae
  5. familia Elaeocarpaceae
  incertae sedis
  familia Chlaenaceae
  familia Gonystylaceae
  familia Scytopetalaceae
  25. ordo Gruinales
  1. familia Linaceae
  2. familia Humiriaceae
  3. familia Oxalidaceae
  4. familia Geraniaceae
  5. familia Limnaceae
  6. familia Tropaeolaceae
  7. familia Erythroxylaceae
  8. familia Malpighiaceae
  9. familia Zygophyllaceae
  incertae sedis
  familia Cneoraceae
  26. ordo Terebinthales
  1. familia Rutaceae
  2. familia Simarubaceae [sic: now Simaroubaceae]
  3. familia Burseraceae
  4. familia Meliaceae
  5. familia Tremandraceae
  6. familia Polygalaceae
  7. familia Xanthophyllaceae
  8. familia Trigoniaceae
  9. familia Vochysiaceae
  10. familia Anacardiaceae
  11. familia Sapindaceae
  12. familia Akaniaceae
  13. familia Aextoxicaceae
  14. familia Aceraceae
  15. familia Hippocastanaceae
  16. familia Coriaceae
  17. familia Cyrillaceae
  18. familia Pentaphylacaceae
  19. familia Sabiaceae
  20. familia Melianthaceae
  21. familia Corynocarpaceae
  22. familia Balsaminaceae
  27. ordo Celastrales
  1. familia Aquifoliaceae
  2. familia Celastraceae
  3. familia Salvadoraceae
  4. familia Staphyleaceae
  5. familia Hippocrateaceae
  6. familia Stackhousiaceae
  7. familia Icacinaceae
  28. ordo Rhamnales
  1. familia Rhamnaceae
  2. familia Vitaceae
  29. ordo Umbelliflorae
  1. familia Cornaceae
  2. familia Araliaceae
  3. familia Umbelliferae
  incertae sedis
  ordo Garryales
  familia Garryaceae
  2. subclassis Sympetalae p. 754
  1. ordo Plumbaginales
  familia Plumbaginaceae
  2. ordo Primulales
  1. familia Theophrastaceae
  2. familia Primulaceae
  3. familia Myrsinaceae
  3. ordo Bicornes
  1. familia Clethraceae
  2. familia Pirolaceae
  3. familia Ericaceae
  4. familia Empetraceae
  5. familia Epacridaceae
  6. familia Diapensiaceae
  4. ordo Diospyrales
  1. familia Ebenaceae
  2. familia Hoplestigmataceae
  3. familia Styracaceae
  4. familia Symplocaceae
  5. familia Sapotaceae
  5. ordo Tubiflorae
  1. familia Convolvulaceae
  2. familia Cuscutaceae
  3. familia Polemoniaceae
  4. familia Hydrophyllaceae
  5. familia Lennoaceae
  6. familia Boraginaceae
  7. familia Nolanaceae
  8. familia Solanaceae
  9. familia Scrophulariaceae
  10. familia Lentibulariaceae
  11. familia Orobranchaceae
  12. familia Gesneriaceae
  13. familia Bignoniaceae
  14. familia Pedaliaceae
  15. familia Martyniaceae
  16. familia Acanthaceae
  17. familia Verbenaceae
  18. familia Labiatae
  19. familia Tetrachondraceae
  20. familia Globulariaceae
  21. familia Phrymaceae
  22. familia Myoporaceae
  23. familia Plantaginaceae
  incertae sedis
  familia Columelliaceae
  6. ordo Contortae
  1. familia Loganiaceae
  2. familia Buddleiaceae
  3. familia Gentianaceae
  4. familia Menyanthaceae
  5. familia Apocynaceae
  6. familia Asclepiadaceae
  7. ordo Ligustrales
  familia Oleaceae
  8. ordo Rubiales
  1. familia Rubiaceae
  2. familia Caprifoliaceae
  3. familia Adoxaceae
  4. familia Valerianaceae
  5. familia Dipsacaceae
  6. familia Calyceraceae
  9. ordo Cucurbitales
  familia Cucurbitaceae
  10. ordo Synandrae
  1. familia Campanulaceae
  2. familia Lobeliaceae
  3. familia Goodeniaceae
  4. familia Stylidaceae
  5. familia Brunoniaceae
  6. familia Compositae

===== Monocotyledones =====
- II. classis Monocotyledones p. 848
  1. familia Alismataceae
  2. familia Butomaceae
  3. familia Hydrocharitaceae
  4. familia Scheuchzeriaceae
  5. familia Aponogetonaceae
  6. familia Potamogetonaceae
  7. familia Najadaceae
  2. ordo Liliiflorae p. 862
  1. familia Liliaceae p. 863
  subfamilia A. Melanthoideae p. 866
  subfamilia B. Herrerioideae
  subfamilia C. Asphodeloideae
  subfamilia D. Allioideae p. 868
  subfamilia E. Lilioideae p. 869
  subfamilia F. Dracaenoideae
  subfamilia G. Asparagoideae
  subfamilia H. Ophiopogonoideae p. 870
  subfamilia I. Aletroideae
  subfamilia K. Luzuriagoideae
  subfamilia L. Smilacoideae
  2. familia Stemonaceae p. 870
  3. familia Cyanastraceae
  4. familia Pontederiaceae
  5. familia Haemodoraceae
  6. familia Philydraceae
  7. familia Amaryllidaceae p. 871
  subfamilia A. Amaryllidoideae p. 874
  subfamilia B. Agavoideae
  subfamilia C. Hypoxidoideae
  8. familia Velloziaceae
  9. familia Iridaceae
  10. familia Juncaceae
  11. familia Flagellariaceae
  12. familia Rapateaceae
  13. familia Thurniaceae
  14. familia Bromeliaceae
  15. familia Dioscoreaceae p. 880
  16. familia Taccaceae
  17. familia Burmanniaceae p. 882
  3. ordo Enantioblastae p. 883
  1. familia Commelinaceae
  2. familia Mayacaceae
  3. familia Xyridaceae
  4. familia Eriocaulaceae
  5. familia Centrolepidaceae
  6. familia Restionaceae
  4. ordo Cyperales p. 888
  familia Cyperaceae
  5. ordo Glumiflorae p. 891
  familia Gramineae
  6. ordo Scitamineae p. 902
  1. familia Musaceae
  2. familia Zingiberaceae p. 904
  3. familia Cannaceae
  4. familia Marantaceae p. 906
  7 ordo Gynandrae p. 907
  familia Orchidaceae
  8. ordo Spadiciflorae
  1. familia Palmae
  2. familia Cyclanthaceae
  3. familia Araceae
  4. familia Lemnaceae
  9. ordo Pandanales
  1. familia Pandanaceae
  2. familia Sparganiaceae
  3. familia Typhaceae

== Bibliography ==
- Wettstein, Richard (1924). Handbuch der Systematischen Botanik 2 vols (3rd ed.). Archived from the original on 18 February 2015.
  - 1st ed. 1901–1908 Vol. I 1901, Vol. II 1908
  - 2nd ed. 1910–1911
  - 3rd ed. 1923–1924 Archived 2015-02-18 at the Wayback Machine
    - Index Archived 2015-11-25 at the Wayback Machine
  - 4th ed. 1933–1935

=== Reviews ===
First edition

- B. M. Davis. Handbook of systemic botany. Botanical Gazette. Vol. 32, No. 1 (July, 1901), pp. 61-62 Part 1
- Charles J. Chamberlain. Handbook of systemic botany. Botanical Gazette. Vol. 37, No. 1 (Jan., 1904), pp. 68-69 Part 2
- Charles J. Chamberlain. Wettstein's Handbuch. Botanical Gazette. Vol. 45, No. 1 (Jan., 1908), p. 58 Part 3

Second edition

- Charles J. Chamberlain. Wettstein's Handbuch. Botanical Gazette. Vol. 52, No. 5 (Nov., 1911), p. 405
