= Glumaceae =

Group of flowering plants

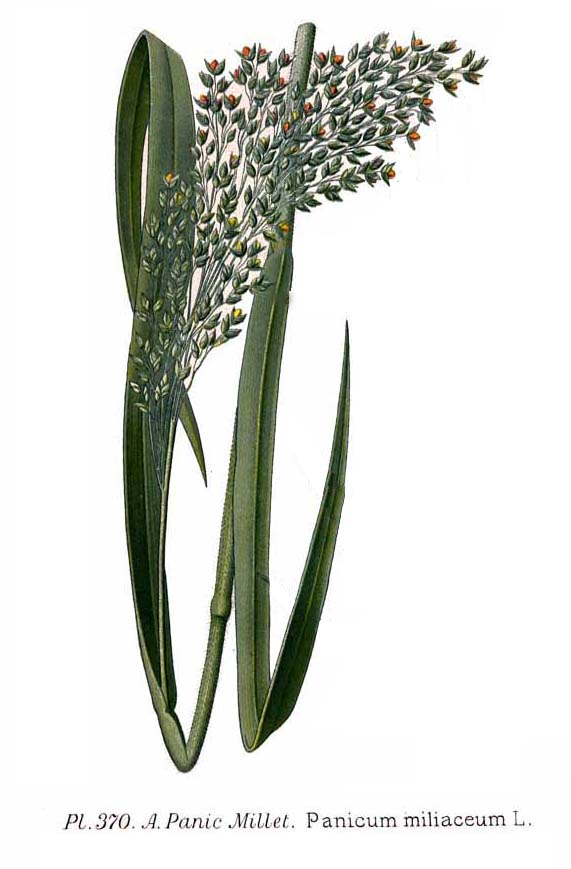
Panicum dichotomiflorum, a member of the grass family

Glumaceae is a descriptive botanical name. It was used in the Bentham & Hooker system (volume of 1883) for the order including the grass family:

- order Glumaceae
  family Eriocauleae
  family Centrolepideae
  family Restionaceae
  family Cyperaceae
  family Gramineae (Poaceae)

The APG II system places the plants involved (and many others) in the order Poales. Other names for the order including the grass family are Glumiflorae and Graminales.
