= Columniferae =

Group of flowering plants

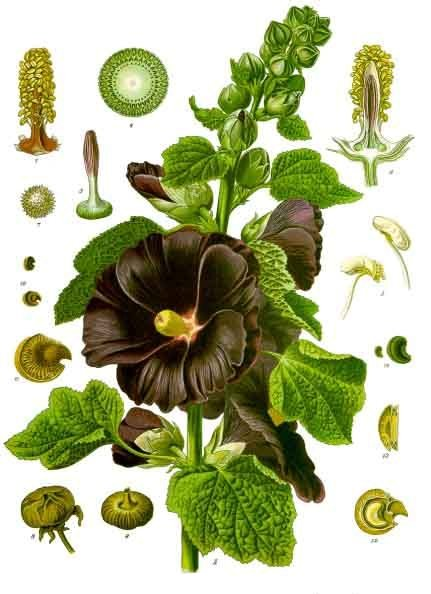
Alcea rosea.

Columniferae is a descriptive botanical name. The Wettstein system used this name for an order of flowering plants, with the following circumscription:

- order Columniferae
  familia Malvaceae
  familia Bombacaceae
  familia Tiliaceae
  familia Sterculiaceae
  familia Elaeocarpaceae

That is, its circumscription is identical to the order Malvales as used in the 1981 version of the Cronquist system. The APG II system, used here, includes all the plants in the first four families in the expanded family Malvaceae sensu lato.
