= Plumbaginales =

Order of plants

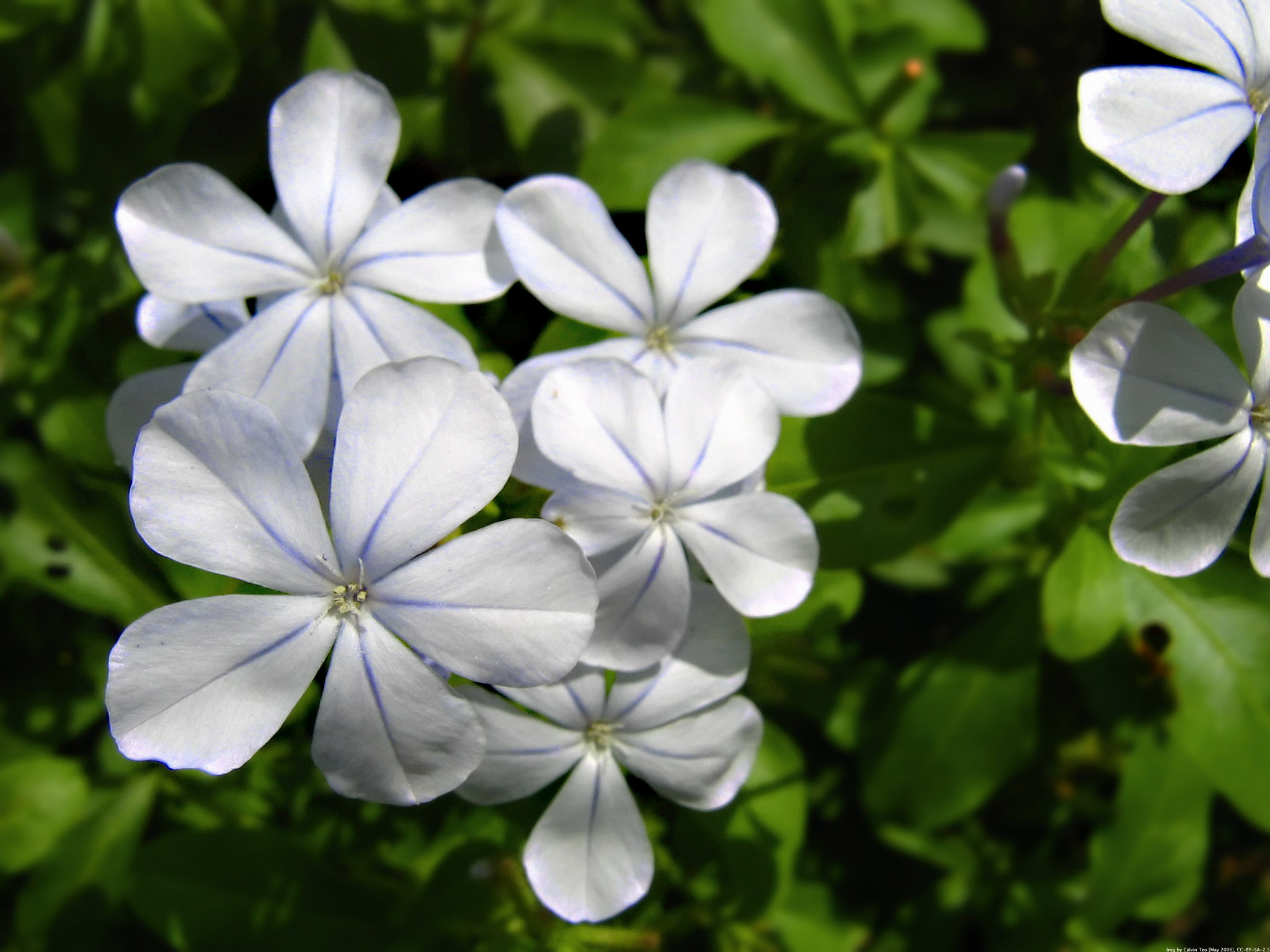
flowers of Plumbago

Plumbaginales is an order of flowering plants. The order is recognized by several systems, such as the Wettstein system, last revised in 1935, the Engler system, in its update of 1964 and the Cronquist system, 1981. Its circumscription is typically:

- order Plumbaginales
  family Plumbaginaceae

Cronquist placed this order in his subclass Caryophyllidae of three orders.
