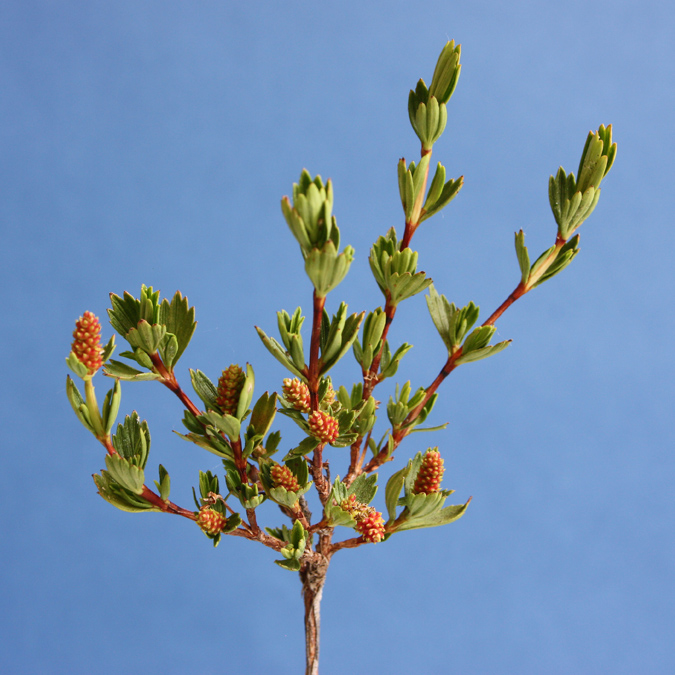

Scientific classification
- Kingdom: Plantae
- Clade: Tracheophytes
- Clade: Angiosperms
- Clade: Eudicots
- Order: Gunnerales
- Family: Myrothamnaceae
- Genus: Myrothamnus
- Species: M. flabellifolius

Binomial name
- Myrothamnus flabellifolius Welw. Ann. Cons. Ultramar. (Portugal), Parte Não Off. ser. 1, 55:578. 1859 ("1858") (Apont.)

= Myrothamnus flabellifolius =

Species of plant of Southern Africa

Myrothamnus flabellifolius is a species of flowering plant in the family Myrothamnaceae native to central and southern Africa. It is also called the resurrection plant for the appearance of dead leaves reviving during rain (see poikilohydry).

3,4,5-Tri-O-galloylquinic acid is a tannin found in M. flabellifolius.

== Description ==
Myrothamnus flabellifolius is a small, resinous plant whose shoot reaches 200–1,200 mm (8–47 in) in height. It is found in single bundles and in colonies with extensive root systems. During the winter, plants are known to lose all of their leaves and remain bare until the first rainfall.

Plants in their hydrated state are noticeably larger than when dehydrated. They can fold their leaves and stems to reduce light absorption. Thylakoid membranes are stacked on top of each other to reduce photo-oxidative stress. While mesophyll cells fold their cell wall in response to desiccation, sclerenchyma and vascular cells do not fold, providing support for the plant. When water is reintroduced, it is absorbed through the roots, as the folded leaves are unable to absorb any water. Water transport is aided by lipids in the xylem, which prevent cavitation and support rehydration.

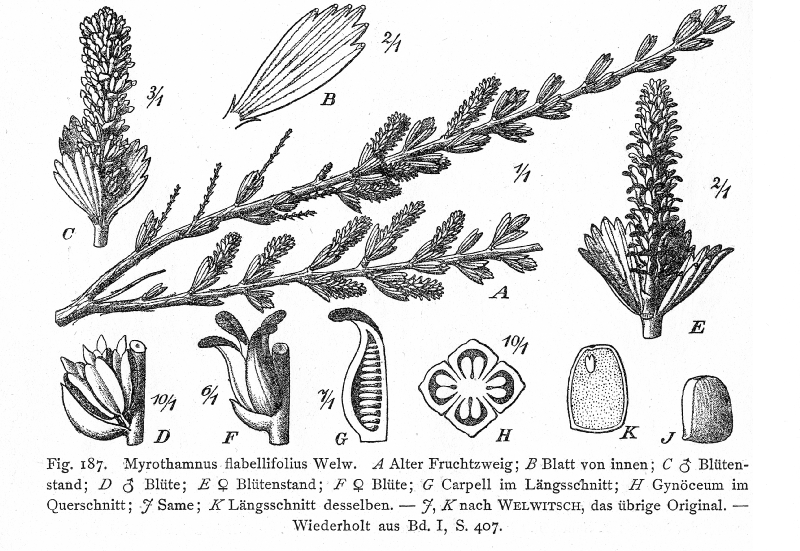
M. flabellifolius, from Vegetation der Erde (1915)

== Taxonomy ==
This plant was first described by Friedrich Welwitschs in 1859.

== Environment ==
Myrothamnus flabellifoliusis is found growing along mountain formations in central and southern Africa. It is typically found growing in altitudes between 500–1,900 m (1,640–6,234 ft). The plant grows in regions characterized by high light intensity and extreme temperature changes between night and day. It lives in regions with dry winters and rainy summers, though the lengths of these periods varies drastically between regions.

Myrothamnus flabellifoliusis can also be found in shallow, rocky outcrops with soil depths of around 15 cm (5.9 in). The roots of the plant expand to intercept water found in the hollow spaces between the rock. Erosion debris is typically found surrounding its root system.

== Uses ==
=== Cultural uses ===
Because of its ability to produce flowers after months of dormancy, Myrothamnus flabellifolius has been called the resurrection plant. It is a symbol of hope in some African cultures, where its leaves and stems are commonly used to make tea, spices, and lotions.

=== Medical uses ===
M. flabellifolius is used by traditional village medicine men in Africa to treat coughs, influenza, mastitis, backaches, kidney disorders, hemorrhoids, and abdominal pains. When smoked, it has been shown to alleviate chest pains and symptoms of depression. Chewing the leaves is used to help with halitosis and gingivitis.

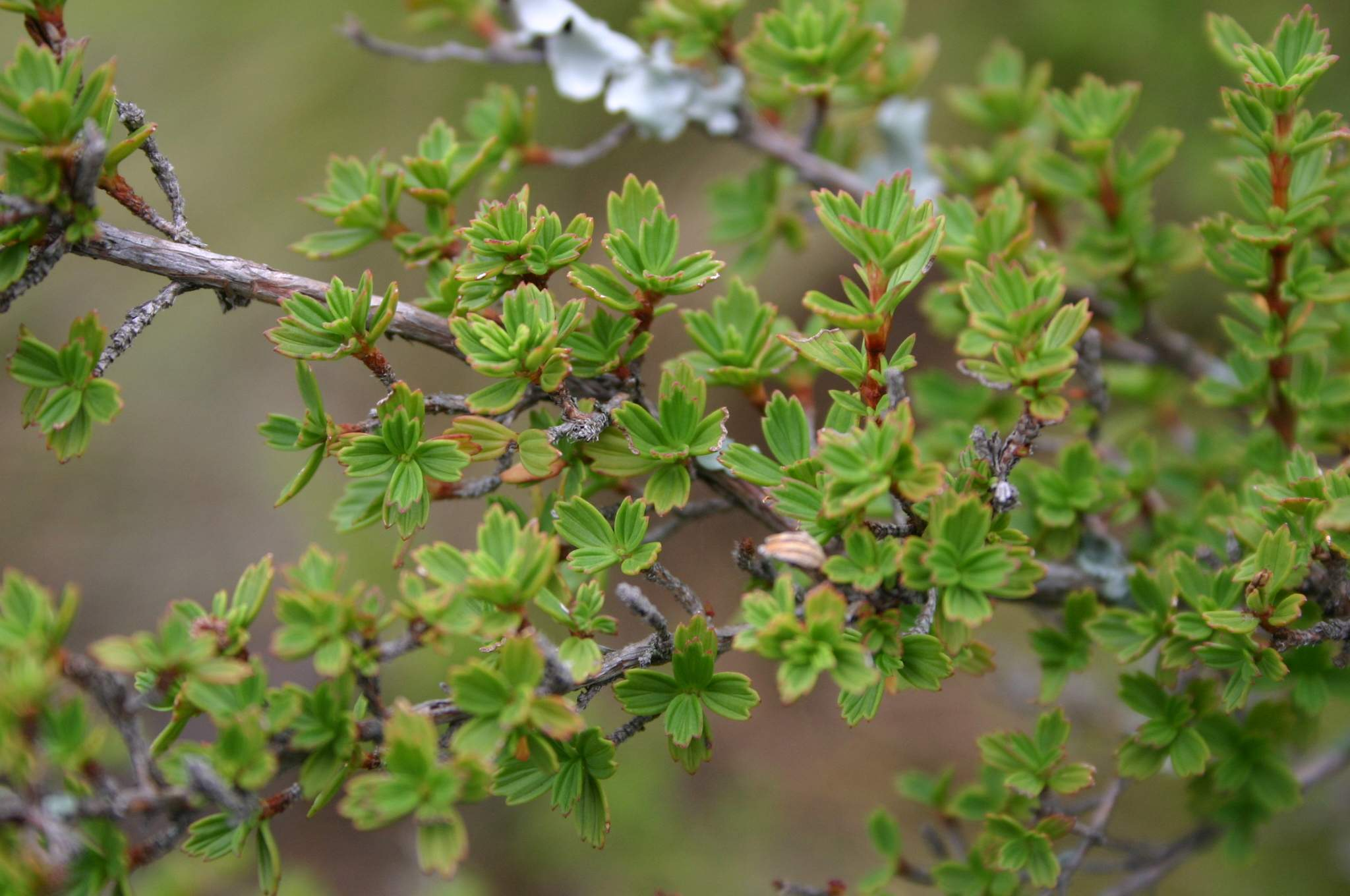
