= Glumiflorae =

Group of flowering plants

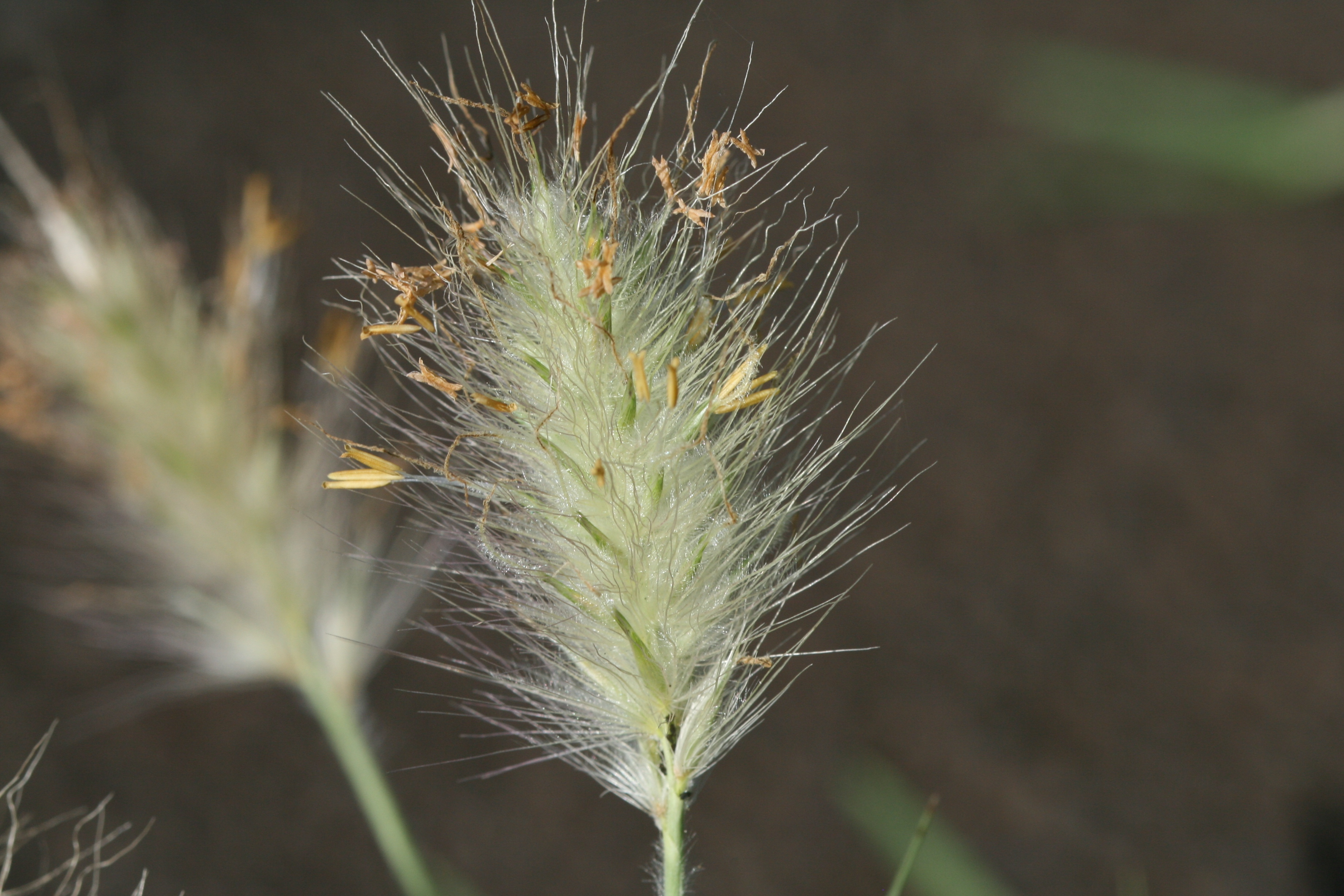
The grass Pennisetum villosum

Glumiflorae (gluma = husk + florae = flowers) is a descriptive botanical name. It was used in the Wettstein system for an order of flowering plants. The order consisted of one family only:

- order Glumiflorae
  family Gramineae

The APG II system, used here, assigns the grass family to the order Poales. Other names for the order including the grass family are Glumaceae and Graminales.

However, this name Glumiflorae was used in the Hutchinson system (first edition, first volume, 1926) for a taxon (above the rank of order) that included the grass family.
