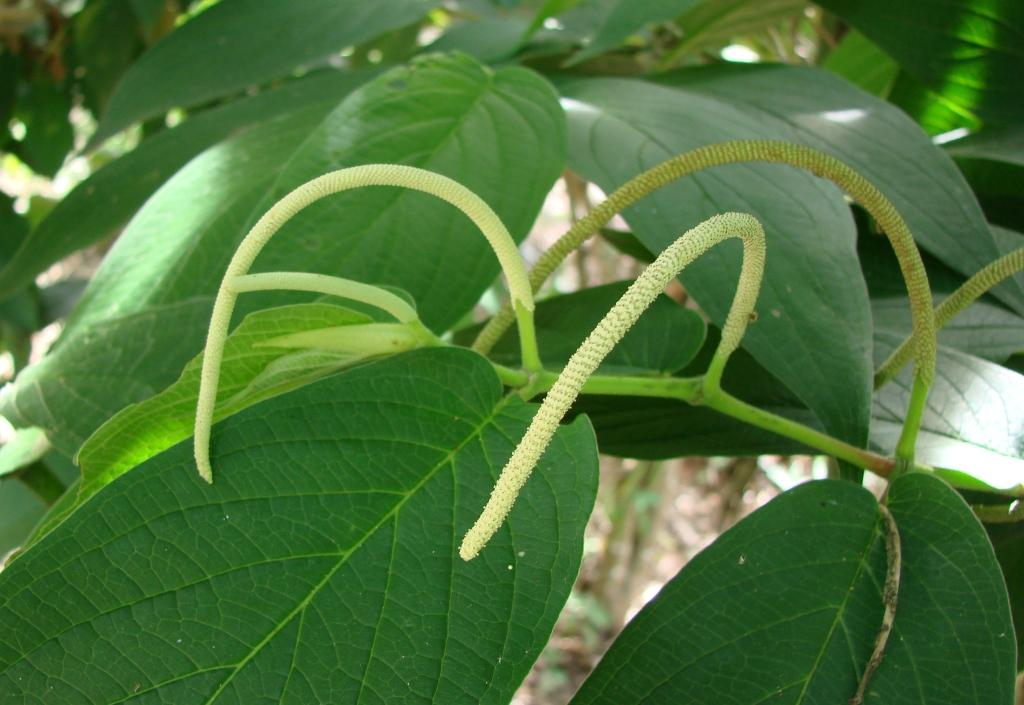
- Piper aduncum

Scientific classification
- Kingdom: Plantae
- Clade: Tracheophytes
- Clade: Angiosperms
- Clade: Magnoliids
- Order: Piperales; Bercht. & J.Presl

Families
- Aristolochiaceae; Piperaceae; Saururaceae

Synonyms
- Aristolochiales de Jussieu ex von Berchtold & Presl 1820; Asarales Horan. 1847; Hydnorales Takhtajan ex Reveal 1992; Lactoridales Takhtajan ex Reveal 1993; Saururales von Martius 1835

= Piperales =

Piperales Temporal range: Aptian - recent

Order of flowering plants

Piperales is an order of flowering plants (4,170 recognized species). It necessarily includes the family Piperaceae but other taxa have been included or disincluded variously over time. Well-known plants which may be included in this order include black pepper, kava, the many Peperomias, pepper elder, lizard's tail, birthwort, and wild ginger. The two perianthless families Piperaceae and Saururaceae are mainly herbaceous plants possessing highly reduced flowers.

== Classification ==
=== APG system ===
In the APG IV system, of 2016, this order is placed in the clade magnoliids and is circumscribed as follows:

- order Piperales
  family Aristolochiaceae (including Asaraceae, Hydnoraceae and Lactoridaceae)
  family Piperaceae
  family Saururaceae

- Magnoliids
  - - Canellales
    - - Piperales
        - Aristolochiaceae
        - - Piperaceae
          - Saururaceae
  - - Laurales
    - Magnoliales

The current composition and phylogeny of the Piperales.

This is an expansion from the APG system, of 1998, which used the same placement (in the magnoliids) but used this circumscription:

- order Piperales
  family Aristolochiaceae
  family Lactoridaceae
  family Piperaceae
  family Saururaceae

=== Earlier systems ===
The Cronquist system, of 1981, placed the order in the subclass Magnoliidae of class Magnoliopsida [=dicotyledons] and used this circumscription:

- order Piperales
  family Chloranthaceae
  family Piperaceae
  family Saururaceae

The Engler system, in its update of 1964, placed the order in subclassis Archichlamydeae in class Dicotyledoneae [=dicotyledons] and used this circumscription:

- order Piperales
  family Chloranthaceae
  family Lactoridaceae
  family Piperaceae
  family Saururaceae

The Wettstein system, latest version published in 1935, assigned the order to the Monochlamydeae in subclass Choripetalae of class Dicotyledones. It used the circumscription:

- order Piperales
  family Piperaceae
