= Ordo naturalis =

Historical botanical term; family in taxonomy

In botany, the phrase ordo naturalis, 'natural order', was once used for what today is a family. Its origins lie with Carl Linnaeus who used the phrase when he referred to natural groups of plants in his lesser-known work, particularly Philosophia Botanica. In his more famous works the Systema Naturae and the Species Plantarum, plants were arranged according to his artificial "Sexual system", and Linnaeus used the word ordo for an artificial unit. In those works, only genera and species (sometimes varieties) were "real" taxa.

In nineteenth-century works such as the Prodromus of de Candolle and the Genera Plantarum of Bentham & Hooker, the word ordo did indicate taxa that are now given the rank of family. Contemporary French works used the word famille for these same taxa. In the first international Rules of botanical nomenclature of 1906 the word family (familia) was assigned to this rank, while the term order (ordo) was reserved for a higher rank, for what in the nineteenth century had often been named a cohors (plural cohortes).

The International Code of Nomenclature for algae, fungi, and plants provides for names published in the rank of ordo naturalis in Art 18.2: normally, these are to be accepted as family names.

Some plant families retain the name they were given by pre-Linnaean authors, recognised by Linnaeus as "natural orders" (e.g. Palmae or Labiatae). Such names are known as descriptive family names.
