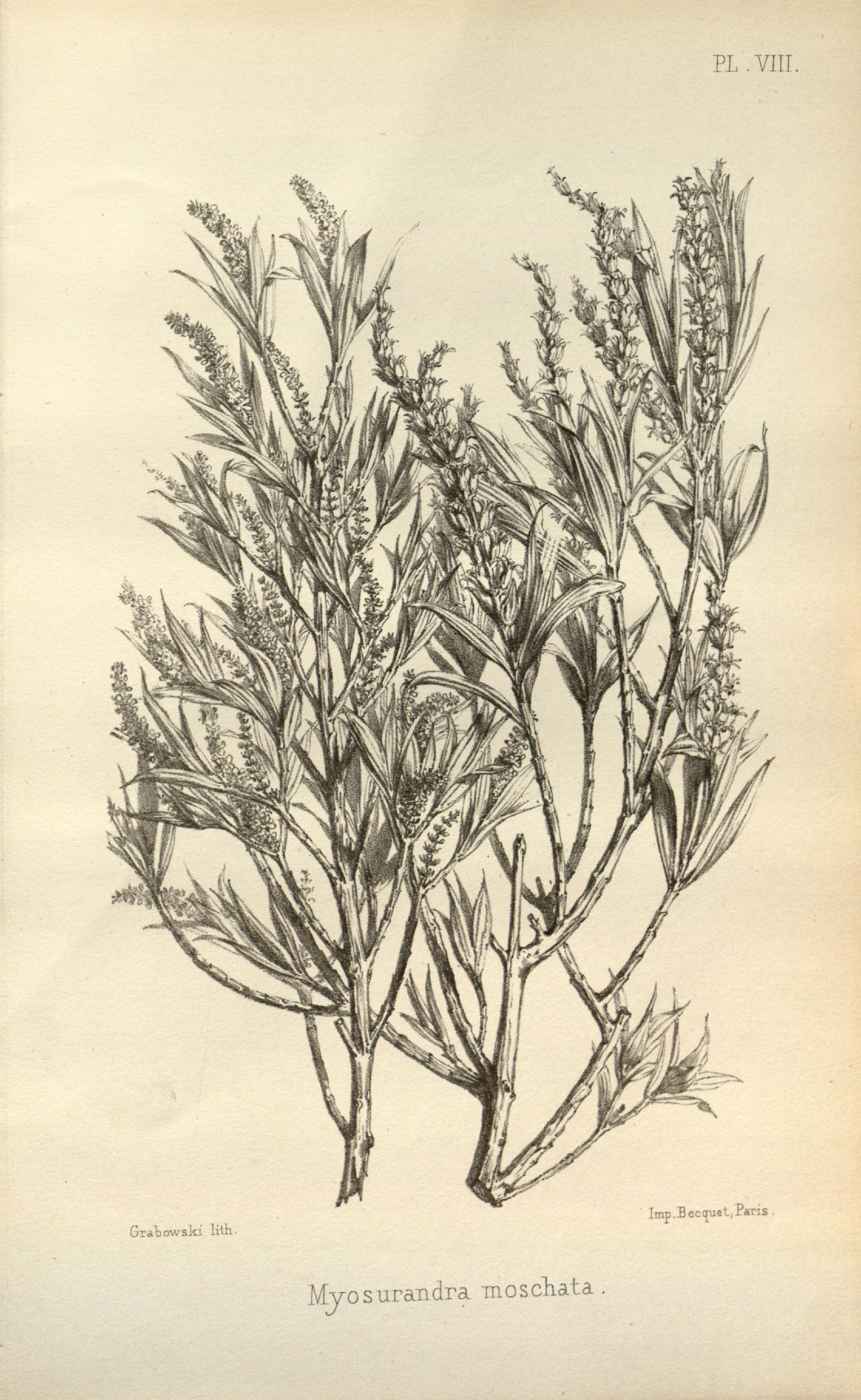

Scientific classification
- Kingdom: Plantae
- Clade: Tracheophytes
- Clade: Angiosperms
- Clade: Eudicots
- Order: Gunnerales
- Family: Myrothamnaceae
- Genus: Myrothamnus
- Species: M. moschata

Binomial name
- Myrothamnus moschata (Baill.) Baill. ex Nied.

Synonyms
- Myosurandra moschata

= Myrothamnus moschata =

Species of plant

Myrothamnus moschata is a plant species in the genus Myrothamnus.
