= Choripetalae =

Subclass of flowering plants

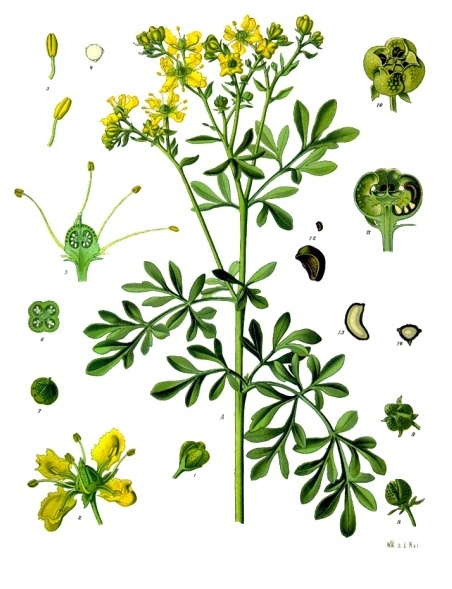
Ruta graveolens, an example of a choripetalous flower.

Choripetalae Eichler (1876), is a descriptive botanical name used in the Eichler and Wettstein systems to categorize a group of flowering plants. It represents one of two subdivisions within the Dicotyledones, with the other being the Sympetalae. The latter have fused petals (sympetaly) which distinguishes them from the free, unfused petals of the Choripetalae.

Thus if the petals are free from one another in the corolla, the plant is polypetalous or choripetalous; whereas for those petals at least partially fused together, it is gamopetalous or sympetalous.

== See also ==
- Petal
