= Polygonales =

Order of plants

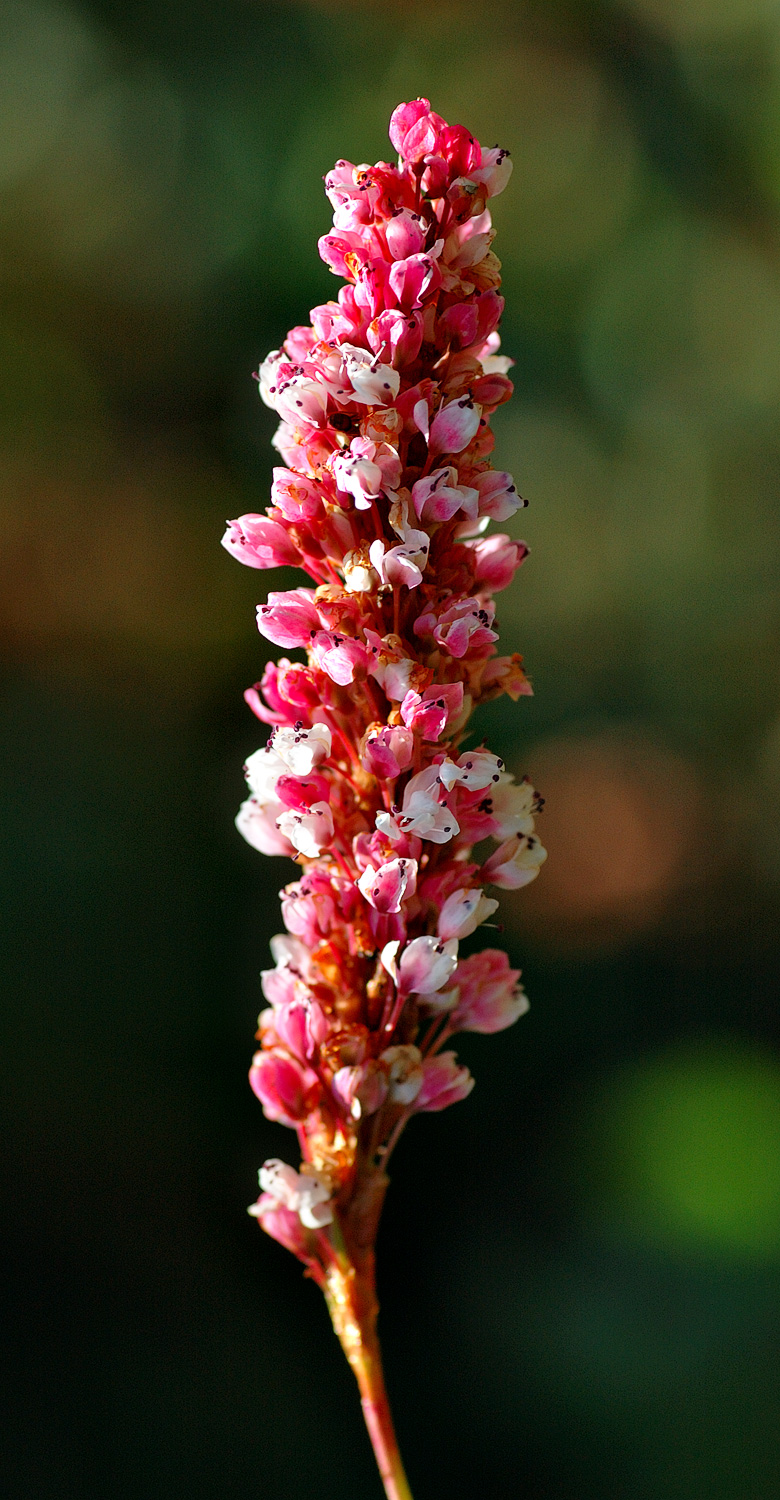
Inflorescence

Polygonales was an order of flowering plants recognized by several older systems such as the Wettstein system, last revised in 1935, the Engler system, in its update of 1964, and the Cronquist system, 1981. Its circumscription was typically:

- order Polygonales
  family Polygonaceae

In these systems the order is placed close to the order Caryophyllales (or its predecessor Centrospermae). Cronquist placed this order in his subclass Caryophyllidae of three orders. Dahlgren placed the order Polygonales within the superorder Polygoniflorae, alternatively Polygonanae.
