= Physena =

Scientific classification
- Kingdom: Plantae
- Clade: Tracheophytes
- Clade: Angiosperms
- Clade: Eudicots
- Order: Caryophyllales
- Family: Physenaceae; Takht.
- Genus: Physena; Noronha ex Thouars

Species
- Physena madagascariensis Steud.; Physena sessiliflora Tul.

Genus of shrubs

Physena is the sole genus of the flowering plant family Physenaceae. It contains two species of shrubs and small trees which are endemic to Madagascar. The APG II system, of 2003 (unchanged from the APG system, of 1998), does recognize this family and assigns it to the order Caryophyllales in the clade core eudicots.
