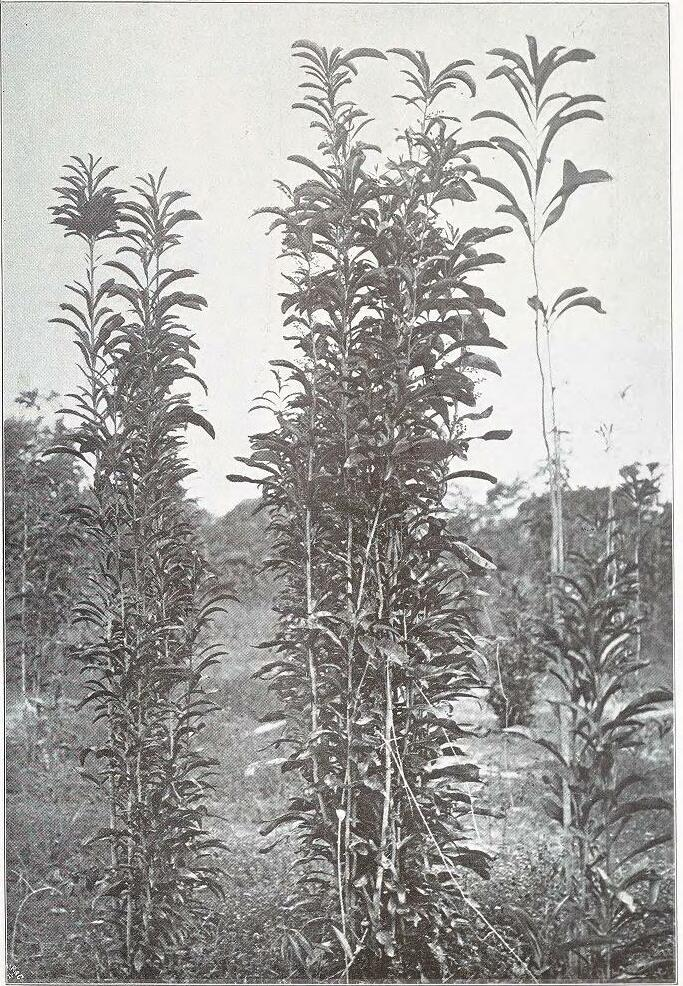
- Rhabdodendron macrophyllum

Scientific classification
- Kingdom: Plantae
- Clade: Tracheophytes
- Clade: Angiosperms
- Clade: Eudicots
- Order: Caryophyllales
- Family: Rhabdodendraceae; Prance
- Genus: Rhabdodendron; Gilg & Pilg.

= Rhabdodendron =

Genus of trees

Rhabdodendron is a genus of flowering plant in the monotypic family Rhabdodendraceae. It comprises three species of tropical South American trees.

- Rhabdodendron amazonicum

- Rhabdodendron gardnerianum

- Rhabdodendron macrophyllum

It is placed in its own family, Rhabdodendraceae, which has only been recognized for the past few decades. The 2003 APG II system (unchanged from the 1998 APG system) assigned it to the order Caryophyllales in the clade core eudicots. The 1981 Cronquist system placed it in the order Rosales. Before the creation of the family Rhabdodendraceae, the genus Rhabdodendron had a very lively history as to taxonomic placement.
