= Contortae =

Term in botanical taxonomy

Contortae as a term has appeared in several senses in botanical taxonomy, most conspicuously as follows:

== Order Contortae ==
Order Contortae is no longer recognized in botanical taxonomy. After a varied history in the nineteenth century, predominant opinion on the Contortae assigned several families to the order in the mid twentieth century, though never with unanimity. They typically included:

- Apocynaceae (now assigned to the Gentianales)
- Asclepiadaceae (now included in the Apocynaceae)
- Buddlejaceae (now assigned to the Scrophulariales)
- Gentianaceae (now assigned to the Gentianales)
- Loganiaceae (now assigned to the Gentianales)
- Menyanthaceae (now assigned to the Asterales)
- Oleaceae (now assigned to the Lamiales)

By the late twentieth century there were moves to withdraw recognition of the plant order Contortae, and merge it with the order Gentianales or Loganiales (which now is regarded as a synonym of Gentianales). For details of the reassignment of the families to orders, see the Angiosperm Phylogeny Group publication

== Other occurrences of the term ==
Contortae is a section of the genus Oenothera.

Contortae is a section in the family Acanthaceae.

Contortae is a subsection of the genus Pinus.
