= Hamamelidales =

Order of flowering plants

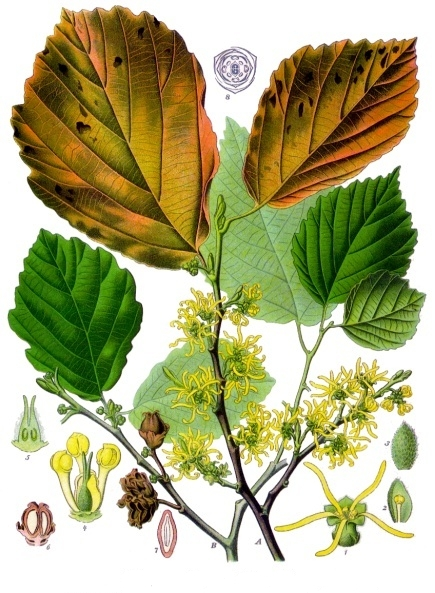
Hamamelis virginiana, a member of the family Hamamelidaceae

Hamamelidales is an order of flowering plants formerly accepted in a number of systems of plant taxonomy, including the Cronquist system published in 1968 and 1988. The order is not currently accepted in the Angiosperm Phylogeny Group III system of plant taxonomy, the most widely accepted system as molecular systematic studies have suggested that these families are not closely related to each other. The APG II system (2003) assigns them to several different orders: Hamamelidaceae and Cercidiphyllaceae to Saxifragales, Eupteleaceae to Ranunculales, Platanaceae to Proteales, and Myrothamnaceae to Gunnerales. Additional studies of the chloroplast genome have since confirmed that the families moved into the Saxifragales are closely related.

The Cronquist system (1981) included the order in subclass Hamamelidae with the circumscription:

- order Hamamelidales
  family Hamamelidaceae, now in order Saxifragales
  family Cercidiphyllaceae, now in order Saxifragales
  family Eupteleaceae, now in order Ranunculales
  family Platanaceae, now in order Proteales
  family Myrothamnaceae, now in order Gunnerales
