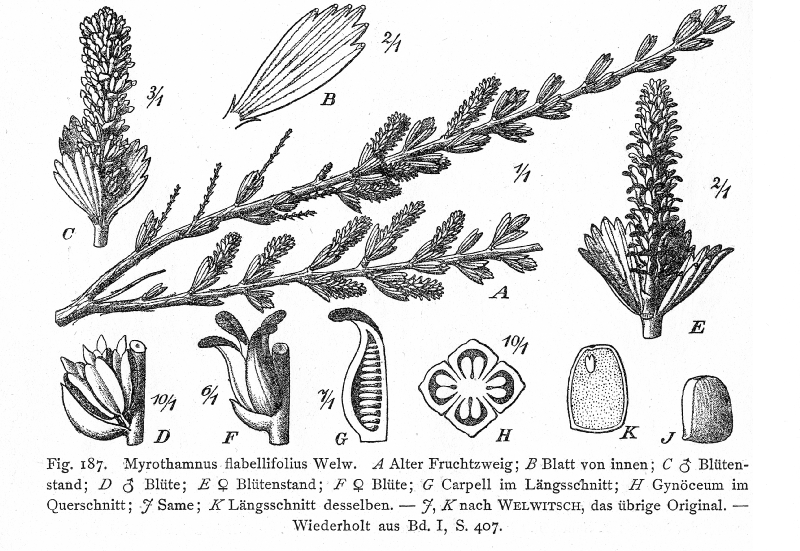
- M. flabellifolia

Scientific classification
- Kingdom: Plantae
- Clade: Tracheophytes
- Clade: Angiosperms
- Clade: Eudicots
- Order: Gunnerales
- Family: Myrothamnaceae; Nied.
- Genus: Myrothamnus; Welw.

Species
- Myrothamnus flabellifolius; Myrothamnus moschata

= Myrothamnus =

Genus of shrubs

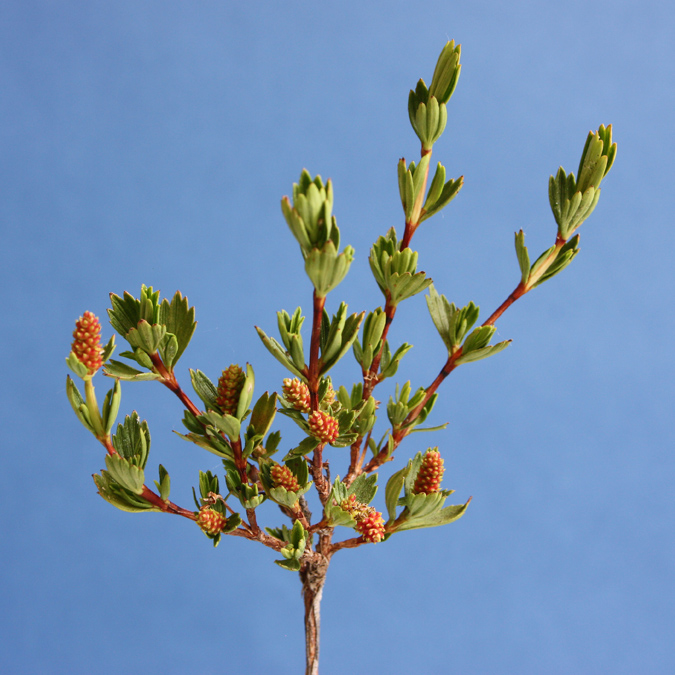

Myrothamnus is a genus of flowering plants, consisting of two species of small xerophytic shrubs, in the southern parts of tropical Africa and in Madagascar. Myrothamnus is recognized as the only genus in the family Myrothamnaceae.

Myrothamnaceae was included in the order Hamamelidales in the Cronquist system. Molecular systematic studies have suggested that Myrothamnus is not closely related to Hamamelidaceae nor any other family included in that order, but rather is closely related to the morphologically very different Gunnera. In the APG II system (2003) the genus is assigned to family Gunneraceae or to the optionally recognized segregate family Myrothamnaceae. In the APG III system (2009) and APG IV system (2016) the narrower circumscription is preferred, and these two families are considered distinct.

== Species ==
Species of Myrothamnus are dioecious shrubs.

- Myrothamnus flabellifolius Welw. - Angola, Southern Africa, Zimbabwe
- Myrothamnus moschata (Baill.) Baill. - Madagascar
