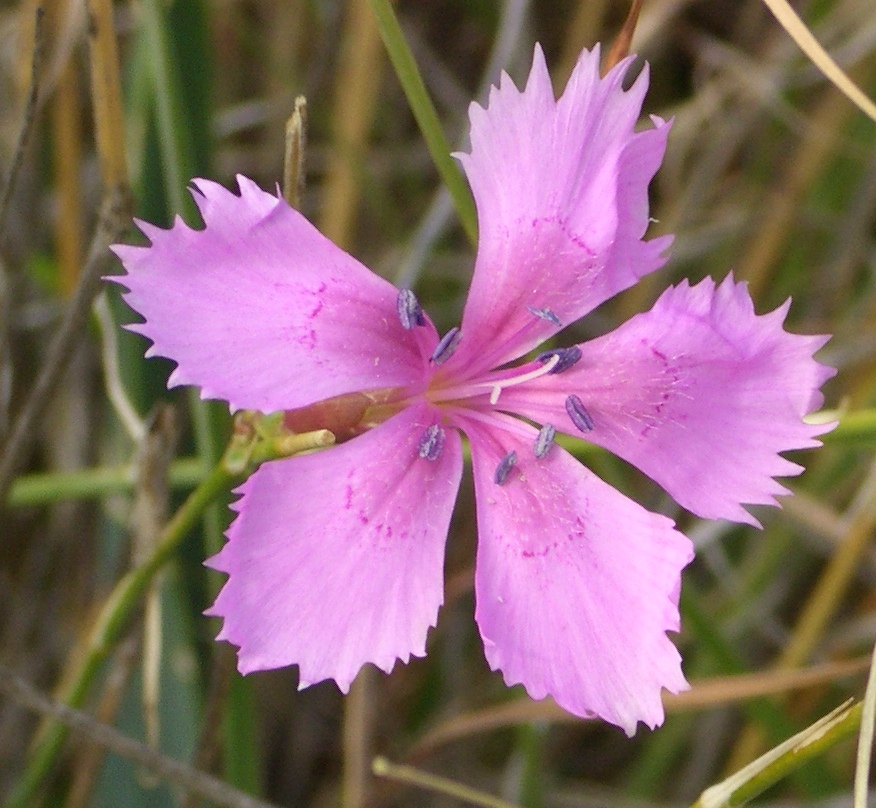
- Dianthus caryophyllus

Scientific classification
- Kingdom: Plantae
- Clade: Embryophytes
- Clade: Tracheophytes
- Clade: Spermatophytes
- Clade: Angiosperms
- Clade: Eudicots
- Clade: Superasterids
- Order: Caryophyllales; Juss. ex Bercht. & J.Presl

Suborders
- Caryophyllineae; Polygonineae; Portulacineae

Synonyms
- Centrospermae

= Caryophyllales =

Order of flowering plants

Caryophyllales (/ˌkæri.oʊfɪˈleɪliːz/ KARR-ee-oh-fih-LAY-leez) is a diverse and heterogeneous order of flowering plants which includes well-known species such as cacti, carnations, beets, quinoa, spinach, amaranths, pigfaces and ice plants, oraches and saltbushes, goosefoots, sundews, Venus flytrap, tropical pitcher plants, Malabar spinach, bougainvilleas, four o'clock flowers, buckwheat, knotweeds, rhubarb, sorrels, purslanes, jojoba, and tamarisks. Many members are succulent, having fleshy stems or leaves.

The production of betalain pigments is unique to members of this order, occurring in all core families – except Caryophyllaceae and Molluginaceae. Non-core families – such as the Nepenthaceae – produce anthocyanins. In its modern definition, the order encompasses an entirely new group of plant families – formerly included in the order Polygonales which do not synthesize betalains – among which several families are carnivorous, including Nepenthaceae and Droseraceae.

According to calculations made using the molecular clock method, the lineage which led Caryophyllales to split from other plants occurred around 111 million years ago.

== Description ==
Members of the Caryophyllales – itself a member of the core eudicots – include approximately 6% of eudicot species; at current, comprising 37 families, 749 genera, and 11,620 species. The monophyletic classification of Caryophyllales is supported by DNA and cytochrome c sequence data, as well as heritable characters – notably, the development of anther walls and vessel-elements with simple perforations.

== Taxonomy and phylogeny ==
As with all taxa, the circumscription of Caryophyllales has changed over time and within various classification systems. All systems recognize a core of families in the order having centrospermous ovules and seeds. More recent analysis has expanded the Caryophyllales to include many carnivorous plants.

Historically, systematists have been undecided on the placement of Caryophyllales, either in the rosid complex or as a sister to the Asterid clade. Possible connections between sympetalous angiosperms and Caryophyllales were presaged by, among others, Bessey, Douglas, Dickson and Hutchinson; with G.H.M. Lawrence supporting Douglas and Dickson's historical relation of fairly conclusive evidence for structural similarities between the gynecia of both Primulaceae and Caryophyllaceae, stating

...the vascular pattern and the presence of locules at the base of the ovary point to the fact that the present much reduced flower of the Primulaceae has descended from an ancestor which was characterized by a plurilocular ovary and axial placentation. This primitive flower might well be found in centrospermal stock as Wernham, Bessy, and Hutchinson have suggested.

Caryophyllales are separated into two suborders; the Caryophyllineae and Polygonineae. These suborders were formerly, and often still are, recognized as two separate orders; the Polygonales and Caryophyllales.

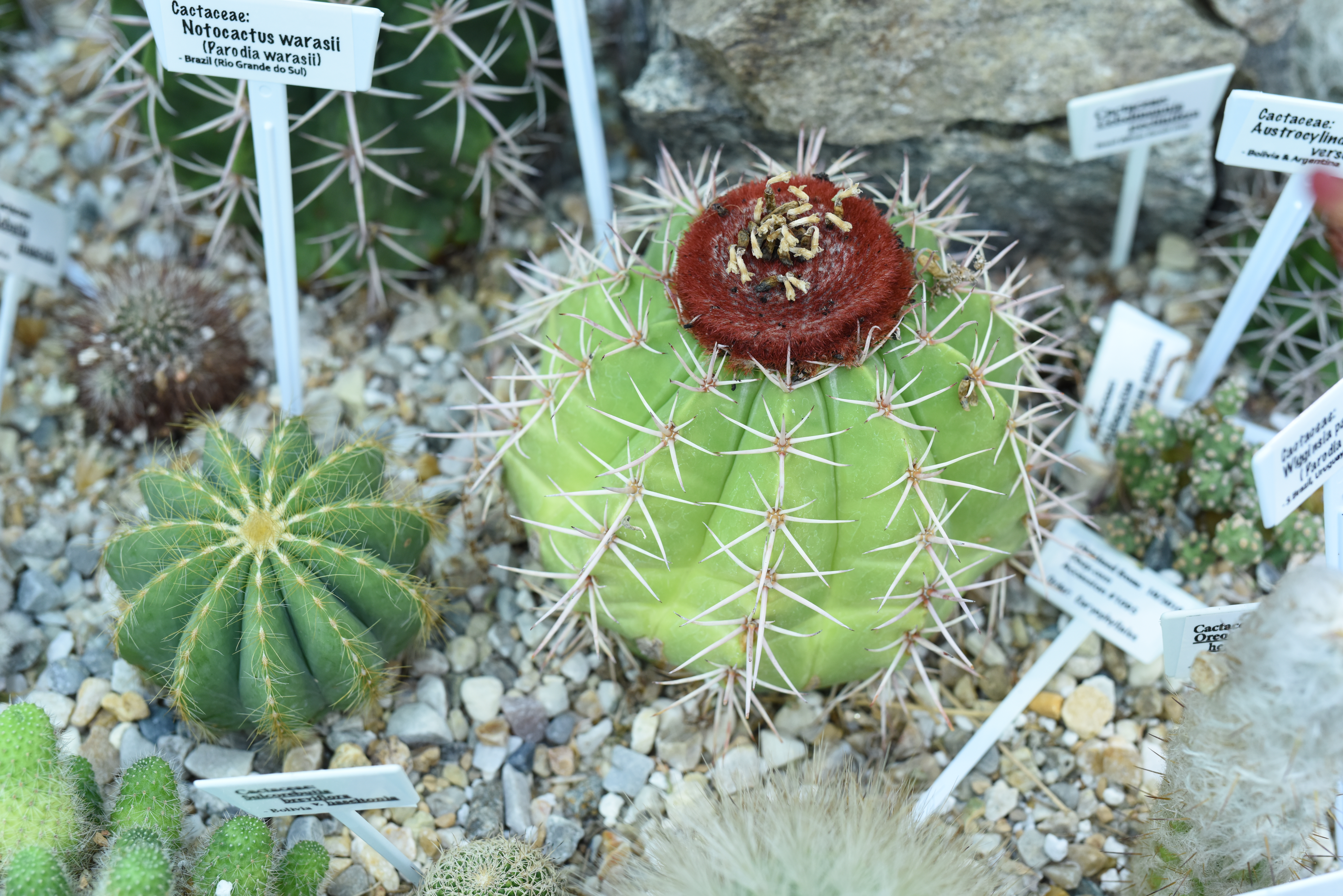
Cactaceae native to the middle region of South America, at Marsh Botanical Garden. Cactaceae are a plant family, under the order Caryophyllales.

=== Angiosperm Phylogeny Group (APG) ===
As of the APG IV system of classification (2016) the order Caryophyllales contains 38 families:

- family Achatocarpaceae
- family Aizoaceae
- family Amaranthaceae
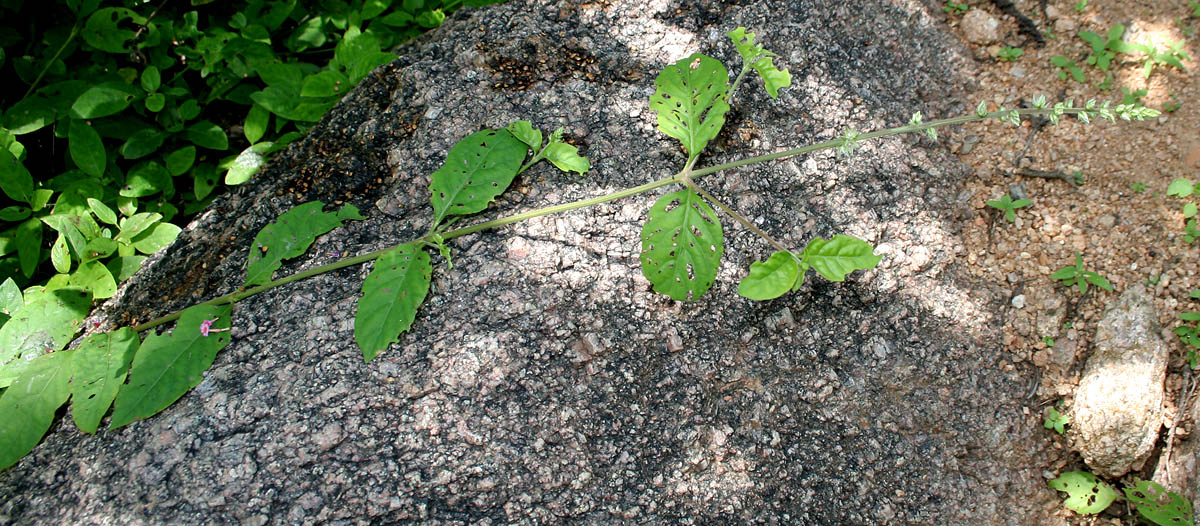
  Pupalia lappacea Forest Burr from family Amaranthaceae
- family Anacampserotaceae (added in APG III)
- family Ancistrocladaceae
- family Asteropeiaceae
- family Barbeuiaceae (added in APG II)
- family Basellaceae
- family Cactaceae
- family Caryophyllaceae
- family Didiereaceae
- family Dioncophyllaceae
- family Droseraceae
- family Drosophyllaceae
- family Frankeniaceae
- family Gisekiaceae (added in APG II)
- family Halophytaceae (added in APG II)
- family Kewaceae (added in APG IV)
- family Limeaceae (added in APG III)
- family Lophiocarpaceae (added in APG III)
- family Macarthuriaceae (added in APG IV)
- family Microteaceae (added in APG IV)
- family Molluginaceae
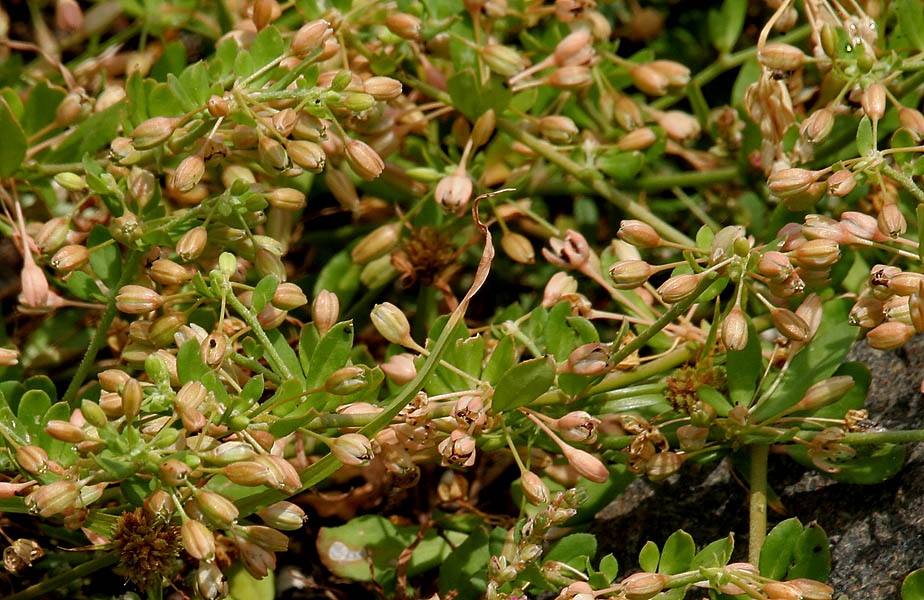
  Glinus oppositifolius from family Molluginaceae
- family Montiaceae (added in APG III)
- family Nepenthaceae
- family Nyctaginaceae
- family Petiveriaceae (added in APG IV)
- family Physenaceae
- family Phytolaccaceae
- family Plumbaginaceae
- family Polygonaceae
- family Portulacaceae
- family Rhabdodendraceae
- family Sarcobataceae
- family Simmondsiaceae
- family Stegnospermataceae
- family Talinaceae (added in APG III)
- family Tamaricaceae

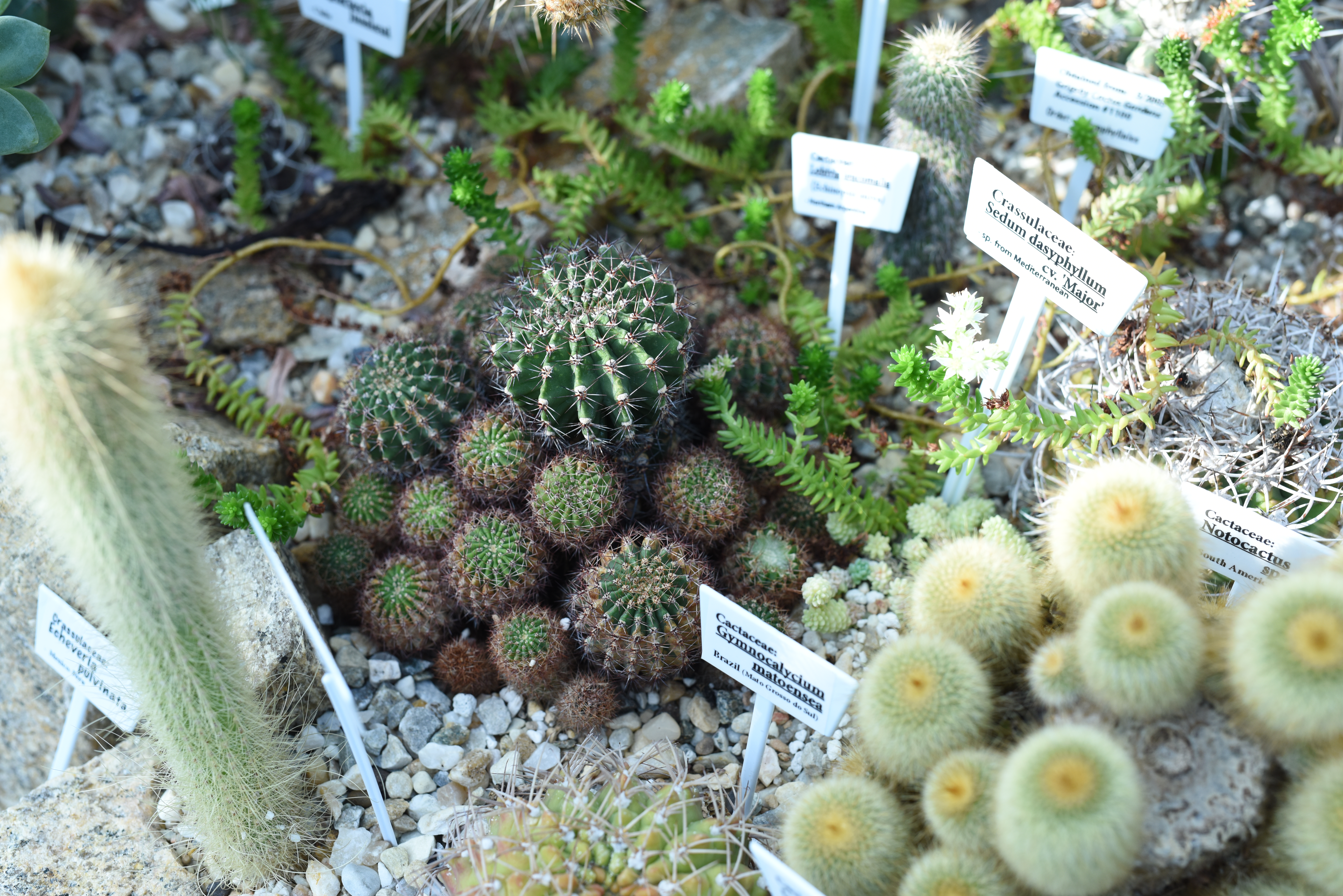
Cactaceaeː Gymnocalycium Matoensea at Yale's Marsh Botanical Garden.

26 of the 38 families were included in the original APG system (1998), with the remaining 12 added during later revisions; three in the APG II system (2003), five in the APG III system (2009), and four in the APG IV system (2016). Families added during APG revisions are noted above.

A flower of Dianthus

=== Cronquist ===
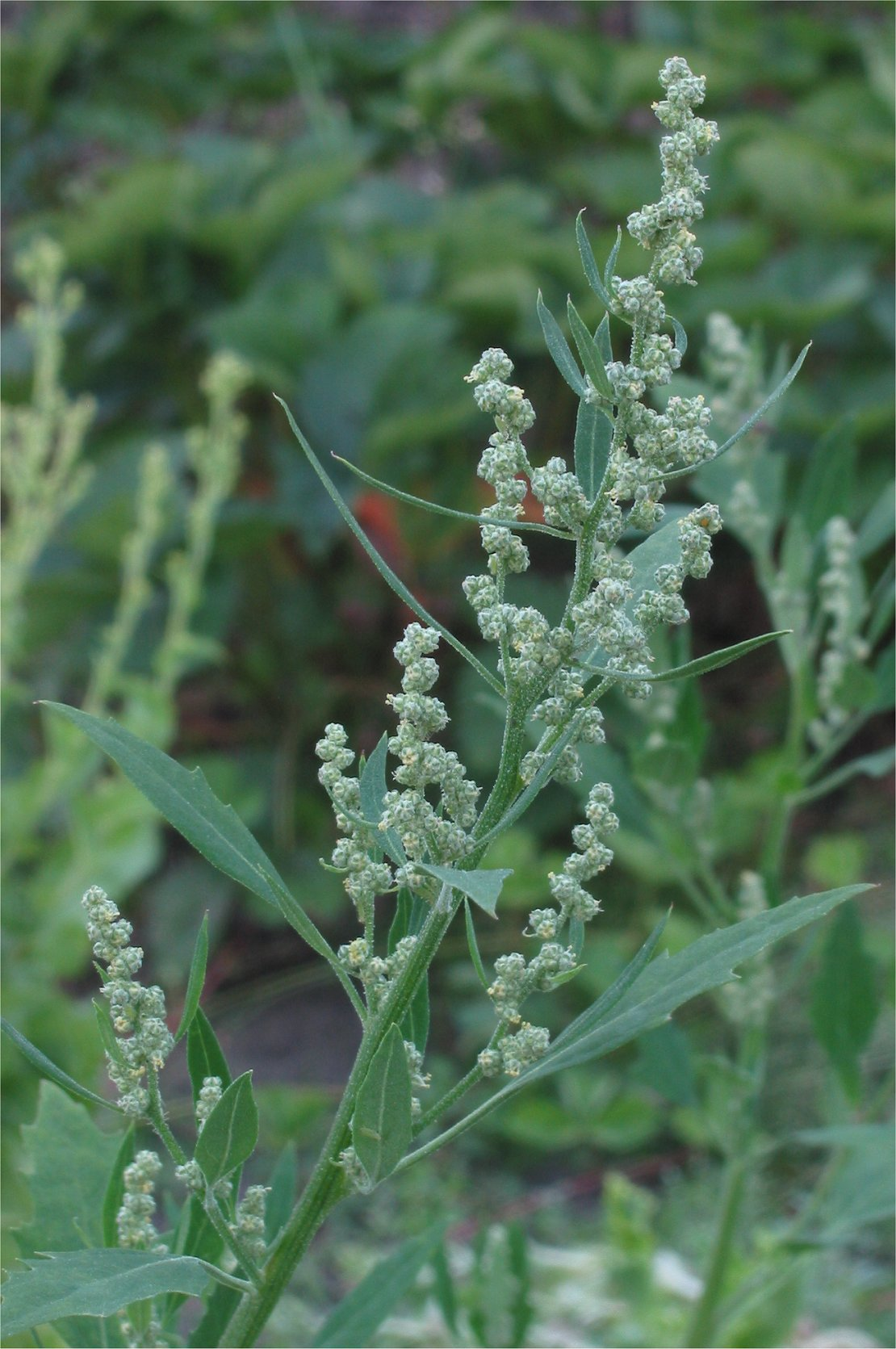
Chenopodium album

The earlier Cronquist system (1981) recognised the order as having 12 distinct families:

- family Achatocarpaceae
- family Aizoaceae
- family Amaranthaceae
- family Basellaceae
- family Cactaceae
- family Caryophyllaceae
- family Chenopodiaceae
- family Didiereaceae
- family Nyctaginaceae
- family Phytolaccaceae
- family Portulacaceae
- family Molluginaceae

The difference recognized by APG lies, in the first, with the concept of an "order"; APG favours larger orders and families, comparing the order Caryophyllales sensu APG to the subclass Caryophyllidae sensu Cronquist.

Secondly, divergence arises in which families are recognized as families; with plants in the Stegnospermataceae and Barbeuiaceae included in Cronquist's Phytolaccaceae. The Chenopodiaceae (still recognized by Cronquist) are included in Amaranthaceae by APG.

New to the order (sensu APG) are the Asteropeiaceae and Physenaceae, each containing a single genus, and two genera from Cronquist's order Nepenthales.

=== Earlier circumscriptions ===
Earlier systems - such as the Wettstein (1935), and Engler (1964) systems, classified a similar order under the name Centrospermae.
