= Family (taxonomy) =

Taxonomic rank between genus and order

The hierarchy of biological classification's eight major taxonomic ranks. Intermediate minor rankings are not shown.

Family (Latin: familia, pl.: familiae) is one of the eight major hierarchical taxonomic ranks in Linnaean taxonomy. It is classified between order and genus. A family may be divided into subfamilies, which are intermediate ranks between the ranks of family and genus. The official family names are Latin in origin; however, popular names are often used: for example, walnut trees and hickory trees belong to the family Juglandaceae, but that family is commonly referred to as the "walnut family".

The delineation of what constitutes a family—or whether a described family should be acknowledged—is established and decided upon by active taxonomists. There are not strict regulations for outlining or acknowledging a family, yet in the realm of plants, these classifications often rely on both the vegetative and reproductive characteristics of plant species. Taxonomists frequently hold varying perspectives on these descriptions, leading to a lack of widespread consensus within the scientific community for extended periods.

== Nomenclature ==
The naming of families is codified by various international bodies using the following suffixes:

- In fungal, algal, and botanical nomenclature, the family names of plants, fungi, and algae end with the suffix "-aceae", except for a small number of historic but widely used names including Compositae (also known as Asteraceae) and Gramineae (also known as Poaceae).
- In zoological nomenclature, the family names of animals end with the suffix "-idae".

Name changes at the family level are regulated by the codes of nomenclature. For botanical families, some traditional names like Palmae (Arecaceae), Cruciferae (Brassicaceae), and Leguminosae (Fabaceae) are conserved alongside their standardized -aceae forms due to their historical significance and widespread use in the literature. Family names are typically formed from the stem of a type genus within the family. In zoology, when a valid family name is based on a genus that is later found to be a junior synonym, the family name may be maintained for stability if it was established before 1960. In botany, some family names that were found to be junior synonyms have been conserved due to their widespread use in the scientific literature.

The family-group in zoological nomenclature includes several ranks: superfamily (-oidea), family (-idae), subfamily (-inae), and tribe (-ini). Under the principle of coordination, a name established at any of these ranks can be moved to another rank while retaining its original authorship and date, requiring only a change in suffix to reflect its new rank.

New family descriptions are relatively rare in taxonomy, occurring in fewer than one in a hundred taxonomic publications. Such descriptions typically result from either the discovery of organisms with unique combinations of characters that do not fit existing families, or from phylogenetic analyses that reveal the need for reclassification.

== History ==
The taxonomic term familia was first used by French botanist Pierre Magnol in his Prodromus historiae generalis plantarum, in quo familiae plantarum per tabulas disponuntur (1689) where he called the seventy-six groups of plants he recognised in his tables families (familiae). The concept of rank at that time was not yet belong to their family species settled, and in the preface to the Prodromus Magnol spoke of uniting his families into larger genera, which is far from how the term is used today.

In his work Philosophia Botanica published in 1751, Carl Linnaeus employed the term familia to categorize significant plant groups such as trees, herbs, ferns, palms, and so on. Notably, he restricted the use of this term solely within the book's morphological section, where he delved into discussions regarding the vegetative and generative aspects of plants. Subsequently, in French botanical publications, from Michel Adanson's Familles naturelles des plantes (1763) and until the end of the 19th century, the word famille was used as a French equivalent of the Latin ordo (or ordo naturalis).

The family concept in botany was further developed by the French botanists Antoine Laurent de Jussieu and Michel Adanson. Jussieu's 1789 Genera Plantarum divided plants into 100 'natural orders,' many of which correspond to modern plant families. However, the term 'family' did not become standardized in botanical usage until after the mid-nineteenth century.

In zoology, the family as a rank intermediate between order and genus was introduced by Pierre André Latreille in his Précis des caractères génériques des insectes, disposés dans un ordre naturel (1796). He used families (some of them were not named) in some but not in all his orders of "insects" (which then included all arthropods).

The standardization of zoological family names began in the early nineteenth century. A significant development came in 1813 when William Kirby introduced the -idae suffix for animal family names, derived from the Greek 'eidos' meaning 'resemblance' or 'like'. The adoption of this naming convention helped establish families as an important taxonomic rank. By the mid-1800s, many of Linnaeus's broad genera were being elevated to family status to accommodate the rapidly growing number of newly discovered species.

In nineteenth-century works such as the Prodromus of Augustin Pyramus de Candolle and the Genera Plantarum of George Bentham and Joseph Dalton Hooker, this word ordo was used for what now is given the rank of family.

== Uses ==
Families serve as valuable units for evolutionary, paleontological, and genetic studies due to their relatively greater stability compared to lower taxonomic levels like genera and species. Families play a significant practical role in biological education and research. They provide an efficient framework for teaching taxonomy, as they group organisms with general similarities while remaining specific enough to be useful for identification purposes. For example, in botany, learning the characteristics of major plant families helps students identify related species across different geographic regions, since families often have worldwide distribution patterns. In many groups of organisms, families serve as the primary level for taxonomic identification keys, making them particularly valuable for field guides and systematic work as they often represent readily recognizable groups of related organisms with shared characteristics.

In ecological and biodiversity research, families frequently serve as the foundational level for identification in survey work and environmental studies. This is particularly useful because families often share life history traits or occupy similar ecological niches. Some families show strong correlations between their taxonomic grouping and ecological functions, though this relationship varies among different groups of organisms.

The stability of family names has practical importance for applied biological work, though this stability faces ongoing challenges from new scientific findings. Modern molecular studies and phylogenetic analyses continue to refine the understanding of family relationships, sometimes leading to reclassification. The impact of these changes varies among different groups of organisms – while some families remain well-defined and easily recognizable, others require revision as new evidence emerges about evolutionary relationships. This balance between maintaining nomenclatural stability and incorporating new scientific discoveries remains an active area of taxonomic practice.

== See also ==
- Systematics, the study of the diversity of living organisms
- Cladistics, the classification of organisms by their order of branching in an evolutionary tree
- Virus classification
- List of Anuran families
- List of Testudines families
- List of fish families
- List of families of spiders

== Bibliography ==
- Bullock AA (January 1958). "Indicis Nominum Familiarum Angiospermarum Prodromus". Taxon. 7 (1): 1–35. Bibcode:1958Taxon...7....1B. doi:10.2307/1216226. JSTOR 1216226.
- Bullock AA (August 1958). "Indicis Nominum Familiarum Angiospermarum Prodromus: Additamenta et Corrigenda I". Taxon. 7 (6): 158–163. doi:10.2307/1217503. JSTOR 1217503.
- ICN (2012). "International Code of Nomenclature for algae, fungi, and plants". Bratislava: International Association for Plant Taxonomy.
