= Descriptive botanical name =

Descriptive botanical names are scientific names of groups of plants that are irregular, not being derived systematically from the name of a type genus. They may describe some characteristics of the group in general or may be a name already in existence before regularised scientific nomenclature.

Descriptive names can occur above or at the rank of family. There is only a single descriptive below the rank of family (the subfamily Papilionoideae).

== Above the rank of family ==
Descriptive names above the rank of family are governed by Article 16 of the International Code of Nomenclature for algae, fungi, and plants (ICN), which rules that a name above the rank of family may either be ‘automatically typified’ (such as Magnoliophyta and Magnoliopsida from the type genus Magnolia) or be descriptive.

Descriptive names of this type may be used unchanged at different ranks (without modifying the suffix). These descriptive plant names are decreasing in importance, becoming less common than ‘automatically typified names’, but many are still in use, such as:

Plantae, Algae, Musci, Fungi, Embryophyta, Tracheophyta, Spermatophyta, Gymnospermae, Coniferae, Coniferales, Angiospermae, Monocotyledones, Dicotyledones, etc.

Many of these descriptive names have a very long history, often preceding Carl Linnaeus. Some are Classical Latin common nouns in the nominative plural, meaning for instance ‘the plants’, ‘the seaweeds’, ‘the mosses’. Like all names above the rank of family, these names follow the Latin grammatical rules of nouns in the plural, and are written with an initial capital letter.

== At the rank of family ==
Article 18.5 of the ICN allows a descriptive name, of long usage, for the following eight families. For each of these families there also exists a name based on the name of an included genus (an alternative name that is also allowed, here in parentheses):

- Compositae = "composites" (alternative name: Asteraceae, based on the genus Aster)
- Cruciferae = "cross-bearers" (alternative name: Brassicaceae, based on the genus Brassica)
- Gramineae = "grasses" (alternative name: Poaceae, based on the genus Poa)
- Guttiferae = "latex-carriers" (alternative name: Clusiaceae, based on the genus Clusia)
- Labiatae = "lipped ones" (alternative name: Lamiaceae, based on the genus Lamium)
- Leguminosae = "legumes" (alternative name: Fabaceae, based on the genus Faba, now considered a section of genus Vicia)
- Palmae = "palms" (alternative name: Arecaceae, based on the genus Areca)
- Umbelliferae = "parasol-bearers" (alternative name: Apiaceae, based on the genus Apium)

== Subfamily ==
Special provision has been made in Article 19.8 for the plant subfamily name Papilionoideae to be an alternative name of the subfamily Faboideae, because the family Papilionaceae had previously been conserved when many botanists considered it to be a separate family from Fabaceae (Leguminosae). This name is not based on any plant genus named Papilio (a butterfly), but is a descriptive name meaning that the plant has butterfly-like flowers.
