= Reveal system =

20th century system of plant classification

A 20th-century system of plant taxonomy, the Reveal system (see also the Thorne & Reveal system) of plant classification was drawn up by the American botanist James Reveal (1941–2015). The system was published online in 1997 in ten parts as lecture notes comparing the major systems in use at that time. Subsequently, Reveal became an author with the consensus Angiosperm Phylogeny Group (APG) on the APG II 2003 and APG III 2009 processes. Although this largely supplanted the earlier and competing systems, he collaborated with Robert Thorne on his system (2007), and subsequently continued to develop his own system.

== 1997 system ==
- division Magnoliophyta [= angiosperms]
  class Magnoliopsida
  subclass Magnoliidae
  class Piperopsida
  subclass Piperidae
  subclass Nymphaeidae
  subclass Nelumbonidae
  class Liliopsida [= monocots]
  subclass Triurididae
  subclass Aridae
  subclass Liliidae
  subclass Arecidae
  subclass Commelinidae
  subclass Zingiberidae
  class Ranunculopsida
  subclass Ranunculidae
  class Rosopsida
  subclass Caryophyllidae
  subclass Hamamelididae
  subclass Dilleniidae
  subclass Rosidae
  subclass Cornidae
  subclass Lamiidae
  subclass Asteridae

In more detail:

- division 6. Magnoliophyta
  class 1. Magnoliopsida
  subclass 1. Magnoliidae
  superorder 1. Magnolianae
  order 1. Winterales
  family 1. Winteraceae
  order 2. Canellales
  family 1. Canellaceae
  order 3. Illiciales
  family 1. Illiciaceae
  family 2. Schisandraceae
  order 4. Magnoliales
  family 1. Degeneriaceae
  family 2. Himantandraceae
  family 3. Magnoliaceae
  order 5. Eupomatiales
  family 1. Eupomatiaceae
  order 6. Annonales
  family 1. Annonaceae
  order 7. Myristicales
  family 1. Myristicaceae
  order 8. Austrobaileyales
  family 1. Austrobaileyaceae
  superorder 2. Lauranae
  order 1. Laurales
  family 1. Amborellaceae
  family 2. Trimeniaceae
  family 3. Monimiaceae
  family 4. Gomortegaceae
  family 5. Hernandiaceae
  family 6. Lauraceae
  order 2. Calycanthales
  family 1. Calycanthaceae
  family 2. Idiospermaceae (now part of Calycantaceae)
  order 3. Chloranthales
  family 1. Chloranthaceae
  class 2. Piperopsida
  subclass 1. Piperidae
  superorder 1. Piperanae
  order 1. Piperales
  family 1. Saururaceae
  family 2. Piperaceae
  superorder 2. Lactoridanae
  order 1. Lactoridales
  family 1. Lactoridaceae
  order 2. Aristolochiales
  family 1. Aristolochiaceae
  superorder 3. Rafflesianae
  order 1. Hydnorales
  family 1. Hydnoraceae
  order 2. Rafflesiales
  family 1. Apodanthaceae
  family 2. Mitrastemonaceae
  family 3. Rafflesiaceae
  family 4. Cytinaceae
  superorder 4. Balanophoranae
  order 1. Cynomoriales
  family 1. Cynomoriaceae
  order 2. Balanophorales
  family 1. Mystropetalaceae
  family 2. Dactylanthaceae
  family 3. Lophophytaceae
  family 4. Sarcophytaceae
  family 5. Scybaliaceae
  family 6. Heloseaceae
  family 7. Langsdorffiaceae
  family 8. Balanophoraceae
  subclass 2. Nymphaeidae
  superorder 1. Nymphaeanae
  order 1. Nymphaeales
  family 1. Nymphaeaceae
  family 2. Barclayaceae
  subclass 3. Nelumbonidae
  superorder 1. Nelumbonanae
  order 1. Nelumbonales
  family 1. Nelumbonaceae
  order 2. Hydropeltidales
  family 1. Hydropeltidaceae
  family 2. Cabombaceae
  superorder 2. Ceratophyllanae
  order 1. Ceratophyllales
  family 1. Ceratophyllaceae
  class 3. Liliopsida
  subclass 1. Alismatidae
  superorder 1. Butomanae
  order 1. Butomales
  family 1. Butomaceae
  superorder 2. Alismatanae
  order 1. Alismatales
  family 1. Limnocharitaceae
  family 2. Alismataceae
  order 2. Hydrocharitales
  family 1. Hydrocharitaceae
  order 3. Aponogetonales
  family 1. Aponogetonaceae
  order 4. Najadales
  family 1. Najadaceae
  order 5. Juncaginales
  family 1. Scheuchzeriaceae
  family 2. Juncaginaceae
  order 6. Potamogetonales
  family 1. Potamogetonaceae
  family 2. Ruppiaceae
  family 3. Zannichelliaceae
  family 4. Zosteraceae
  family 5. Posidoniaceae
  family 6. Cymodoceaceae
  subclass 2. Triurididae
  superorder 1. Triuridanae
  order 1. Triuridales
  family 1. Triuridaceae
  subclass 3. Aridae
  superorder 1. Acoranae
  order 1. Acorales
  family 1. Acoraceae
  superorder 2. Aranae
  order 1. Arales
  family 1. Araceae
  superorder 3. Cyclanthanae
  order 1. Cyclanthales
  family 1. Cyclanthaceae
  superorder 4. Pandananae
  order 1. Pandanales
  family 1. Pandanaceae
  subclass 4. Liliidae
  order 1. Lilianae
  order 1. Tofieldiales
  family 1. Tofieldiaceae
  order 2. Dioscoreales
  family 1. Trichopodaceae
  family 2. Stenomeridaceae
  family 3. Avetraceae
  family 4. Dioscoreaceae
  family 5. Stemonaceae
  family 6. Croomiaceae
  family 7. Pentastemonaceae
  family 8. Taccaceae
  order 3. Smilacales
  family 1. Ripogonaceae
  family 2. Smilacaceae
  family 3. Petermanniaceae
  order 4. Nartheciales
  family 1. Nartheciaceae
  order 5. Petrosaviales
  family 1. Petrosaviaceae
  order 6. Melanthiales
  family 1. Chionographidaceae
  family 2. Heloniadaceae
  family 3. Xerophyllaceae
  family 4. Melanthiaceae
  family 5. Japonoliriaceae
  family 6. Campynemataceae
  order 7. Trilliales
  family 1. Trilliaceae
  order 8. Alstroemeriales
  family 1. Alstroemeriaceae
  order 9. Colchicales
  family 1. Burchardiaceae
  family 2. Colchicaceae
  family 3. Tricyrtidaceae
  family 4. Uvulariaceae
  family 5. Scoliopaceae
  family 6. Calochortaceae
  order 10. Liliales
  family 1. Liliaceae
  family 2. Medeolaceae
  order 11. Hypoxidales
  family 1. Hypoxidaceae
  order 12. Orchidales
  family 1. Orchidaceae
  order 13. Tecophilaeales
  family 1. Lanariaceae
  family 2. Ixioliriaceae
  family 3. Walleriaceae
  family 4. Tecophilaeaceae
  family 5. Cyanastraceae
  family 6. Eriospermaceae
  order 14. Iridales
  family 1. Iridaceae
  order 15. Burmanniales
  family 1. Burmanniaceae
  family 2. Corsiaceae
  order 16. Amaryllidales
  family 1. Hyacinthaceae
  family 2. Themidaceae
  family 3. Alliaceae
  family 4. Hesperocallidaceae
  family 5. Amaryllidaceae
  order 17. Asparagales
  family 2. Convallariaceae
  family 3. Ophiopogonaceae
  family 4. Asparagaceae
  order 18. Asteliales
  family 1. Dracaenaceae
  family 2. Ruscaceae
  family 3. Nolinaceae
  family 4. Asteliaceae
  family 6. Geitonoplesiaceae
  family 7. Luzuriagaceae
  family 8. Philesiaceae
  order 19. Hanguanales
  family 1. Hanguanaceae
  order 20. Agavales
  family 1. Dasypogonaceae
  family 2. Calectasiaceae
  family 3. Hemerocallidaceae
  family 4. Blandfordiaceae
  family 5. Xanthorrhoeaceae
  family 6. Agavaceae
  family 7. Anthericaceae
  family 8. Laxmanniaceae
  family 9. Herreriaceae
  family 10. Phormiaceae
  family 11. Johnsoniaceae
  family 12. Doryanthaceae
  family 13. Asphodelaceae
  family 14. Aloaceae
  family 15. Aphyllanthaceae
  family 16. Hostaceae
  subclass 5. Arecidae
  superorder 1. Arecanae
  order 1. Arecales
  family 1. Arecaceae
  subclass 6. Commelinidae
  superorder 1. Bromelianae
  order 1. Bromeliales
  family 1. Bromeliaceae
  order 2. Velloziales
  family 1. Velloziaceae
  superorder 2. Pontederianae
  order 1. Haemodorales
  family 1. Haemodoraceae
  order 2. Philydrales
  family 1. Philydraceae
  order 3. Pontederiales
  family 1. Pontederiaceae
  superorder 3. Commelinanae
  order 1. Xyridales
  family 1. Rapateaceae
  family 2. Xyridaceae
  family 3. Mayacaceae
  order 2. Commelinales
  family 1. Commelinaceae
  order 3. Eriocaulales
  family 1. Eriocaulaceae
  superorder 4. Hydatellanae
  order 1. Hydatellales
  family 1. Hydatellaceae
  superorder 5. Typhanae
  order 1. Typhales
  family 1. Typhaceae
  family 2. Sparganiaceae
  superorder 6. Juncanae
  order 1. Juncales
  family 1. Juncaceae
  family 2. Thurniaceae
  order 2. Cyperales
  family 1. Cyperaceae
  order 3. Flagellariales
  order 4. Restionales
  family 1. Flagellariaceae
  family 2. Joinvilleaceae
  family 3. Restionaceae
  family 4. Anarthriaceae
  family 5. Ecdeiocoleaceae
  family 6. Centrolepidaceae
  order 5. Poales
  family 1. Poaceae
  subclass 7. Zingiberidae
  superorder 1. Zingiberanae
  order 1. Zingiberales
  family 1. Strelitziaceae
  family 2. Heliconiaceae
  family 3. Musaceae
  family 4. Lowiaceae
  family 5. Zingiberaceae
  family 6. Costaceae
  family 7. Cannaceae
  family 8. Marantaceae
  class 4. Ranunculopsida
  subclass 1. Ranunculidae
  superorder 1. Ranunculanae
  order 1. Lardizabalales
  family 1. Lardizabalaceae
  family 2. Sargentodoxaceae
  family 3. Decaisneaceae
  order 2. Menispermales
  family 1. Menispermaceae
  order 3. Berberidales
  family 1. Nandinaceae
  family 2. Berberidaceae
  family 3. Ranzaniaceae
  family 4. Podophyllaceae
  family 5. Leonticaceae
  order 4. Ranunculales
  family 1. Hydrastidaceae
  family 2. Ranunculaceae
  order 5. Circaeasterales
  family 1. Kingdoniaceae
  family 2. Circaeasteraceae
  order 6. Glaucidiales
  family 1. Glaucidiaceae
  order 7. Paeoniales
  family 1. Paeoniaceae
  order 8. Papaverales
  family 1. Pteridophyllaceae
  family 2. Papaveraceae
  class 5. Rosopsida
  subclass 1. Caryophyllidae
  superorder 1. Caryophyllanae
  order 1. Caryophyllales
  family 1. Achatocarpaceae
  family 2. Portulacaceae
  family 3. Hectorellaceae
  family 4. Basellaceae
  family 5. Didiereaceae
  family 6. Cactaceae
  family 7. Stegnospermataceae
  family 8. Phytolaccaceae
  family 9. Petiveriaceae
  family 10. Gisekiaceae
  family 11. Agdestidaceae
  family 12. Barbeuiaceae
  family 13. Nyctaginaceae
  family 14. Sarcobataceae
  family 15. Aizoaceae
  family 16. Sesuviaceae
  family 17. Tetragoniaceae
  family 18. Halophytaceae
  family 19. Molluginaceae
  family 20. Chenopodiaceae
  family 21. Amaranthaceae
  family 22. Caryophyllaceae
  superorder 2. Polygonanae
  order 1. Polygonales
  family 1. Polygonaceae
  superorder 3. Plumbaginanae
  order 1. Plumbaginales
  family 1. Plumbaginaceae
  subclass 2. Hamamelididae
  superorder 1. Trochodendranae
  order 1. Trochodendrales
  family 1. Trochodendraceae
  family 2. Tetracentraceae
  order 2. Eupteleales
  family 1. Eupteleaceae
  order 3. Cercidiphyllales
  family 1. Cercidiphyllaceae
  superorder 2. Myrothamnanae
  order 1. Myrothamnales
  family 1. Myrothamnaceae
  superorder 3. Hamamelidanae
  order 1. Hamamelidales
  family 1. Hamamelidaceae
  family 2. Altingiaceae
  family 3. Platanaceae
  superorder 4. Casuarinanae
  order 1. Casuarinales
  family 1. Casuarinaceae
  superorder 5. Daphniphyllanae
  order 1. Barbeyales
  family 1. Barbeyaceae
  order 2. Daphniphyllales
  family 1. Daphniphyllaceae
  order 3. Balanopales
  family 1. Balanopaceae
  order 4. Didymelales
  family 1. Didymelaceae
  order 5. Buxales
  family 1. Buxaceae
  order 6. Simmondsiales
  family 1. Simmondsiaceae
  superorder 6. Juglandanae
  order 1. Fagales
  family 1. Nothofagaceae
  family 2. Fagaceae
  order 2. Corylales
  family 1. Betulaceae
  family 2. Corylaceae
  family 2. Stylocerataceae
  family 3. Ticodendraceae
  order 3. Myricales
  family 1. Myricaceae
  order 4. Rhoipteleales
  family 1. Rhoipteleaceae
  order 5. Juglandales
  family 1. Juglandaceae
  subclass 3. Dilleniidae
  superorder 1. Dillenianae
  order 1. Dilleniales
  family 1. Dilleniaceae
  superorder 2. Theanae
  order 1. Paracryphiales
  family 1. Paracryphiaceae
  order 2. Theales
  family 1. Stachyuraceae
  family 2. Theaceae
  family 3. Asteropeiaceae
  family 4. Pentaphylacaceae
  family 5. Tetrameristaceae
  family 6. Oncothecaceae
  family 7. Marcgraviaceae
  family 8. Caryocaraceae
  family 9. Pellicieraceae
  family 10. Clusiaceae
  order 3. Physenales
  family 1. Physenaceae
  order 4. Ochnales
  family 1. Medusagynaceae
  family 2. Strasburgeriaceae
  family 3. Scytopetalaceae
  family 4. Ochnaceae
  family 5. Quiinaceae
  order 5. Elatinales
  family 1. Elatinaceae
  order 6. Ancistrocladales
  family 1. Ancistrocladaceae
  order 7. Dioncophyllales
  family 1. Dioncophyllaceae
  superorder 3. Lecythidanae
  order 1. Lecythidales
  family 1. Lecythidaceae
  family 2. Asteranthaceae
  family 3. Napoleonaeaceae
  family 4. Foetidiaceae
  superorder 4. Sarracenianae
  order 1. Sarraceniales
  family 1. Sarraceniaceae
  superorder 5. Nepenthanae
  order 1. Nepenthales
  family 1. Nepenthaceae
  order 2. Droserales
  family 1. Droseraceae
  superorder 6. Ericanae
  order 1. Actinidiales
  family 1. Actinidiaceae
  order 2. Ericales
  family 1. Cyrillaceae
  family 2. Clethraceae
  family 3. Ericaceae
  order 3. Diapensiales
  family 1. Diapensiaceae
  order 4. Bruniales
  family 1. Bruniaceae
  family 2. Grubbiaceae
  order 5. Geissolomatales
  family 1. Geissolomataceae
  order 6. Fouquieriales
  family 1. Fouquieriaceae
  superorder 7. Primulanae
  order 1. Styracales
  family 1. Styracaceae
  family 2. Symplocaceae
  family 3. Ebenaceae
  family 4. Lissocarpaceae
  family 5. Sapotaceae
  order 2. Primulales
  family 1. Theophrastaceae
  family 2. Myrsinaceae
  family 3. Primulaceae
  superorder 8. Violanae
  order 1. Violales
  family 1. Berberidopsidaceae
  family 2. Aphloiaceae
  family 3. Bembiciaceae
  family 4. Flacourtiaceae
  family 5. Lacistemataceae
  family 6. Peridiscaceae
  family 7. Violaceae
  family 8. Dipentodontaceae
  family 9. Scyphostegiaceae
  order 2. Passiflorales
  family 1. Passifloraceae
  family 2. Turneriaceae
  family 3. Malesherbiaceae
  family 4. Achariaceae
  order 3. Caricales
  family 1. Caricaceae
  order 4. Salicales
  family 1. Salicaceae
  order 5. Elaeocarpales
  family 1. Elaeocarpaceae
  order 6. Tamaricales
  family 1. Tamaricaceae
  family 2. Frankeniaceae
  superorder 9. Capparanae
  order 1. Moringales
  family 1. Moringaceae
  order 2. Gyrostemonales
  family 1. Gyrostemonaceae
  order 3. Batales
  family 1. Bataceae
  order 4. Capparales
  family 1. Koeberliniaceae
  family 2. Pentadiplandraceae
  family 3. Capparaceae
  family 4. Brassicaceae
  family 5. Tovariaceae
  family 6. Resedaceae
  superorder 10. Malvanae
  order 1. Cistales
  family 1. Bixaceae
  family 2. Cochlospermaceae
  family 3. Cistaceae
  family 4. Diegodendraceae
  order 2. Malvales
  family 1. Tiliaceae
  family 2. Dirachmaceae
  family 3. Monotaceae
  family 4. Dipterocarpaceae
  family 5. Sarcolaenaceae
  family 6. Plagiopteraceae
  family 7. Huaceae
  family 8. Sterculiaceae
  family 9. Sphaerosepalaceae
  family 10. Bombacaceae
  family 11. Malvaceae
  order 3. Thymelaeales
  family 1. Gonystylaceae
  family 2. Thymelaeaceae
  superorder 11. Cucurbitanae
  order 1. Begoniales
  family 1. Datiscaceae
  family 2. Begoniaceae
  order 2. Cucurbitales
  family 1. Cucurbitaceae
  superorder 12. Urticanae
  order 1. Urticales
  family 1. Ulmaceae
  family 2. Celtidaceae
  family 3. Moraceae
  family 4. Cecropiaceae
  family 5. Urticaceae
  family 6. Cannabaceae
  superorder 13. Euphorbianae
  order 1. Euphorbiales
  family 1. Euphorbiaceae
  family 2. Pandaceae
  family 3. Dichapetalaceae
  subclass 4. Rosidae
  superorder 1. Saxifraganae
  order 1. Cunoniales
  family 1. Cunoniaceae
  family 2. Davidsoniaceae
  family 3. Eucryphiaceae
  family 4. Brunelliaceae
  order 2. Cephalotales
  family 1. Cephalotaceae
  order 3. Greyiales
  family 1. Greyiaceae
  order 4. Francoales
  family 1. Francoaceae
  order 5. Crossosomatales
  family 1. Crossosomataceae
  order 6. Saxifragales
  family 1. Tetracarpaeaceae
  family 2. Penthoraceae
  family 3. Crassulaceae
  family 4. Grossulariaceae
  family 5. Pterostemonaceae
  family 6. Iteaceae
  family 7. Saxifragaceae
  superorder 2. Podostemanae
  order 1. Gunnerales
  family 1. Gunneraceae
  order 2. Haloragales
  family 1. Haloragaceae
  order 3. Podostemales
  family 1. Podostemaceae
  superorder 3. Celastranae
  order 1. Brexiales
  family 1. Brexiaceae
  order 2. Parnassiales
  family 1. Parnassiaceae
  family 2. Lepuropetalaceae
  order 3. Celastrales
  family 1. Celastraceae
  family 2. Goupiaceae
  family 3. Lophopyxidaceae
  family 4. Stackhousiaceae
  order 4. Salvadorales
  family 1. Salvadoraceae
  order 5. Aquifoliales
  family 1. Aquifoliaceae
  family 2. Phellinaceae
  family 3. Sphenostemonaceae
  family 4. Icacinaceae
  family 5. Cardiopteridaceae
  family 6. Aextoxicaceae
  order 6. Corynocarpales
  family 1. Corynocarpaceae
  superorder 4. Santalanae
  order 1. Medusandrales
  family 1. Medusandraceae
  order 2. Santalales
  family 1. Olacaceae
  family 2. Opiliaceae
  family 3. Santalaceae
  family 4. Misodendraceae
  family 5. Loranthaceae
  family 6. Eremolepidaceae
  family 7. Viscaceae
  superorder 5. Rosanae
  order 1. Rosales
  family 1. Rosaceae
  family 2. Neuradaceae
  family 3. Chrysobalanaceae
  superorder 6. Geranianae
  order 1. Geraniales
  family 1. Oxalidaceae
  family 2. Geraniaceae
  order 2. Linales
  family 1. Hugoniaceae
  family 2. Linaceae
  family 3. Ctenolophonaceae
  family 4. Ixonanthaceae
  family 5. Humiriaceae
  family 6. Erythroxylaceae
  family 7. Zygophyllaceae
  order 3. Balsaminales
  family 1. Balsaminaceae
  order 4. Vochysiales
  family 1. Malpighiaceae
  family 2. Trigoniaceae
  family 3. Vochysiaceae
  family 4. Tremandraceae
  family 5. Krameriaceae
  order 5. Polygalales
  family 1. Polygalaceae
  family 2. Xanthophyllaceae
  family 3. Emblingiaceae
  superorder 7. Fabanae
  order 1. Fabales
  family 1. Mimosaceae
  family 2. Caesalpiniaceae
  family 3. Fabaceae
  superorder 8. Rutanae
  order 1. Sapindales
  family 1. Staphyleaceae
  family 2. Tapisciaceae
  family 3. Melianthaceae
  family 4. Sapindaceae
  family 5. Hippocastanaceae
  family 6. Aceraceae
  family 7. Bretschneideraceae
  family 8. Akaniaceae
  order 2. Tropaeolales
  family 1. Tropaeolaceae
  order 3. Limnanthales
  family 1. Limnanthaceae
  order 4. Sabiales
  family 1. Sabiaceae
  order 5. Connarales
  family 1. Connaraceae
  order 6. Rutales
  family 1. Rutaceae
  family 2. Rhabdodendraceae
  family 3. Cneoraceae
  family 4. Simaroubaceae
  family 5. Picramniaceae
  family 6. Leitneriaceae
  family 7. Surianaceae
  family 8. Irvingiaceae
  family 9. Kirkiaceae
  family 10. Ptaeroxylaceae
  family 11. Tepuianthaceae
  family 12. Meliaceae
  family 13. Lepidobotryaceae
  order 7. Coriariales
  family 1. Coriariaceae
  order 8. Burserales
  family 1. Burseraceae
  family 2. Anacardiaceae
  family 3. Podoaceae
  superorder 9. Rhamnanae
  order 1. Rhamnales
  family 1. Rhamnaceae
  order 2. Elaeagnales
  family 1. Elaeagnaceae
  superorder 10. Proteanae
  order 1. Proteales
  family 1. Proteaceae
  superorder 11. Vitanae
  order 1. Vitales
  family 1. Vitaceae
  family 2. Leeaceae
  superorder 12. Rhizophoranae
  order 1. Rhizophorales
  family 1. Anisophylleaceae
  family 2. Rhizophoraceae
  superorder 13. Myrtanae
  order 1. Myrtales
  family 1. Combretaceae
  family 2. Crypteroniaceae
  family 3. Melastomataceae
  family 4. Psiloxylaceae
  family 5. Heteropyxidaceae
  family 6. Myrtaceae
  family 7. Alzateaceae
  family 8. Rhynchocalycaceae
  family 9. Penaeaceae
  family 10. Oliniaceae
  family 11. Lythraceae
  family 12. Trapaceae
  family 13. Onagraceae
  subclass. 5 Cornidae
  superorder 1. Cornanae
  order 1. Hydrangeales
  family 1. Escalloniaceae
  family 2. Hydrangeaceae
  family 3. Abrophyllaceae
  family 4. Argophyllaceae
  family 5. Corokiaceae
  family 6. Alseuosmiaceae
  family 7. Carpodetaceae
  family 8. Phyllonomaceae
  family 9. Pottingeriaceae
  family 10. Tribelaceae
  family 11. Melanophyllaceae
  family 12. Montiniaceae
  family 13. Kaliphoraceae
  family 14. Eremosynaceae
  family 15. Vahliaceae
  family 16. Columelliaceae
  order 2. Roridulales
  family 1. Roridulaceae
  order 3. Garryales
  family 1. Aucubaceae
  family 2. Garryaceae
  order 4. Desfontainiales
  family 1. Desfontainiaceae
  order 5. Aralidiales
  family 1. Aralidiaceae
  order 6. Cornales
  family 1. Mastixiaceae
  family 2. Davidiaceae
  family 3. Nyssaceae
  family 4. Curtisiaceae
  family 5. Cornaceae
  family 6. Alangiaceae
  family 7. Griseliniaceae
  superorder 2. Eucommianae
  order 1. Eucommiales
  family 1. Eucommiaceae
  superorder 3. Aralianae
  order 1. Torricelliales
  family 1. Helwingiaceae
  family 2. Torricelliaceae
  order 2. Pittosporales
  family 1. Pittosporaceae
  order 3. Byblidales
  family 1. Byblidaceae
  order 4. Araliales
  family 1. Araliaceae
  family 2. Hydrocotylaceae
  family 3. Apiaceae
  superorder 4. Dipsacanae
  order 1. Dipsacales
  family 1. Viburnaceae
  family 2. Sambucaceae
  family 3. Adoxaceae
  family 4. Caprifoliaceae
  family 5. Valerianaceae
  family 6. Dipsacaceae
  family 7. Morinaceae
  subclass 6. Lamiidae
  superorder 1. Gentiananae
  order 1. Gentianales
  family 1. Gelsemiaceae
  family 2. Loganiaceae
  family 3. Strychnaceae
  family 4. Gentianaceae
  family 5. Saccifoliaceae
  family 6. Geniostomaceae
  family 7. Plocospermataceae
  order 2. Rubiales
  family 1. Dialypetalanthaceae
  family 2. Rubiaceae
  family 3. Carlemanniaceae
  order 3. Apocynales
  family 1. Apocynaceae
  superorder 2. Solananae
  order 1. Solanales
  family 1. Solanaceae
  family 2. Sclerophylacaceae
  family 3. Goetzeaceae
  family 4. Duckeodendraceae
  family 5. Convolvulaceae
  family 6. Cuscutaceae
  family 7. Polemoniaceae
  family 8. Hydrophyllaceae
  family 9. Boraginaceae
  family 10. Tetrachondraceae
  family 11. Hoplestigmataceae
  family 12. Lennoaceae
  superorder 3. Loasanae
  order 1. Loasales
  family 1. Loasaceae
  superorder 4. Oleanae
  order 1. Oleales
  family 1. Oleaceae
  superorder 5. Lamianae
  order 1. Lamiales
  family 1. Buddlejaceae
  family 2. Stilbaceae
  family 3. Bignoniaceae
  family 4. Paulowniaceae
  family 5. Schlegeliaceae
  family 6. Globulariaceae
  family 7. Scrophulariaceae
  family 8. Veronicaceae
  family 9. Orobanchaceae
  family 10. Oftiaceae
  family 11. Myoporaceae
  family 12. Callitrichaceae
  family 13. Gesneriaceae
  family 14. Plantaginaceae
  family 15. Pedaliaceae
  family 16. Martyniaceae
  family 17. Trapellaceae
  family 18. Acanthaceae
  family 19. Lentibulariaceae
  family 20. Verbenaceae
  family 21. Phrymaceae
  family 22. Cyclocheilaceae
  family 23. Avicenniaceae
  family 24. Lamiaceae
  order 2. Hydrostachyales
  family 1. Hydrostachyaceae
  order 3. Hippuridales
  family 1. Hippuridaceae
  subclass 7. Asteridae
  superorder Campanulanae
  order 1. Menyanthales
  family 1. Menyanthaceae
  order 2. Goodeniales
  family 1. Goodeniaceae
  order 3. Stylidiales
  family 1. Donatiaceae
  family 2. Stylidiaceae
  order 4. Campanulales
  family 1. Pentaphragmataceae
  family 2. Sphenocleaceae
  family 3. Campanulaceae
  superorder 2. Asteranae
  order 1. Calycerales
  family 1. Calyceraceae
  order 2. Asterales
  family 1. Asteraceae

== Bibliography ==
- Chase, Mark W; Reveal, James L (2009). "A phylogenetic classification of the land plants to accompany APG III" (PDF). Botanical Journal of the Linnean Society. 161 (2): 122–127. doi:10.1111/j.1095-8339.2009.01002.x.
- Reveal, J.L. (2 April 2012). "An outline of a classification scheme for extant flowering plants" (PDF). Phytoneuron (37): 1–221.
- Reveal, James L. (30 April 2011). "Summary of recent systems of angiosperm classification". Kew Bulletin. 66 (1): 5–48. Bibcode:2011KewBu..66....5R. doi:10.1007/s12225-011-9259-y. S2CID 44982192.
- Thorne, Robert F.; Reveal, James L. (April 2007). "An Updated Classification of the Class Magnoliopsida ("Angiospermae")". The Botanical Review. 73 (2): 67–181. doi:10.1663/0006-8101(2007)73[67:AUCOTC]2.0.CO;2. S2CID 24415895.
- Reveal, James L (5 Nov 1997). "Reveal System of Classification" (pbio 250 Lecture Notes). Plant Systematics. University of Maryland: Norton-Brown Herbarium.
- Reveal, James L (22 Nov 1998). "Vascular Plant Family Nomenclature: Lists of the Flowering Plant Taxa Accepted by Cronquist, Dahlgren, Reveal, Takhtajan & Thorne". Plant Systematics. University of Maryland: Norton-Brown Herbarium.
- Angiosperm Phylogeny Group II (2003), "An update of the Angiosperm Phylogeny Group classification for the orders and families of flowering plants: APG II", Botanical Journal of the Linnean Society, 141 (4): 399–436, doi:10.1046/j.1095-8339.2003.t01-1-00158.x
- Angiosperm Phylogeny Group III (2009), "An update of the Angiosperm Phylogeny Group classification for the orders and families of flowering plants: APG III", Botanical Journal of the Linnean Society, 161 (2): 105–121, doi:10.1111/j.1095-8339.2009.00996.x, hdl:10654/18083
