= Ptaeroxylaceae =

Family of trees

Ptaeroxylaceae Juss. are a small family of Southern African indigenous trees and woody lianes, most of them from Madagascar, comprising only two genera. Such a family was not recognized by the APG II system of classification (2003), which noted that it was a synonym of Rutaceae. The APG III system of 2009, an updated version of the last system, did not mention the family. All species within this family are included within Rutaceae.

The family Ptaeroxylaceae was recognized by the Thorne system (1992), Dahlgren system, and Reveal system and placed in the Rutales.

Genus: Cedrelopsis Baill.

Species:

- Cedrelopsis ambanjensis J.F. Leroy
- Cedrelopsis gracilis J.F. Leroy
- Cedrelopsis grevei Baill. & Courchet
- Cedrelopsis longibracteata J.F. Leroy
- Cedrelopsis microfoliolata J.F. Leroy
- Cedrelopsis procera J.F. Leroy
- Cedrelopsis rakotozafyi Cheek & M. Lescot
- Cedrelopsis trivalvis J.F. Leroy

Genus: Ptaeroxylon Ecklon & Zeyher, 1834

- Ptaeroxylon obliquum (Thunb.) Radlk. (Ptaeroxylon utile)
