= Rosopsida =

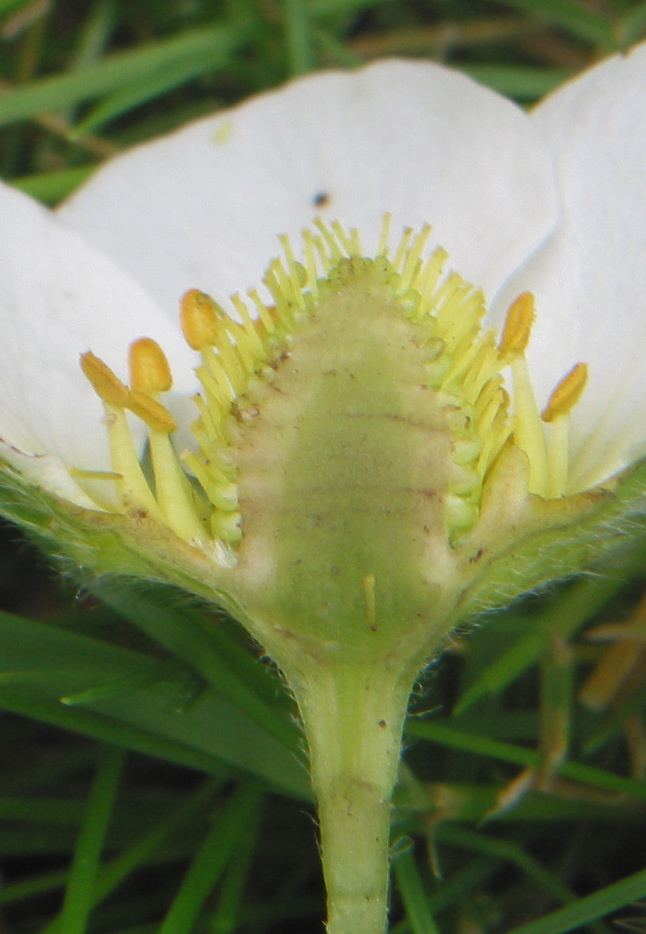
Rosopsida

Rosopsida (Batsch, 1788) is a botanical name for a group of flowering plants recognized at the rank of class. The name is derived from that of the included family Rosaceae. As used in the Reveal system it is a subset of the dicots, a paraphyletic group recognized at various ranks in other systems, and includes:

- subclass Caryophyllidae
- subclass Hamamelididae
- subclass Dilleniidae
- subclass Rosidae
- subclass Cornidae
- subclass Lamiidae
- subclass Asteridae

Reveal's use of the group corresponds largely to Cronquist's class Magnoliopsida (but minus subclass Magnoliidae) and to the eudicots of the APG II system minus Ranunculales and some other early-branching groups.

The name has not been used in most of the more influential recent classification systems, such as the Cronquist system, the Thorne system, the Takhtajan system or the APG II system.
