= Sympetalae =

Historical subclass of flowering plants with fused petals

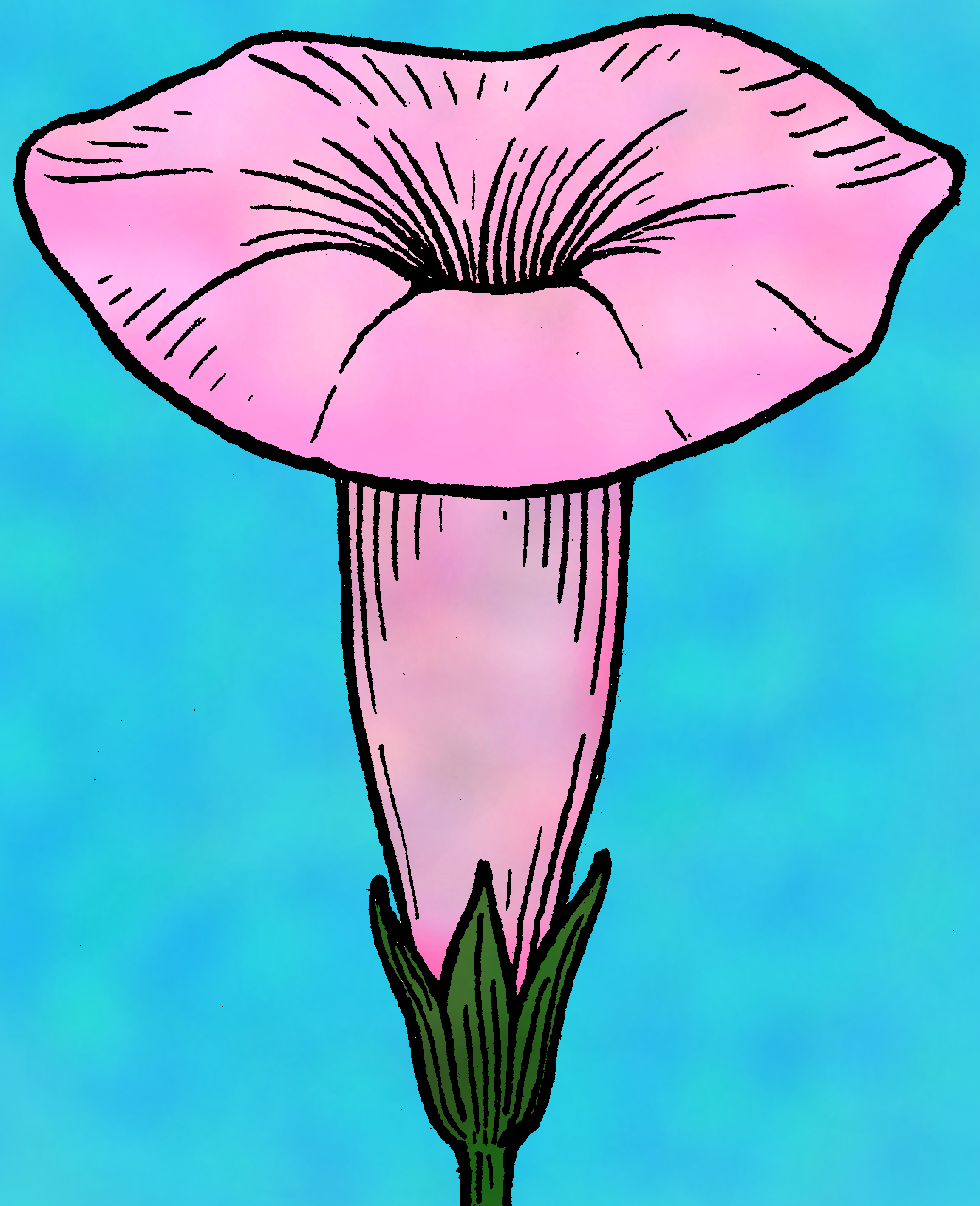
A flower showing sympetally (fused petals), a characteristic of the Sympetalae subclass

Sympetally (fused petals) is a flower characteristic that historically was used to classify a grouping of plants termed Sympetalae, but this term has been abandoned in newer molecular based classifications, although the grouping has similarity to the modern term asterids.

== History ==
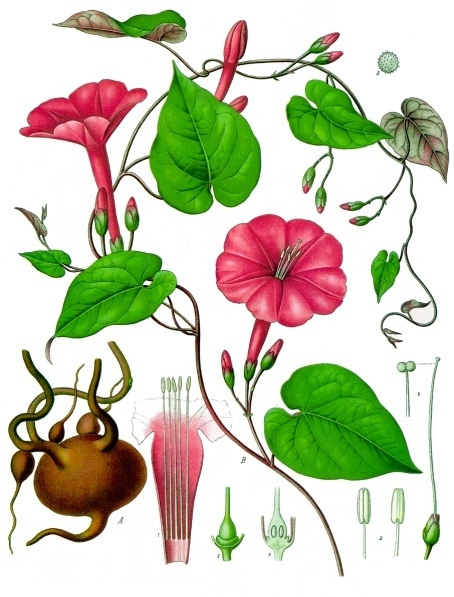
Ipomoea purga

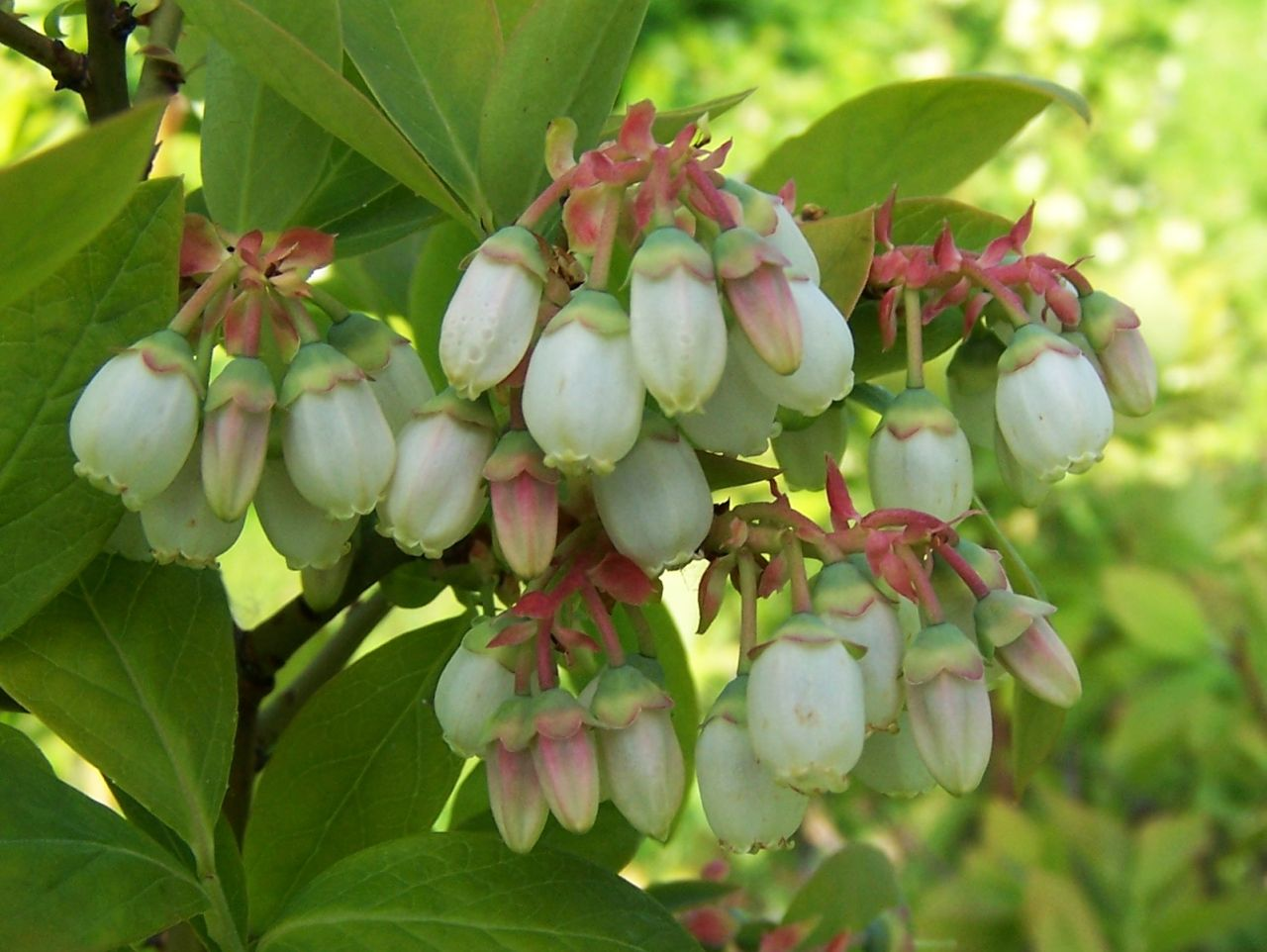
Vaccinium corymbosum

Sympetalae Rchb. (1828), meaning "with fused petals", is a descriptive botanical name used in the Eichler, Engler, and Wettstein systems for a group of flowering plants (angiosperms). In this group the flowers have a separate calyx and corolla and in which the corolla petals are fused, at least at their base, a condition known as sympetally.

Prior to the phylogenic classifications of August Eichler and his successors this group corresponds to the Gamopetalae of Bentham and Hooker, gamopetally being a synonym of sympetally. This was one of the three divisions of dicotyledons in their system. In Eichler's Blüthendiagramme, the class Dicotyleae was divided into two subclasses, the Sympetalae (also classified as Metachlamydeae) and the Choripetalae. Adolf Engler and Karl Prantl also listed Sympetalae as a division of the class Dicotyledoneae in their system, Die Natürlichen Pflanzenfamilien, with Sympetalae being composed of gamopetalous families having gamopetalous corollas. Alfred Rendle similarly described Sympetalae as originating from dicots, and then divided them into Pentacyclicae and Tetracyclicae in accordance with the number of flower parts in each group, four and five respectively.

According to Engler and Prantl, Sympetalae includes the following orders: Diapensiales, Ericales, Primulales, Plumbaginales, Ebenales, Contortae, Tubiflorae, Plantaginales, Rubiales, Cucurbitales, and Campanulatae.

Sympetalous flowers are found in many angiosperms, but it was the combination of sympetally with a "stamen whorl isomerous and alternate with the corolla-lobes, or stamens fewer than the corolla lobes" that Takhtajan (1964) used to define the subclass Asteridae, and later by Cronquist (1981), and later, corresponding to the asterids in the modern Angiosperm Phylogeny Group (APG) system, based on molecular phylogenetics. Since sympetally has arisen independently many times in evolution (homoplasy), on its own it is not useful for taxonomic classification.

== Examples ==
- Lady's bedstraw (Galium verum)
- Olive (Olea europaea)
- Northern highbush blueberry (Vaccinium corymbosum)
- Willow gentian (Gentiana asclepiadea)
- Lavender (Lavandula angustifolia)
- Jalap (Ipomoea purga)

== See also ==
- Asteridae
- Asterids

== Bibliography ==
- Sambamurty, A. V. S. S. (2005). Taxonomy of angiosperms. New Delhi: I.K. International. ISBN 81-88237-16-7.
- Erbar, Claudia (26 July 1991). "Sympetaly - A systematic character?". Bot. Jahrb. Syst. 112 (4): 417–451.
- Angiosperm Phylogeny Group IV (2016). "An update of the Angiosperm Phylogeny Group classification for the orders and families of flowering plants: APG IV". Botanical Journal of the Linnean Society. 181 (1): 1–20. doi:10.1111/boj.12385.
- Bihrmann. "History of Taxonomy, 1875-1926". Caudiciforms.
- Vuijk, Dick. "Taxonomical notes on the grouping of plants". Natural history of Iceland.
