= Melanophylla modestei =

Conservation status
- Endangered (IUCN 3.1)

Scientific classification
- Kingdom: Plantae
- Clade: Tracheophytes
- Clade: Angiosperms
- Clade: Eudicots
- Clade: Asterids
- Order: Apiales
- Family: Torricelliaceae
- Genus: Melanophylla
- Species: M. modestei

Binomial name
- Melanophylla modestei G.E.Schatz, Lowry & A.-E. Wolf

Species of flowering plant

Melanophylla modestei is a species of plant in the Torricelliaceae family. It is endemic to Madagascar. Its natural habitat is subtropical or tropical moist lowland forests. It is threatened by habitat loss.
