= Melanophylla alnifolia =

Conservation status
- Least Concern (IUCN 3.1)

Scientific classification
- Kingdom: Plantae
- Clade: Tracheophytes
- Clade: Angiosperms
- Clade: Eudicots
- Clade: Asterids
- Order: Apiales
- Family: Torricelliaceae
- Genus: Melanophylla
- Species: M. alnifolia

Binomial name
- Melanophylla alnifolia Baker

Species of flowering plant

Melanophylla alnifolia is a species of plant in the Torricelliaceae family. It is endemic to eastern Madagascar. Its natural habitat is tropical moist lowland and montane forests. It is threatened by habitat loss.

== Description ==
Melanophylla alnifolia is a large shrub or small tree, growing up to 10 meters tall. It flowers and fruits between November and May.

== Range and habitat ==
Melanophylla alnifolia is widespread in the humid and subhumid regions of eastern Madagascar, from Kalambatritra in the south to Makirovana Tsihomanaomby and Manongarivo Massif in the north, in the former provinces of Antananarivo, Antsiranana, Fianarantsoa, Toamasina, and Toliara. The species' estimated extent of occurrence (EOO) is 153,444 km^{2}, and the area of occupancy (AOO) is 140 km^{2}.

It inhabits humid lowland forests and mid-elevation montane forests between 341 and 1,710 meters elevation. It is also found in forest vestiges, lichen forest, river valleys, and on windswept ridges.

== Conservation and threats ==
The species is threatened with habitat loss from shifting cultivation, selective logging, and fires.

There are 24 subpopulations living in protected areas, including Ambohitantely, Anjanaharibe Sud, Anjozorobe Angavo, Betampona, Ankeniheny-Zahamena Corridor, Kalambatritra, Makira, Makirovana Tsihomanaomby, Manongarivo, Marojejy, Masoala, Ranomafana, and Zahamena.
