= A. pinnatifidum =

A. pinnatifidum may refer to:

- Aethephyllum pinnatifidum, a succulent plant of South Africa
- Aralidium pinnatifidum, a tree of southeast Asia
- Argyranthemum pinnatifidum, a flowering plant of Madeira
- Asplenium pinnatifidum, a fern of the eastern United States
- Athroisma pinnatifidum, a plant of Madagascar
