= Magnoliopsida =

Class of flowering plants

Magnoliopsida is a valid botanical name for a class of flowering plants. By definition the class will include the family Magnoliaceae, but its circumscription can otherwise vary, being more inclusive or less inclusive depending upon the classification system being discussed.

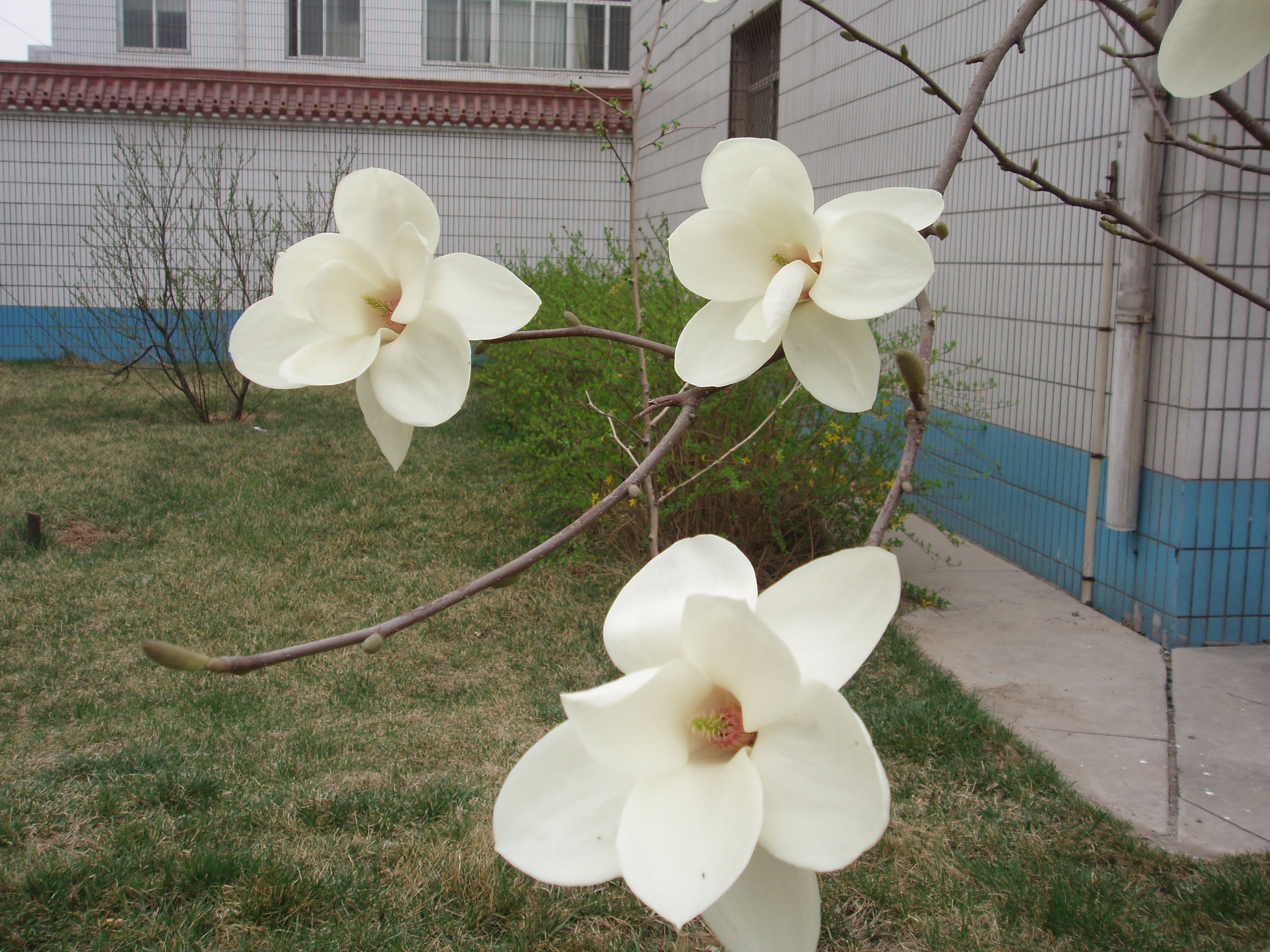
Magnolia flowers

== Classification ==
=== Cronquist and Takhtajan systems ===
In the Takhtajan system and the Cronquist system, the name was used for the group known as dicotyledons.

The Takhtajan system used this internal taxonomy:

- class Magnoliopsida (= dicotyledons)
  - subclass Magnoliidae
  - subclass Nymphaeidae
  - subclass Nelumbonidae
  - subclass Ranunculidae
  - subclass Caryophyllidae
  - subclass Hamamelididae
  - subclass Dilleniidae
  - subclass Rosidae
  - subclass Cornidae
  - subclass Asteridae
  - subclass Lamiidae

The Cronquist system used this internal taxonomy (in the 1981 version):

- class Magnoliopsida (= dicotyledons)
  - subclass Magnoliidae
  - subclass Hamamelidae
  - subclass Caryophyllidae
  - subclass Dilleniidae
  - subclass Rosidae
  - subclass Asteridae

The Cronquist system has been very popular, and there have been many versions of the system published. In some of these Cronquist-based systems the name Magnoliopsida (at the rank of class) refers to the flowering plants (angiosperms).

=== Dahlgren and Thorne systems ===
The Dahlgren system and the Thorne system (1992) used the name Magnoliopsida for the flowering plants.

- class Magnoliopsida (= angiosperms)
  - subclass Magnoliidae (= dicotyledons)
  - subclass Liliidae (= monocotyledons)

=== Reveal system ===
The Reveal system used the name Magnoliopsida for a group of the primitive dicotyledons, corresponding to about half of the plants in the magnoliids:

- class 1. Magnoliopsida
  - superorder 1. Magnolianae
  - superorder 2. Lauranae

=== APG systems ===
In the APG and APG II systems, botanical names are used only at the rank of order and below. Above the rank of order, these systems use their own names, such as angiosperms, eudicots, monocots, rosids, etc. These names refer to clades (unranked). The class Magnoliopsida is not defined. The idea that dicotyledons are a taxonomic unit and require a formal name is rejected by the APG: the dicots are considered to be paraphyletic.
