= Kalambatritra Special Reserve =

Wildlife reserve in Madagascar

- Kalambatrika Special Reserve
- IUCN category IV (habitat/species management area)
- Location within Madagascar
- Location: Southern Madagascar
- Coordinates: 23°22′S 46°30′E
- Area: 282.55 square kilometres (109.09 sq mi)
- Established: 1959
- Governing body: Parcs Nationaux Madagascar – ANGAP

Kalambatritra Special Reserve is a wildlife reserve in southern Madagascar. It is to the north of Andohahela National Park, south-west of the Manombo Special Reserve and contains many endemic species, including forty-five endemic bird species.

== Geography ==
This 28,255 hectares (69,820 acres) reserve is within the commune of Begogo, in Anosy Region and 55 kilometres (34 mi) east of Betroka. The Kalambatritra massif is a series of undulating hills and steep summits and is part of the Antaivondro-Kalambatritra mountain chain. The many small streams feed the Ionaivo, Mananara and Mandrare rivers.

The dominant ethnic group in the area is the Bara people.

== Flora and fauna ==
The humid, evergreen forest is relatively undisturbed and divided into blocks with savannahs of the coarse grass (Aristida imperata) in between. Among the 699 species of plants so far recorded on the reserve, two families are endemic; the Torricelliaceae, including Melanophylla alnifolia and the Sarcolaenaceae including Leptolaena pauciflora, which, according to the International Union for Conservation of Nature (IUCN) is an endangered species on the IUCN Red List.

Seventy-four species of birds are known from the reserve, of which forty-five are endemic. They are all listed as of least concern except Meller's duck (Anas melleri), which is listed as endangered and the wedge-tailed jery (Neomixis flavoviridis), Madagascar yellowbrow (Crossleyia xanthophrys), Grey-crowned Tetraka (Bernieria cinereiceps), Pollen's Vanga (Xenopirostris polleni) and Rufous-headed ground roller (Atelornis crossleyi) which are all listed as near threatened.

Lemurs found on the reserve are listed below.

List of lemur species found in Kalambatritra Reserve
| Viewing time | Species |
|---|---|
| Day | Ring-tailed lemur (Lemur catta); Southern lesser bamboo lemur (Hapalemur meridionalis); Collared brown lemur (Eulemur collaris) |
| Night | Wright's sportive lemur (Lepilemur wrightae); Aye-aye (Daubentonia madagascariensis) |

== Threats ==
Growing rice and cutting wood for construction and cooking are the main threats to the area.

== See also ==
- List of national parks of Madagascar
