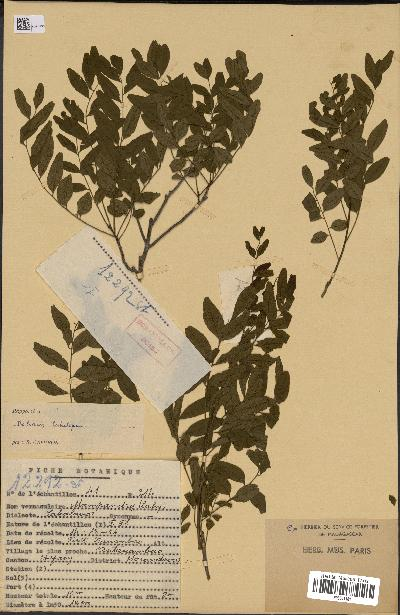
- dried specimen of Cedrelopsis gracilis

Scientific classification
- Kingdom: Plantae
- Clade: Tracheophytes
- Clade: Angiosperms
- Clade: Eudicots
- Clade: Rosids
- Order: Sapindales
- Family: Rutaceae
- Genus: Cedrelopsis
- Species: C. gracilis

Binomial name
- Cedrelopsis gracilis J.F.Leroy

= Cedrelopsis gracilis =

Species of flowering plant

Cedrelopsis gracilis, also called katafa tree or healers' tree, is a species of Cedrelopsis.

== Uses ==
Like katrafay, Cedrelopsis gracilis is considered to have a medicinal benefit.
