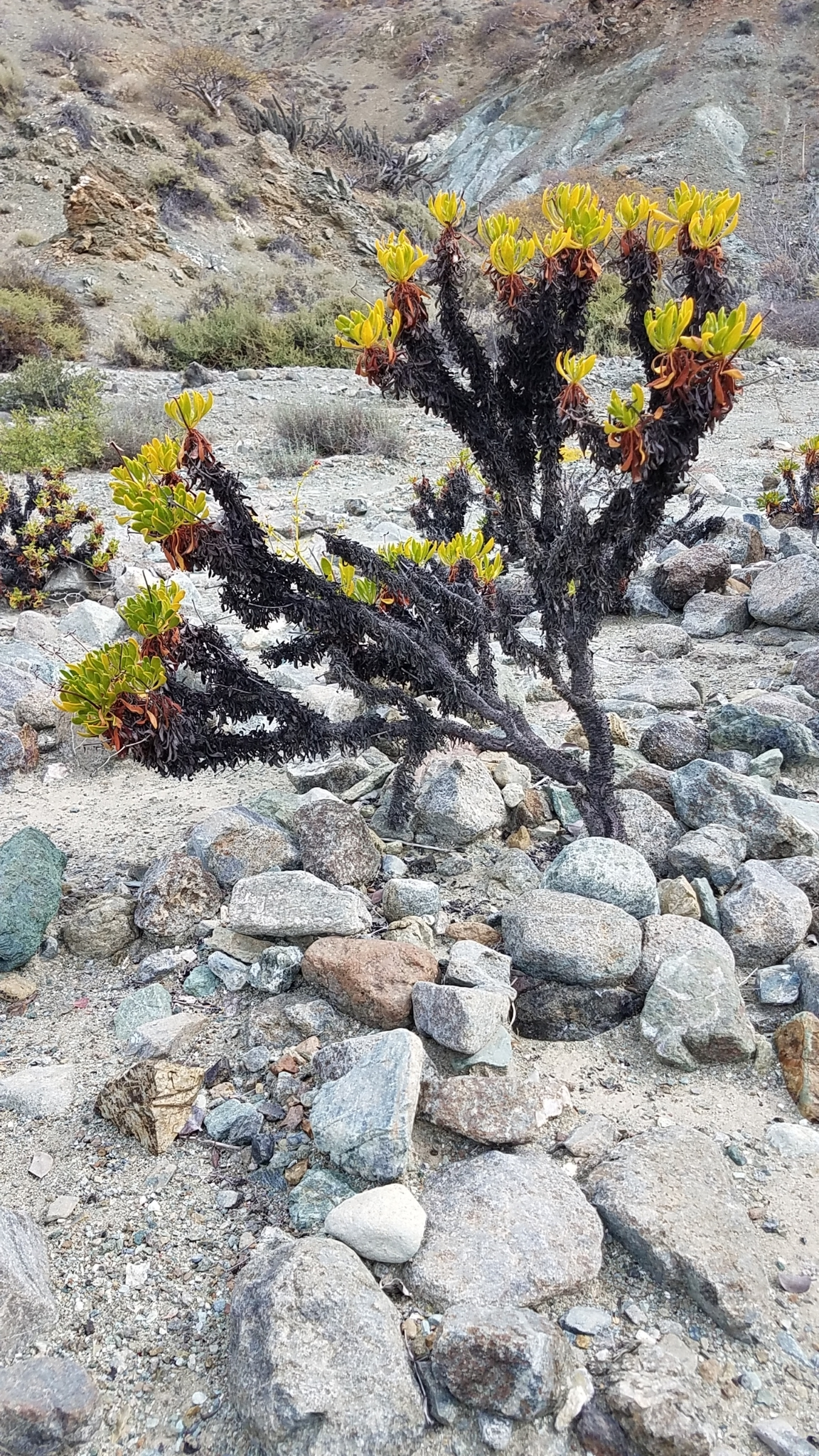

Scientific classification
- Kingdom: Plantae
- Clade: Tracheophytes
- Clade: Angiosperms
- Clade: Eudicots
- Order: Caryophyllales
- Family: Polygonaceae
- Genus: Eriogonum
- Species: E. preclarum

Binomial name
- Eriogonum preclarum Reveal

= Eriogonum preclarum =

Species of plant

Eriogonum preclarum, known commonly as the Puerto Nuevo buckwheat, is a very rare species of perennial wild buckwheat in the family Polygonaceae. It is endemic to the Vizcaíno Peninsula in Baja California Sur, occurring on ultramafic substrates.

== Description ==
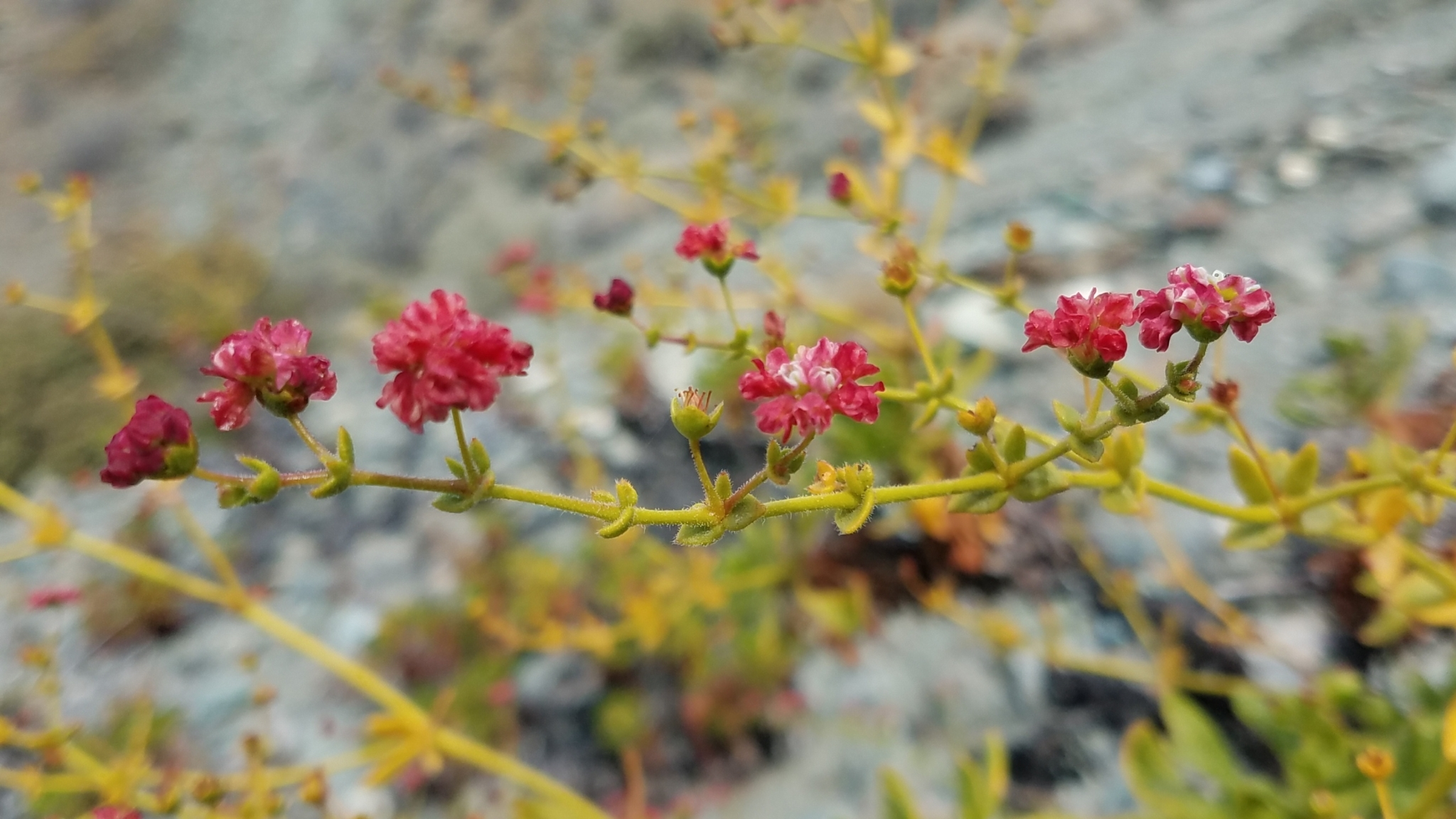
Flowers

This species was regarded by Eriogonum botanist James L. Reveal as "without doubt one of the most distinctive and loveliest species of Eriogonum." Characterized by bright green vegetation, brightly colored flowers, and hairy stems, the species is easily distinguishable in habitat, and with great potential as a rock garden plant.

It is a low, rounded subshrub 10 to 50 cm high, 30 to 80 cm across. It emerges on spreading and weakly erect woody caudices arising out of a stout, gnarled, and woody taproot. The leaves are basal and sheathing up the lower stems from 1 to 8 cm, with the leaf blades ovate to elliptic or rhombic, 1 to 4 cm long, and 0.7 to 2 cm wide. The leaves are thick and persistent, thinly and finely hairy, being bright green in color on both surfaces. The hairs are at their greatest concentration on the margins and the midveins, but the leaves are glabrate in maturity. The petioles are 0.8 to 2 cm long, less hairy but with rather longer hairs than those of the lamina.

The floral stem is erect and somewhat spreading, 3 to 10 cm long, sparsely hairy and colored bright green. The inflorescences are open, 15 to 40 cm long, branching into two or three parts at the first node, and branching in magnitudes of two above the first node. The branches are sparsely hairy and glandular, bright green to yellowish green. The bracts and cauline leaves are also sparsely hairy, glandular and bright green. The bract petioles are 0.5 to 1.5 mm long. The peduncles are slender, 1 to 3 cm long, and are erect to ascending in habit.

The involucres are 2 to 3.5 mm long, 4 to 6 mm wide, hairy on the outer margin. Flowers are reddish outside, yellowish inside, with the exception of pinkish tips to the tepals. The flower shape consists of the tepals uniting around half the length of the flower into a broadly campanulate tube, with this united base being greenish to greenish white, tinged with red on the outside. The filaments are 1.5 to 2.5 mm long, and the anthers are red to purple.

== Taxonomy ==
The type specimen was collected by Reid Moran, in a pebbly bed 1.5 miles above the mouth of the Arroyo de las Casitas, Baja California Sur. The species was described by James L. Reveal. Reveal originally placed the plant in the subgenus Ganysma, but he believed the plant was too distantly related to other members that it warranted a revision into a new section.

== Distribution and habitat ==
The plant occurs in two populations on ultramafic substrates on the Vizcaíno Peninsula, near the fishing village of Puerto Nuevo, southeast of Bahía Tortugas, Baja California Sur, Mexico. Although it occurs in a very local area, it is common.

== Research ==
A specimen of Eriogonum preclarum was collected as part of bio-prospecting research into anti-tumor screening.
