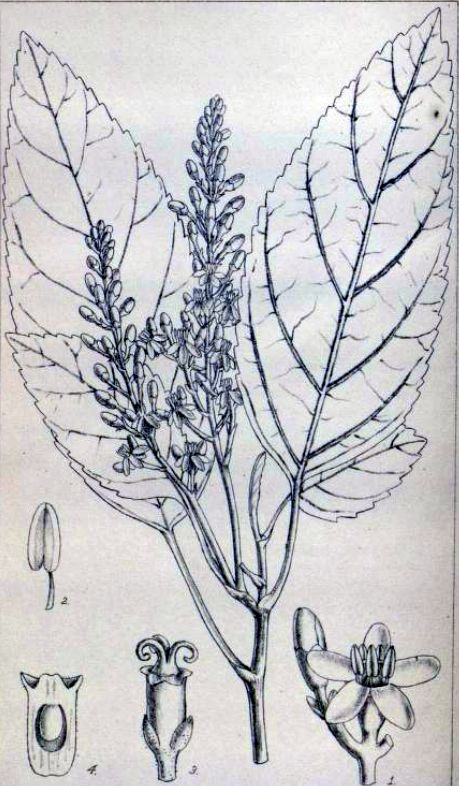
- Melanophylla crenata

Scientific classification
- Kingdom: Plantae
- Clade: Tracheophytes
- Clade: Angiosperms
- Clade: Eudicots
- Clade: Asterids
- Order: Apiales
- Family: Torricelliaceae
- Genus: Melanophylla; Baker

Species
- See text

= Melanophylla =

Genus of flowering plants

Melanophylla is a genus of flowering plants endemic to Madagascar. The genus contains seven species of small trees and shrubs.

Under the APG II system this genus was placed alone in family Melanophyllaceae, but with the rider that "[s]ome of the families are monogeneric and could possibly be merged when well-supported sister-group relationships have been established." In 2004, such a relationship was established between Melanophylla, Aralidium and Torricellia, resulting in the transfer of the first two of these genera into Torricelliaceae.

Species

- Melanophylla alnifolia Baker
- Melanophylla angustior McPherson & Rabenantoandro
- Melanophylla aucubifolia Baker
- Melanophylla crenata Baker
- Melanophylla madagascariensis Keraudren
- Melanophylla modestei G.E.Schatz, Lowry & A.-E.Wolf
- Melanophylla perrieri Keraudren
