= Haloragales =

Order of flowering plants

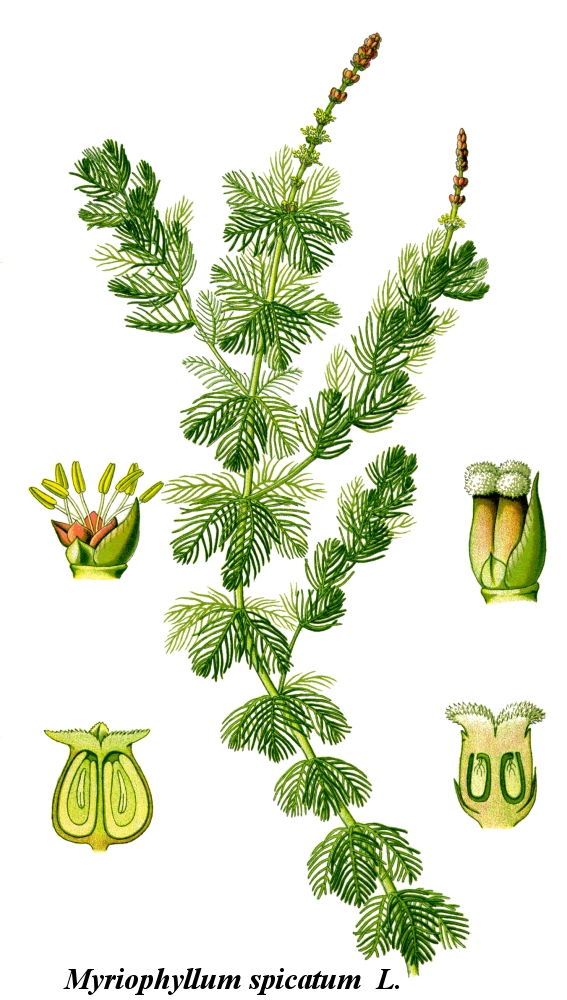
Myriophyllum spicatum

Haloragales is an order of flowering plants. In the Cronquist system of classification of 1981, it was placed in subclass Rosidae and had this circumscription:

- order Haloragales
  family Haloragaceae (this includes water milfoil)
  family Gunneraceae
