= Mitrastemon matudae =

Scientific classification
- Kingdom: Plantae
- Clade: Tracheophytes
- Clade: Angiosperms
- Clade: Eudicots
- Clade: Asterids
- Order: Ericales
- Family: Mitrastemonaceae
- Genus: Mitrastemon
- Species: M. matudae

Binomial name
- Mitrastemon matudae Yamam.

Synonyms

Species of plant

Mitrastemon matudae is a species of flowering plant in the family Mitrastemonaceae, native to southern Mexico, Guatemala, Honduras, and Colombia. It was first formally described by Yoshimatsu Yamamoto in 1936.
