= Asteridae =

Subclass of plants

Asteridae is an obsolete botanical name at the rank of subclass. Composition of the subclass has also varied; however, by definition it always includes the family Asteraceae (Compositae). In the modern APG IV system of classification, asterid and euasterid are names for clades with a composition similar to that of Asteridae.

One of the better-known and more influential systems that formally recognized subclass Asteridae was the Cronquist system devised by botanist Arthur Cronquist, which included the orders:

- Gentianales
- Solanales
- Lamiales
- Callitrichales
- Plantaginales
- Scrophulariales
- Campanulales
- Rubiales
- Dipsacales
- Calycerales
- Asterales

Most of the above orders as defined by Cronquist have definitely been dramatically redefined on the basis of recent molecular systematic studies.

To a large extent Cronquist's subclass Asteridae corresponds with the older concepts of Sympetalae and Tubiflorae, groups that were defined by having their petals united into a tube. However, these older classifications contained some sympetalous families, such as Cucurbitaceae, that are now known not to be closely related. Cronquist's concept also corresponds closely with the APG II group of euasterids but the APG does not formally recognize a group called "Asteridae" (or any other group above the rank of order).

Recent phylogenetic studies have suggested that several families, including three major orders not included in Asteridae by Cronquist, Ericales, Cornales, and Apiales, also belong to the asterid group. The circumscription of subclass Asteridae, as well as the circumscriptions of the orders contained within it, is currently in a state of flux; many systematic botanists refer to these as clades (asterids, euasterids, etc.), rather than use formal names such as subclass Asteridae.
