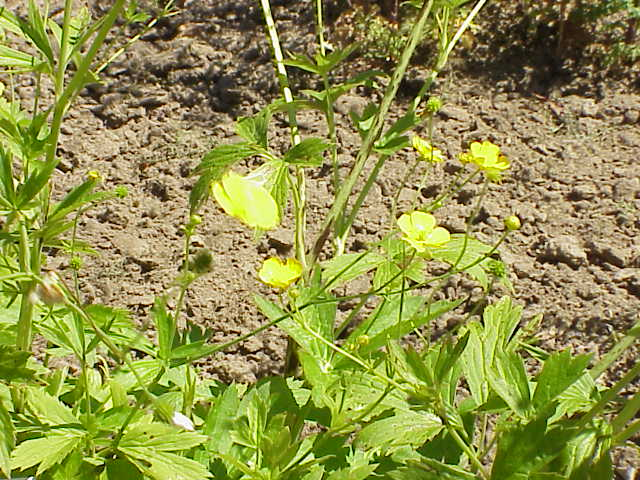

Scientific classification (obsolete system)
- Kingdom: Plantae
- Clade: Tracheophytes
- Clade: Angiosperms
- Subclass: Ranunculidae; Takht. ex Reveal

Type genus
- Ranunculus L.

= Ranunculidae =

Subclass of plants

Ranunculidae is a subclass of flowering plants (Angiosperms) used in some taxonomic systems such as the Takhtajan system or Reveal system. By necessity it includes the order Ranunculales, but otherwise it differs between taxonomic systems. More recent classification systems such as the Angiosperm Phylogeny Group do not use subclasses for Angiosperms.

This grouping was first proposed by Antoine Laurent de Jussieu in 1789 as Ranunculaceae, considered an order within de Jussieu's classification system. It would later be elevated to the rank of subclass by James L. Reveal in 1992, but would become obsolete under the APG III system.
