= Rafflesiales =

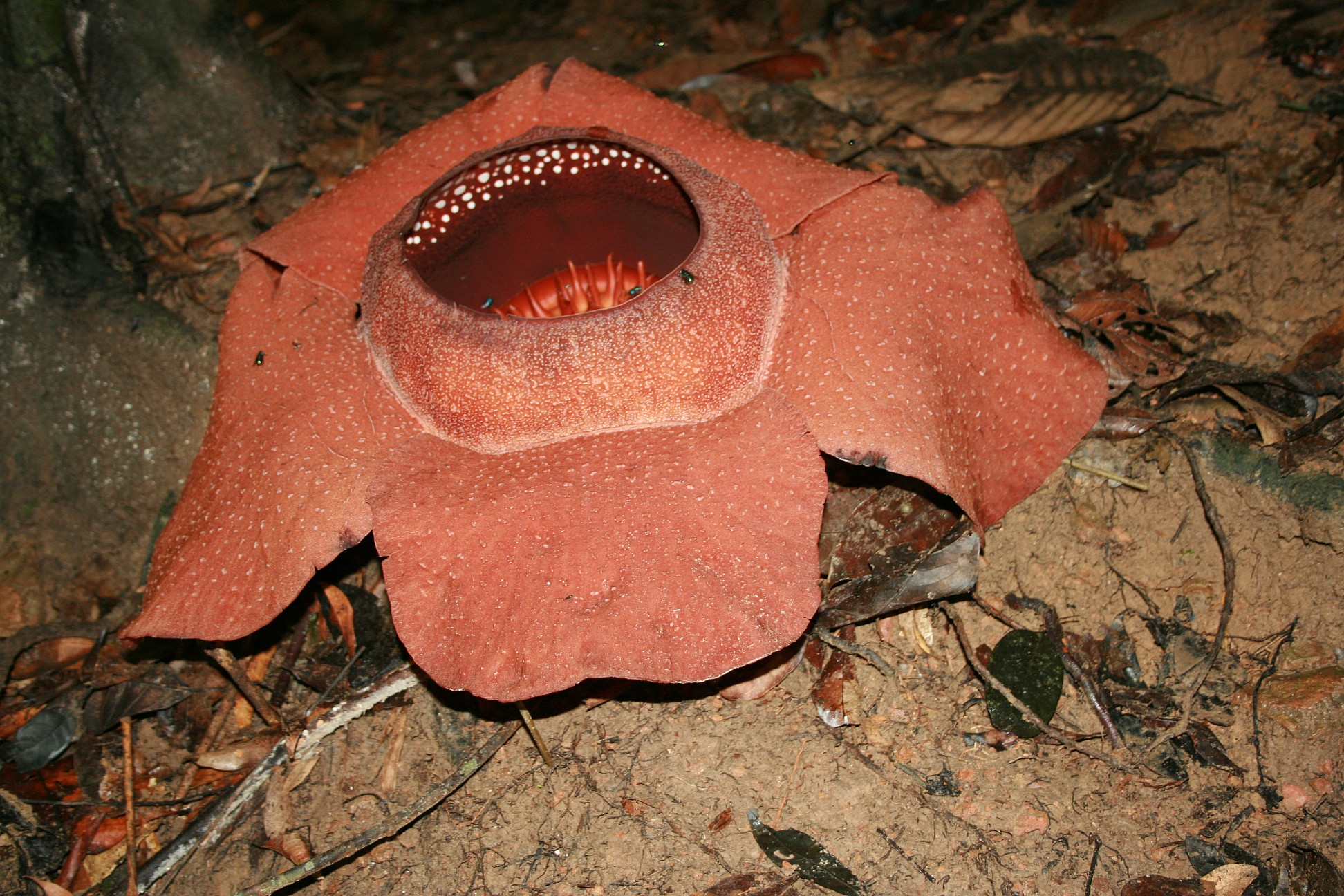
Rafflesia kerrii

Rafflesiales is a botanical name of an order of flowering plants. The name was first published by Oliver in 1895. The Cronquist system used this name for an order placed in subclass Rosidae with the following circumscription (1981) :

- order Rafflesiales
  family Hydnoraceae
  family Mitrastemonaceae
  family Rafflesiaceae

The APG II system regards Rafflesiaceae as an unplaced family of three genera. Also unplaced is the genus Mitrastema. However, APG II does have a placement for family Hydnoraceae, in the order Piperales.

According to the AP-Website, recent research places Rafflesiaceae in order Malpighiales.
