= Euphorbiales =

Order of flowering plants

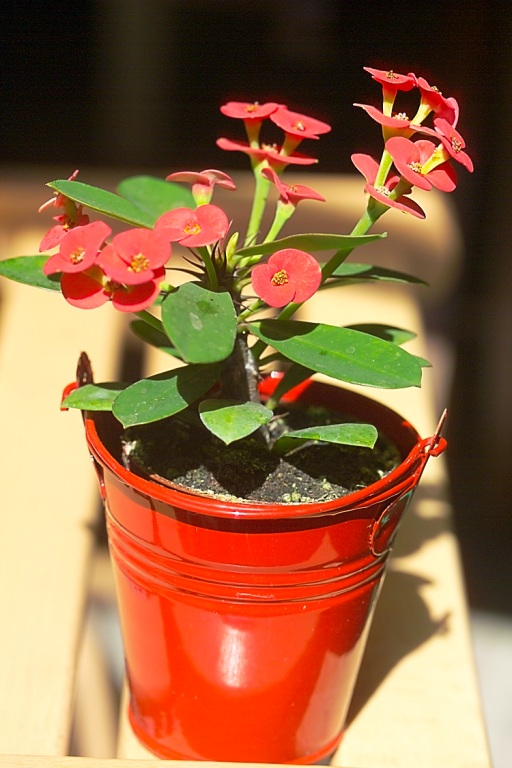
Euphorba milii

Euphorbiales is an order of flowering plants that is not currently recognized in the most authoritative modern treatment of plant taxonomy. In the APG II system (2003) the plants involved are mostly placed in the order Malpighiales.

A well known system that did recognize the order was the Cronquist system (1981) which placed the order in subclass Rosidae and used this circumscription:

- order Euphorbiales
  family Buxaceae
  family Simmondsiaceae
  family Euphorbiaceae (more broadly defined than in the APG II and III systems)
  family Pandaceae
