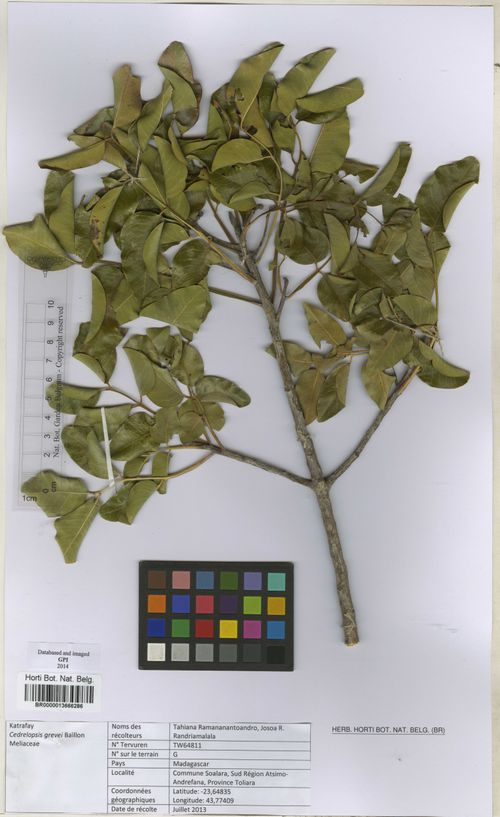
- Cedrelopsis grevei

Scientific classification
- Kingdom: Plantae
- Clade: Tracheophytes
- Clade: Angiosperms
- Clade: Eudicots
- Clade: Rosids
- Order: Sapindales
- Family: Rutaceae
- Subfamily: Cneoroideae
- Genus: Cedrelopsis; Baill.

Species
- See text

Synonyms
- Katafa

= Cedrelopsis =

Genus of flowering plants

Cedrelopsis is a genus in the family Rutaceae found in Madagascar. It is composed of eight species of dioecious or polygamous shrubs and trees of varying sizes. It is found throughout deciduous and xerophyllous forests in Madagascar.

== Species ==
- Cedrelopsis ambanjensis J.F. Leroy
- Cedrelopsis gracilis J.F. Leroy
- Cedrelopsis grevei Baill. & Courchet
- Cedrelopsis longibracteata J.F. Leroy
- Cedrelopsis microfoliolata J.F. Leroy
- Cedrelopsis procera J.F. Leroy
- Cedrelopsis rakotozafyi Cheek & M. Lescot
- Cedrelopsis trivalvis J.F. Leroy

== Gallery ==
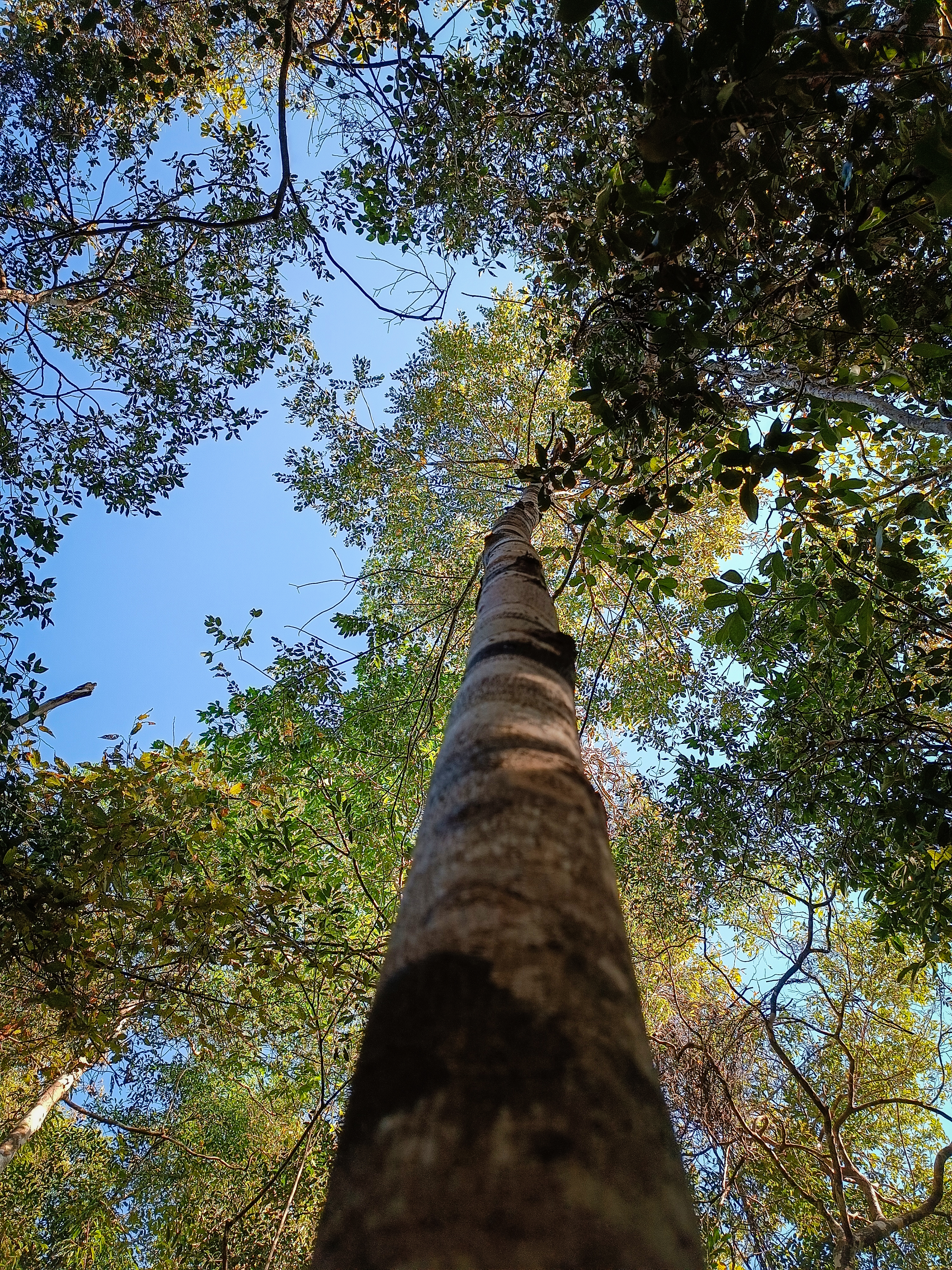
Cedrelopsis grevei (Katrafay)

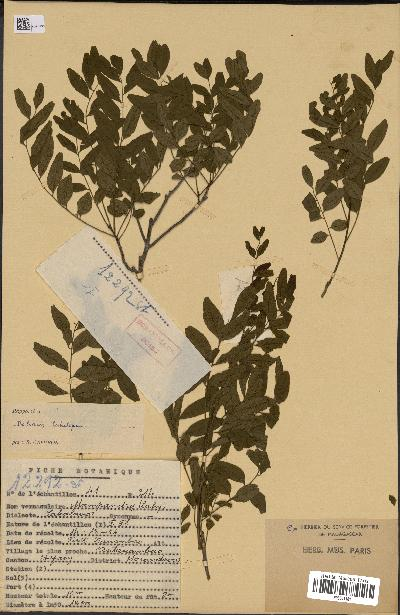
Cedrelopsis gracilis (Healers' tree)

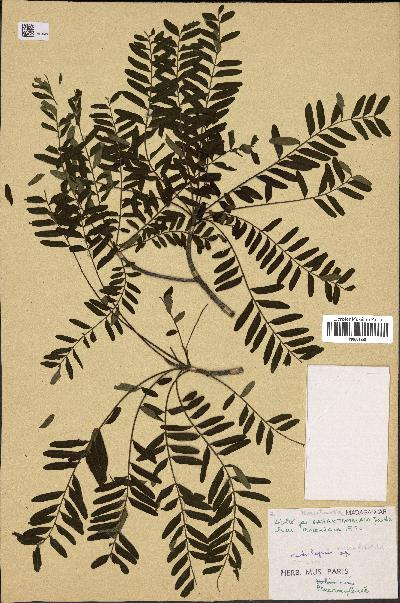
Cedrelopsis microfoliolata (Katafa)

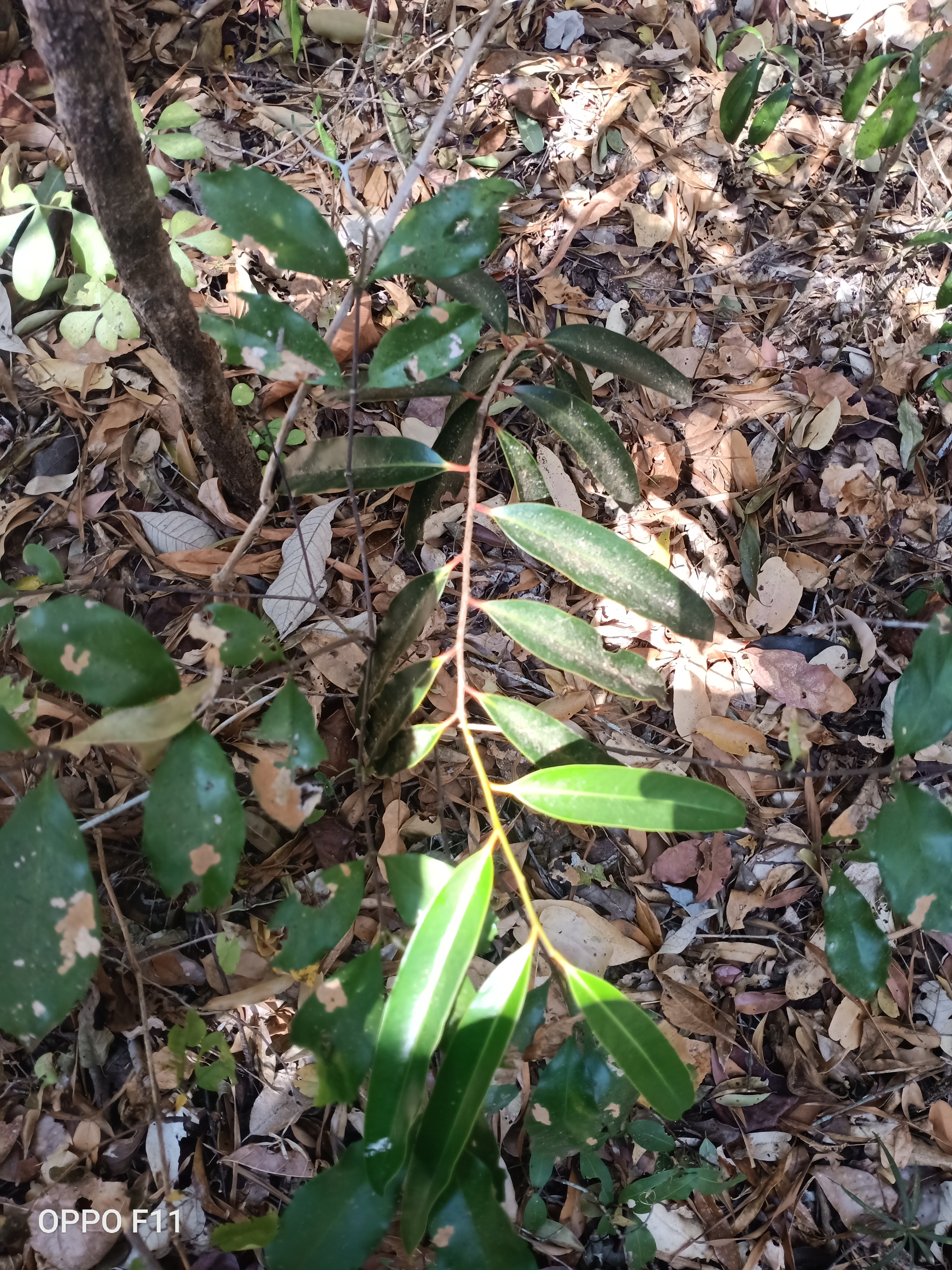
Leaf of katafa
