= Campanulales =

Order of flowering plants

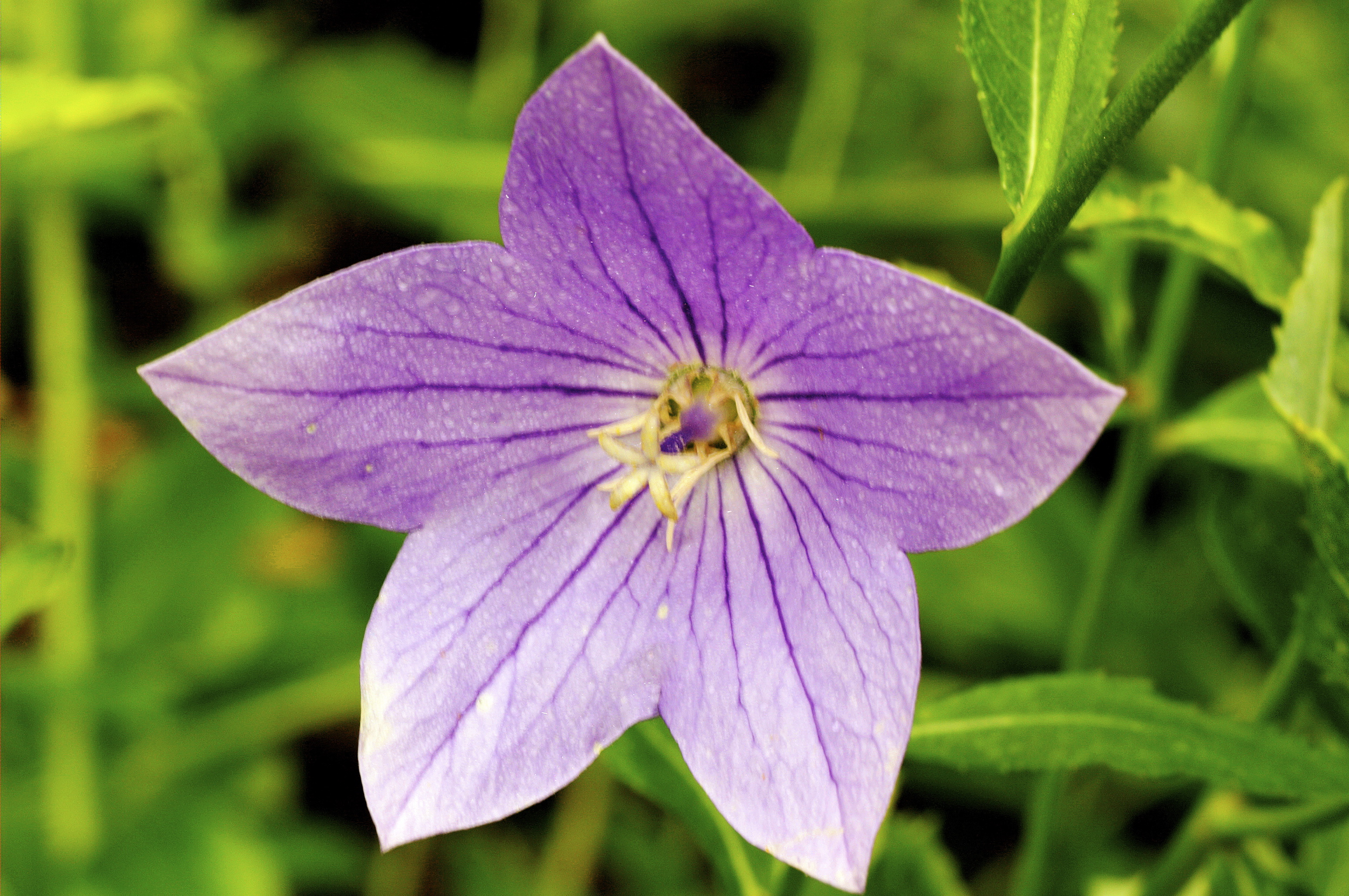
Platycodon grandiflorus

Campanulales is a valid botanic name for a plant order. It was used in the Cronquist system as an order within the subclass Asteridae in the class Magnoliopsida flowering plants. As then circumscribed it included the families:

- Pentaphragmataceae In Watson and Dallwitz this family has 1 genus, Pentaphragma with 30 species from southeast Asia.
- Sphenocleaceae - 1 genus
- Campanulaceae (harebells) - 28 genera
- Stylidiaceae In Watson and Dallwitz it has 5 genera and 150 species.
- Donatiaceae
- Brunoniaceae In Watson and Dallwitz there is only one species in the family, Brunonia australis
- Goodeniaceae (naupaka) - 1 genus

Campanulales is not recognized as an order in the APG II system, where the families are included in order Asterales, except for Sphenocleaceae in Solanales.
