= Linales =

Order of flowering plants

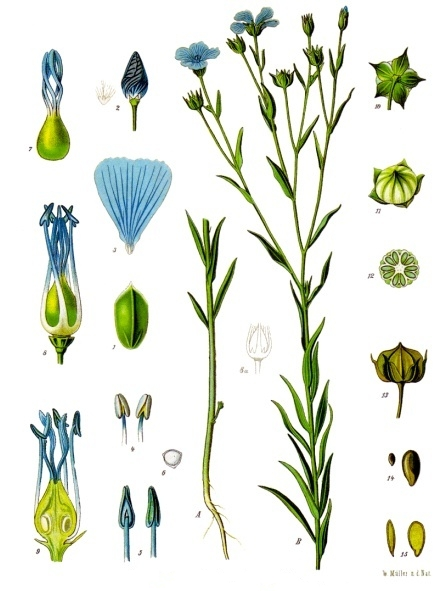
Linum usitatissimum

Linales is a previous botanical name of an order of flowering plants. The Cronquist system used this name for an order placed in subclass Rosidae with the following circumscription in 1981:

- order Linales
  family Erythroxylaceae
  family Humiriaceae
  family Ixonanthaceae
  family Hugoniaceae
  family Linaceae

The APG II system assigns the plants involved to the order Malpighiales.
