= Daphniphyllales =

Order of flowering plants

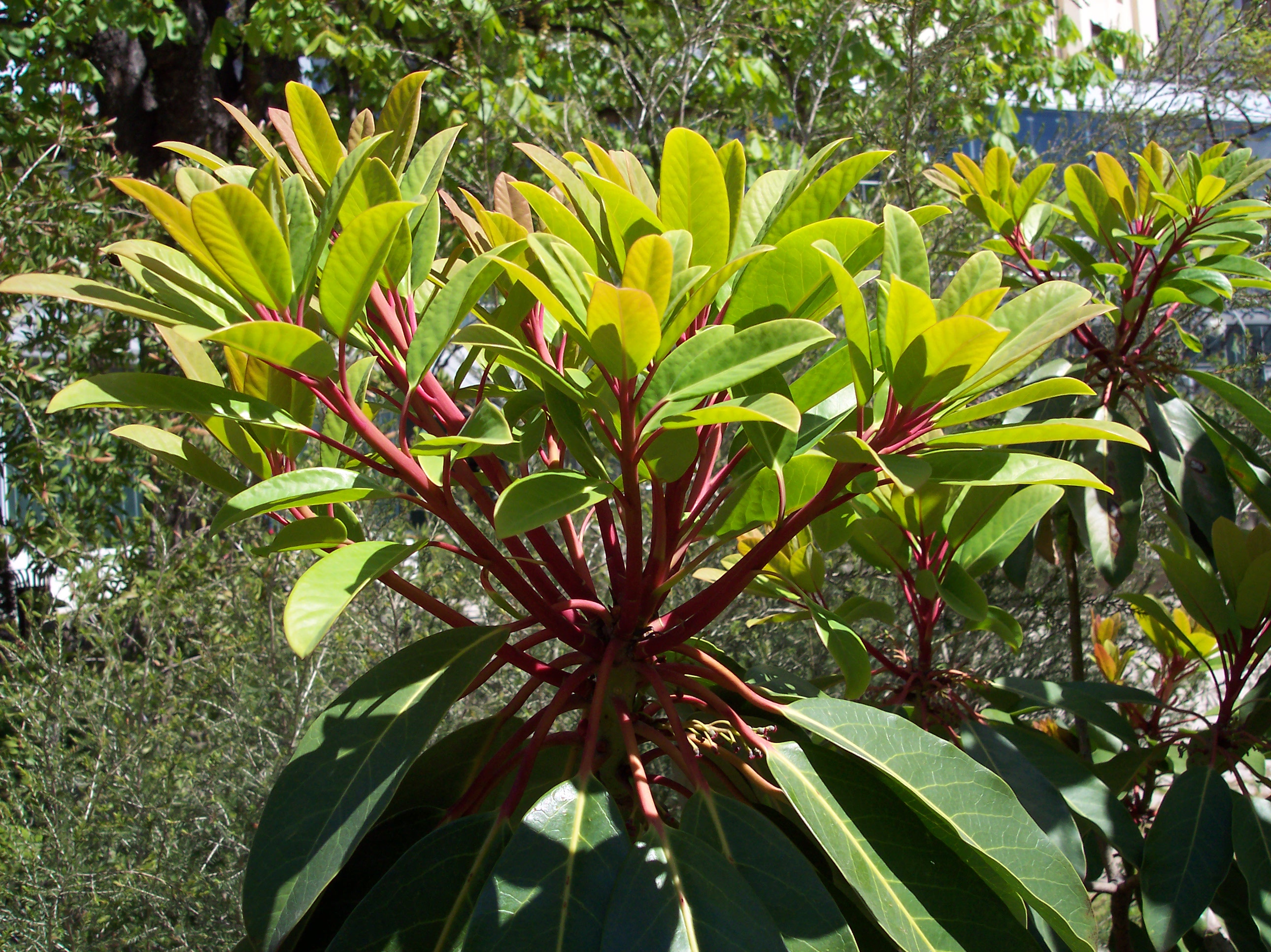
Daphniphyllum macropodum

The Daphiphllales is a valid botanical name for an order of the Magnoliopsida class. When accepted, it had only one family, Daphniphyllaceae. With regard to phylogenetic classification of the APG III system, this order is no longer accepted, and the Daphniphyllaceae are part of the order Saxifragales.
