= Aralidium =

Scientific classification
- Kingdom: Plantae
- Clade: Tracheophytes
- Clade: Angiosperms
- Clade: Eudicots
- Clade: Asterids
- Order: Apiales
- Family: Torricelliaceae
- Genus: Aralidium; Miq.
- Species: A. pinnatifidum

Binomial name
- Aralidium pinnatifidum (Jungh. & de Vriese) Miq.

Genus of flowering plants

Aralidium is a genus in the plant family Torricelliaceae. It includes the single species Aralidium pinnatifidum, a small tree or shrub distributed in southeastern Asia, Malaysia, and Indonesia.

Taxonomic placement of this genus has proven difficult because it possesses characters in common with both the Araliaceae and Cornaceae. In the Cronquist system, it was placed in Cornaceae, but the APG II system give it its own family, Aralidiaceae, with the proviso that "[s]ome of the families are monogeneric and could possibly be merged when well-supported sister-group relationships have been established." Such a relationship was established between Aralidium, Melanophylla and Torricellia in 2004, resulting in the transfer of the first two of these genera into Torricelliaceae.
