= Juglandales =

Order of flowering plants

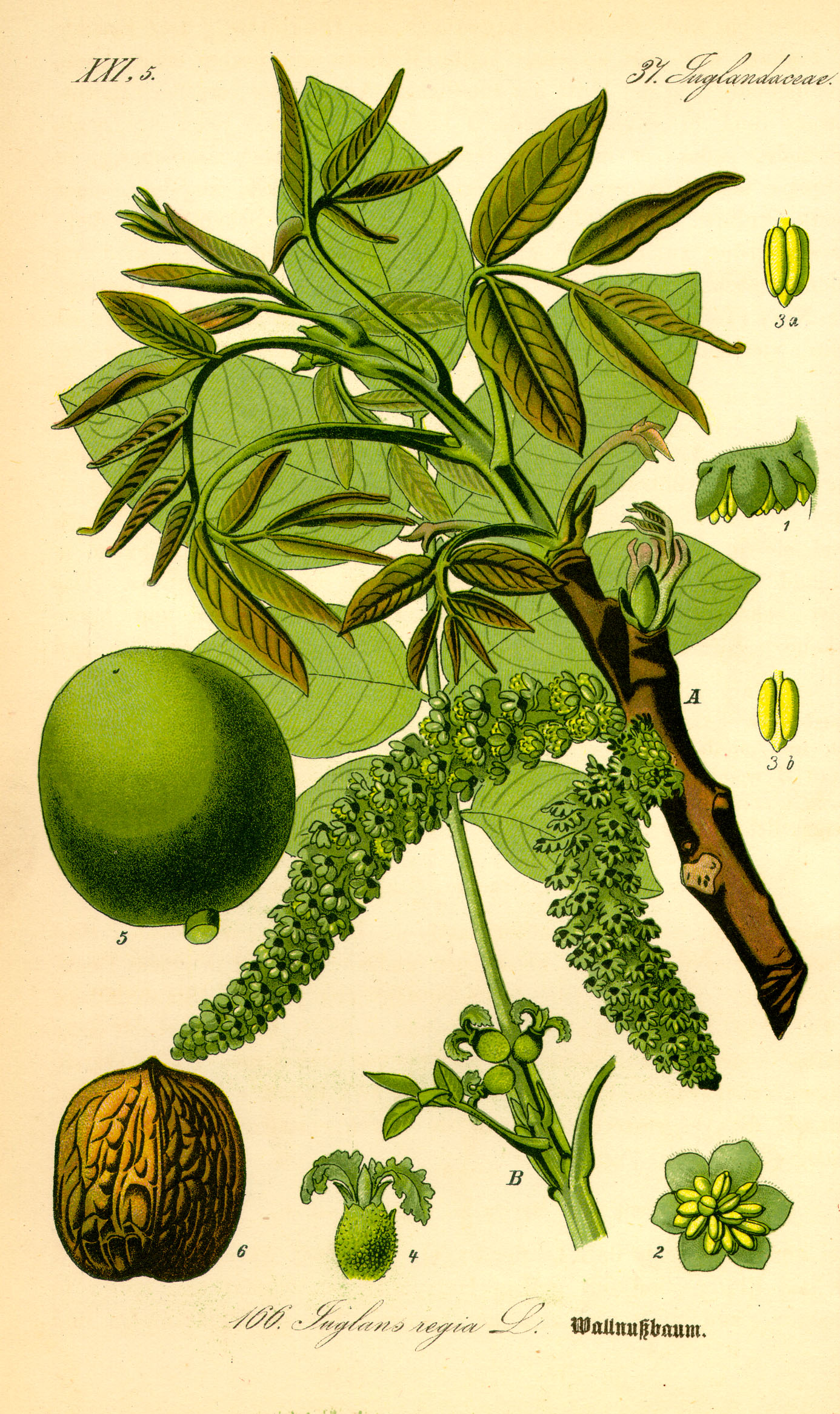
Nogal (Juglans regia)

Juglandales is an order of flowering plants. This order was recognised in several systems (e.g. Engler system and Wettstein system). The Cronquist system placed the order in the subclass Hamamelidae, as comprising the families Juglandaceae and Rhoipteleaceae, the latter consisting of only a single species.

In the APG II system these two families are united into family Juglandaceae (with the split into two families being optional), and the family is placed in the order Fagales.
