= Rhamnales =

Order of plants

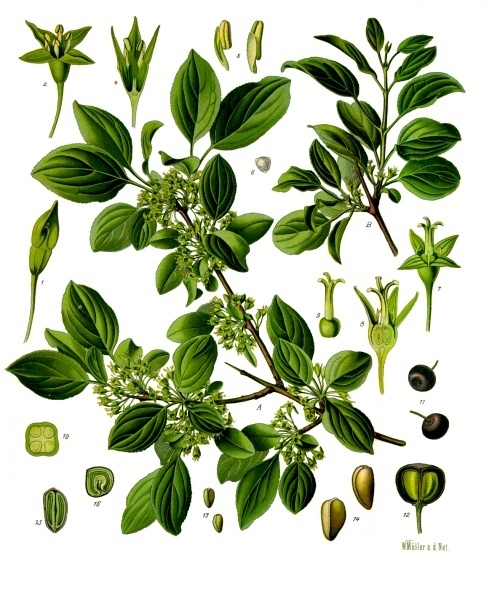
Rhamnus cathartica

The Rhamnales, described by Belgian botanist Dumortier in 1829, is an order of dicotyledon plants in the subclass Rosidae.

== Circumscription ==
In the Cronquist system, the following families were placed in Rhamnales:

- Family Elaeagnaceae – (oleaster family)
- Family Leeaceae
- Family Rhamnaceae (buckthorn family)
- Family Vitaceae (grape family)

In APG system (1998) and APG II system (2003), Rhamnales is recognized as one of the synonyms for order Rosales.

Rhamnales is not recognized by Angiosperm Phylogeny Group since APG III system (2009). The families previously included here under the Cronquist system are included under the following orders:

- Families Elaeagnaceae and Rhamnaceae are placed within Rosales
- Genus Leea, formerly recognized in its own family Leeaceae, is included within family Vitaceae, which is recognized in its own order, Vitales
