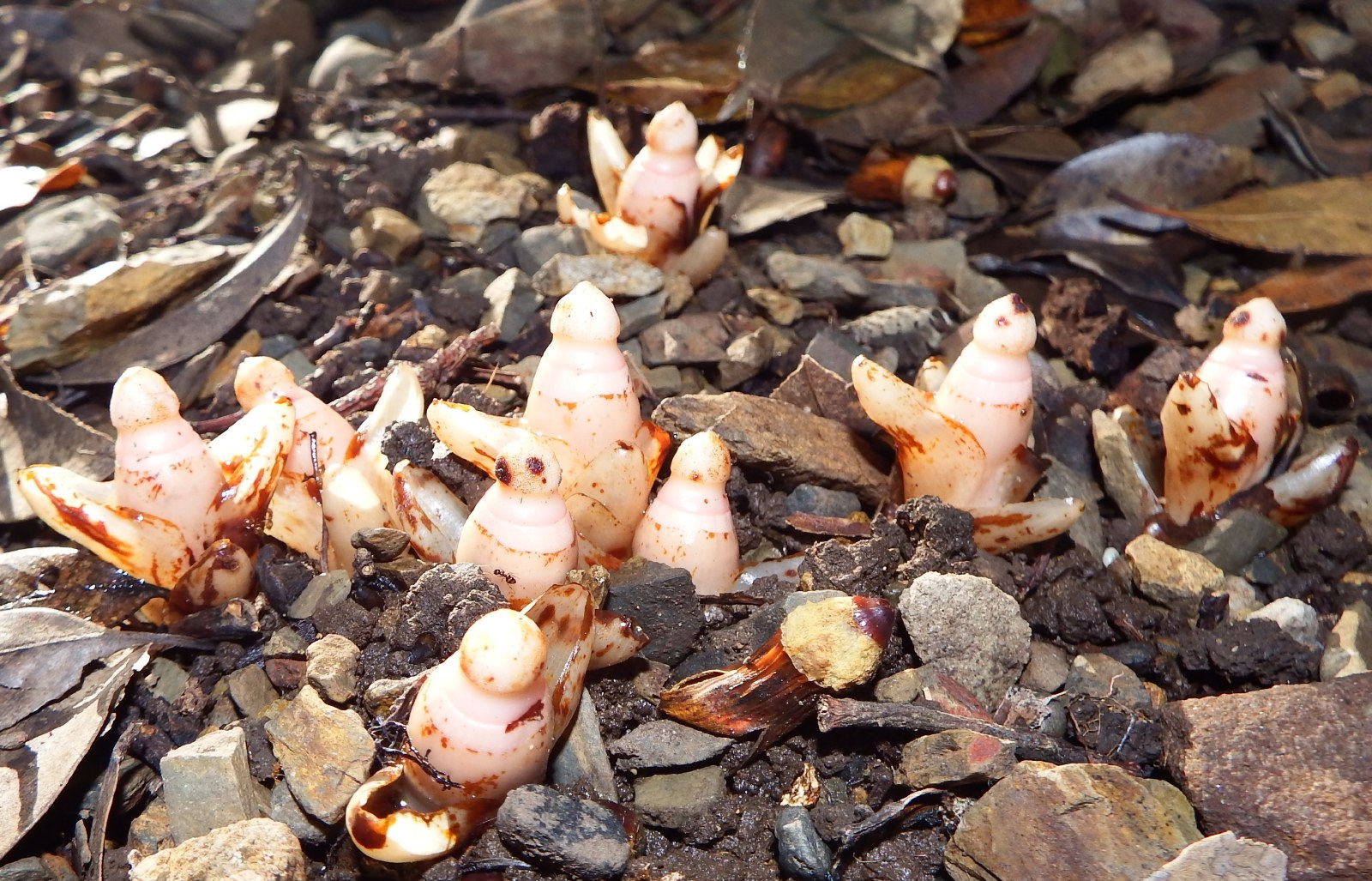

Scientific classification
- Kingdom: Plantae
- Clade: Tracheophytes
- Clade: Angiosperms
- Clade: Eudicots
- Clade: Asterids
- Order: Ericales
- Family: Mitrastemonaceae; Makino
- Genus: Mitrastemon; Makino

Species
- M. matudae M. yamamotoi

= Mitrastemon =

Genus of plants

Mitrastemon is a genus of two widely disjunct species of parasitic plants. It is the only genus within the family Mitrastemonaceae. Mitrastemon species are root endoparasites, which grow on Fagaceae. It is also a non-photosynthetic plant that parasitizes other plants such as Castanopsis sieboldii.

== History ==
The parasitic species, Mitrastemon yamamotoi (Makino) Makino was found in Japan in 1909. It was originally named Mitrastemma yamamotoi Makino by botanist Tomitaro Makino (1862 – 1957), but was later renamed as Mitrastemon yamamotoi in 1911.

Then species Mitrastemon matudae was discovered by botanist Eizi Matuda during an expedition to Mt. Ovando (near the town of Escuintla, Chiapas) in the state of Chiapas, Mexico (Matuda, 1947). The species was originally named by a botanist friend of Matuda, Yoshimatsu Yamamoto (1893-1947), in 1925–1926, but then published in 1936. Mitrastemon yamamotoi is a protandrous plant. Its flowers go through a male phase before transforming into their final female form. The flowers of M. yamamotoi attract a variety of insects ranging from wasps to flies and beetles. Among these, beetles are the best pollinators for this plant since their visit to the flower would pick up a large amount of pollen and they would pollinate from each of the flowers that they had already visited. The plant is endemic to tropical and subtropical forest regions such as southeast Asia and Japan.

== Taxonomy ==
Originally Mitrastemon was placed within the order Rafflesiales, together with other parasitic plants, but this order was long suspected to be actually polyphyletic. In 2004, the genus was found to be related to Ericales by comparing their mitochondrial DNA.

Several orthographic variants of the name Mitrastemon exist, including Mitrastema and Mitrastemma. The correct taxonomic name is Mitrastemon, the use of which was proposed and justified in an article by Reveal and approved by the Nomenclature Committee for Vascular Plants of the International Association for Plant Taxonomy in a subsequent article.

The species has a cylindrical body ranging from 3 cm to 7 cm in height with a tuberous base. During an early developmental stage it appears an off-white color; however, once it is dried it becomes a dark brown color (Mir et al., 2016).

== Life cycle ==
The plant is observed only during the winter season and it completes its visible life cycle from November to April (Mir et al., 2016). Mitrastemon is completely embedded within the tissues of its host, except during the reproduction stage when above-ground parts emerge from host tissues.

== Ecology ==
Unlike other plants, the flowers of this organism change sex from male to female. Various insects are involved in pollination. Mitrastemon yamamotol is mainly pollinated by social wasps, but previously unnoticed pollinators are also important, based on visitation frequency and pollen loads. There have been studies of the pollination that suggest that nocturnal visitors, such as crickets and cockroaches, contribute to geitonogamous pollination. Diurnal visitors like social wasps facilitate outcrossing.

== Species ==
There are two known species;

- Mitrastemon matudae Yamam.
- Mitrastemon yamamotoi (Makino) Makino

== Distribution ==
Mitrastemon yamamotoi is distributed in tropical and subtropical forests of Southeast Asia and Japan. Mitrastemon matudae is distributed from southern Mexico to Colombia.
