= Tubiflorae =

Historic name for group of flowering plants

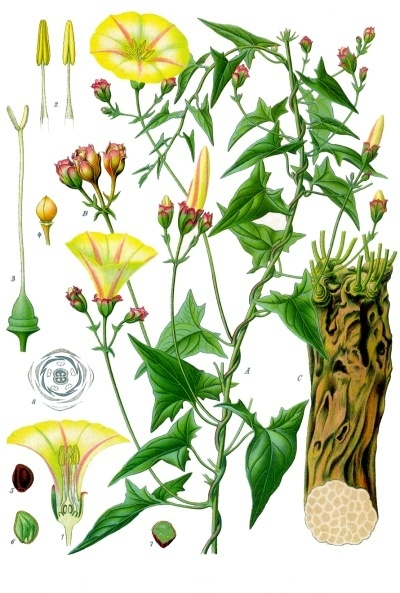
Tubiflorae

Tubiflorae is a botanical name, meaning "with tubular flowers". It was used in the Engler system (and derived systems such as the Wettstein system) for:

- an order in the Sympetalae. This order included such families as Convolvulaceae, Boraginaceae, Scrophulariaceae, Solanaceae, etc. This order does not correspond closely to any one group in the Cronquist system or in the APG II-system, but the component taxa belong in the Lamiales, Scrophulariales and Solanales of the Cronquist system and the euasterids I of the APG II-system.
- a subfamily in the family Compositae (as opposed to the subfamily Liguliflorae).

Note that these days the rules for botanical nomenclature, the ICBN, allow such descriptive botanical names only at a rank above that of family, so that Tubiflorae is allowed as the name of an order, but not as that of a subfamily.
