= Cedrelopsis microfoliolata =

Scientific classification
- Kingdom: Plantae
- Clade: Tracheophytes
- Clade: Angiosperms
- Clade: Eudicots
- Clade: Rosids
- Order: Sapindales
- Family: Rutaceae
- Genus: Cedrelopsis
- Species: C. microfoliolata

Binomial name
- Cedrelopsis microfoliolata J.-F.Leroy

Species of flowering plant

Cedrelopsis microfoliolata is a species of flowering plant in the family Rutaceae. It is endemic to Madagascar.
