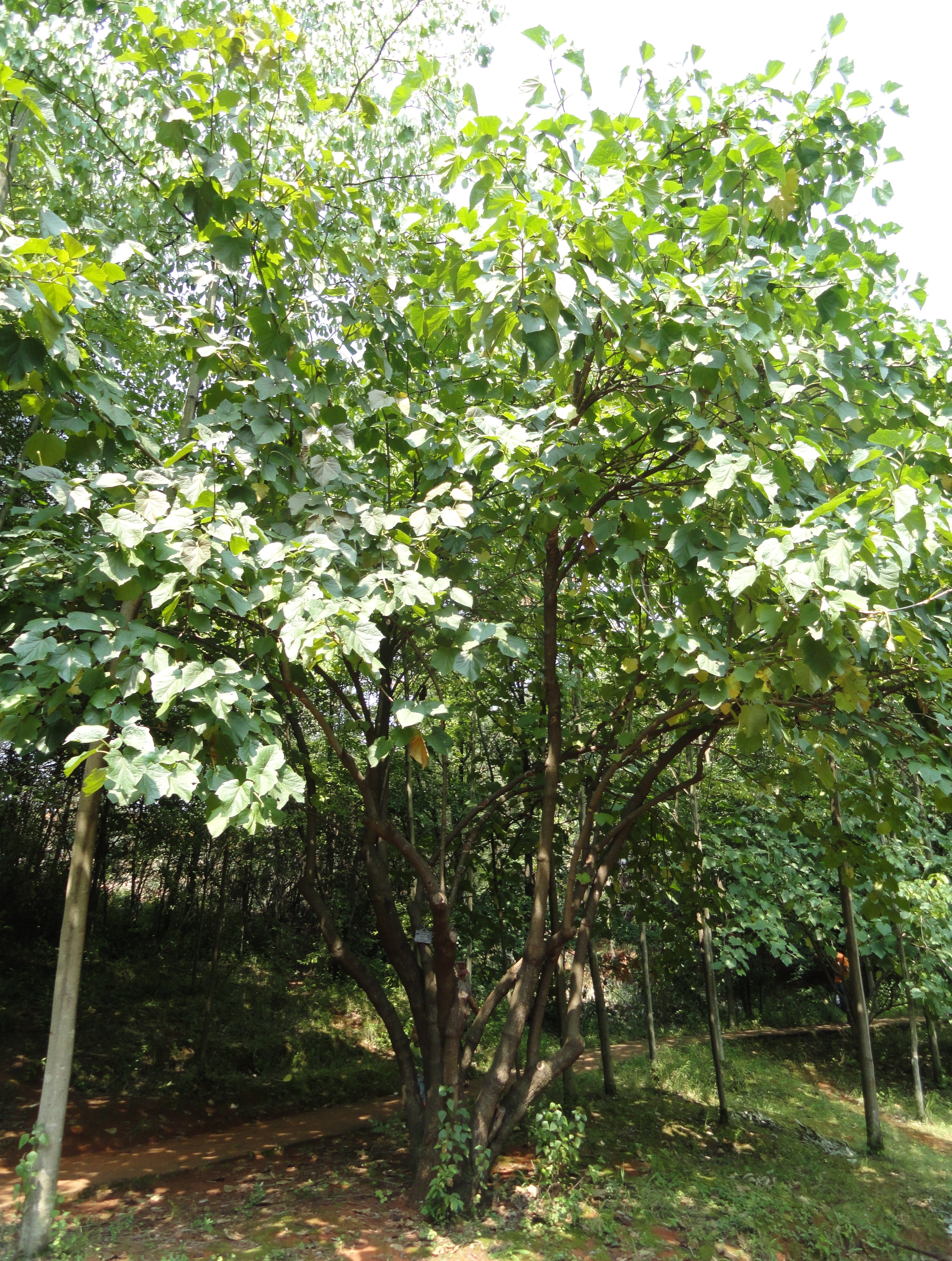
- Toricellia angulata var. intermedia at Kunming Botanical Garden

Scientific classification
- Kingdom: Plantae
- Clade: Tracheophytes
- Clade: Angiosperms
- Clade: Eudicots
- Clade: Asterids
- Order: Apiales
- Family: Torricelliaceae
- Genus: Torricellia; DC.

= Torricellia =

Genus of flowering plants

Torricellia is a genus of flowering plants belonging to the family Torricelliaceae.

It is native to the Eastern Himalayas, Nepal, Tibet, southern China and Vietnam.

Known species:

- Torricellia angulata Oliv.
- Torricellia tiliifolia DC.

The genus name of Torricellia is in honour of Evangelista Torricelli (1608–1647), an Italian physicist and mathematician. It was first described and published in Prodr. Vol.4 on page 257 in 1830.
