= Calycerales =

Order of flowering plants

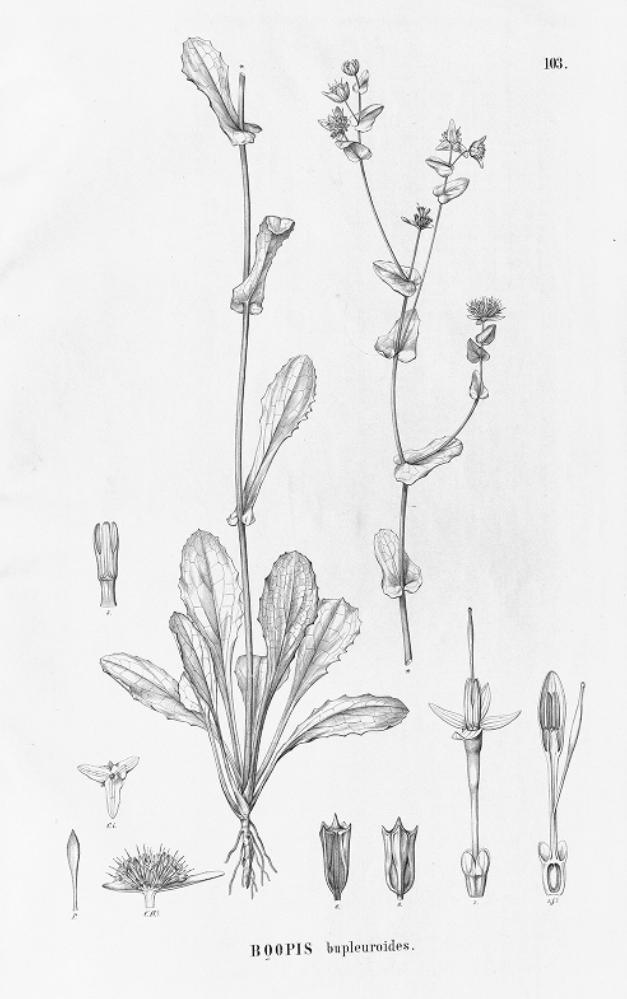
Boopis bupleuroides, a member of the family Calyceraceae

Calycerales is a historically recognized order of flowering plants. When accepted, it included the family Calyceraceae, which is now placed in the Asterales, with Calycerales treated as a synonym of Asterales.
