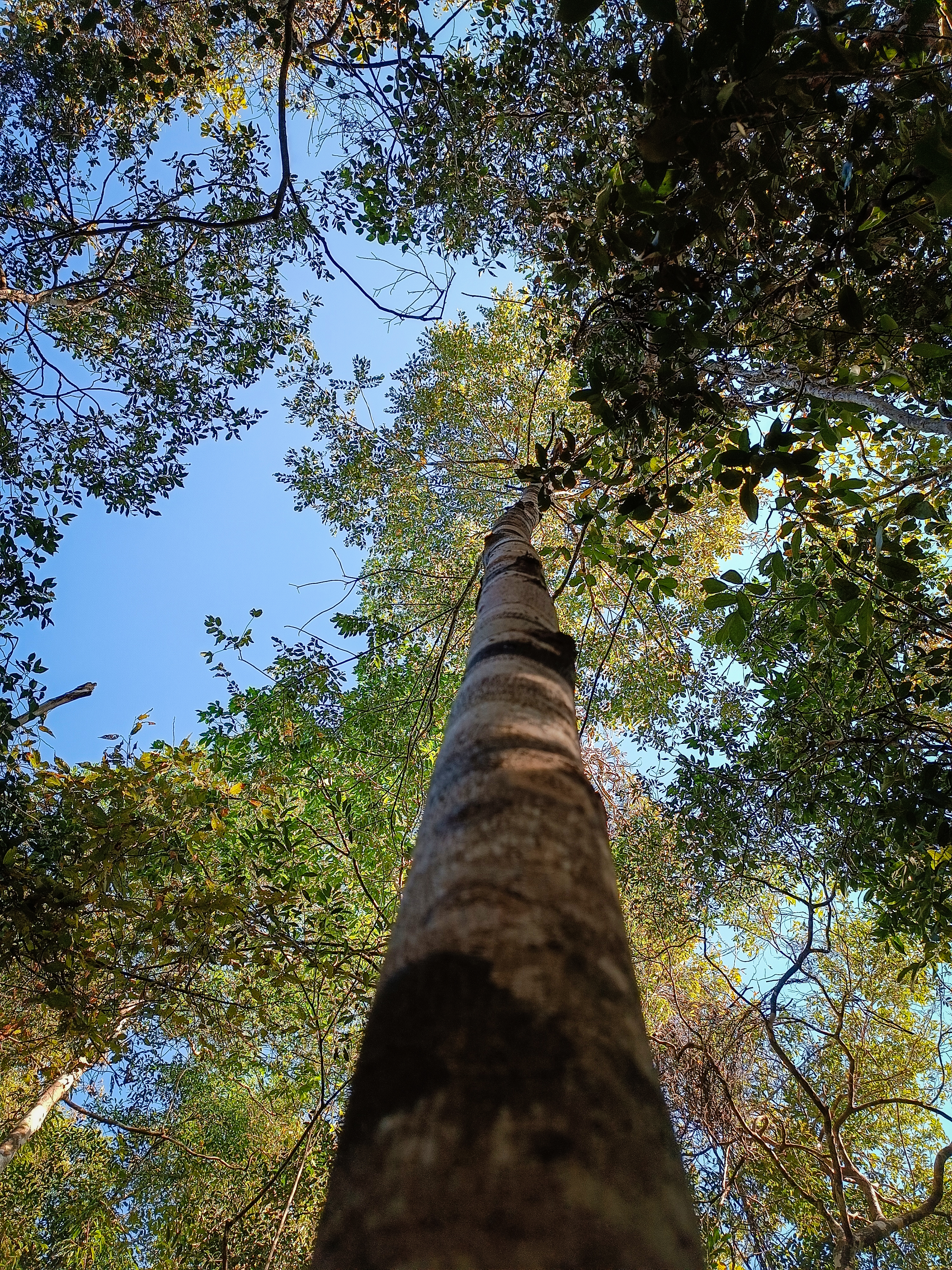
- Katrafay tree

Conservation status
- Least Concern (IUCN 3.1)

Scientific classification
- Kingdom: Plantae
- Clade: Tracheophytes
- Clade: Angiosperms
- Clade: Eudicots
- Clade: Rosids
- Order: Sapindales
- Family: Rutaceae
- Genus: Cedrelopsis
- Species: C. grevei

Binomial name
- Cedrelopsis grevei (Baill.) & Courchet

Synonyms
- Katafa crassisepalum Costantin & Poisson

= Cedrelopsis grevei =

Species of tree

Cedrelopsis grevei is an endemic species of tree found in Madagascar. In Malagasy, it is called katafa or katrafay.

== Description ==
It grows in dry, subarid and subhumid bioclimates, on the West coast in the provinces of Toliara (Tuléar), Mahajanga and Antsiranana (Diego Suarez) in altitudes from 0–900 m. It grows as bush-like tree with a diameter of 0.2 to 1.5 m, reaching a height of 2–9 m. Leaf size is 12–20 cm x 6–8 cm.

== Uses ==
Its stem bark and leaves are used for the production of essential oil that is used in traditional medicine to relieve malaria, fever and muscular fatigue

The wood of the katafa is resistant to rot and insects; it was used for the construction of royal tombs. Its wood is used for construction purposes.

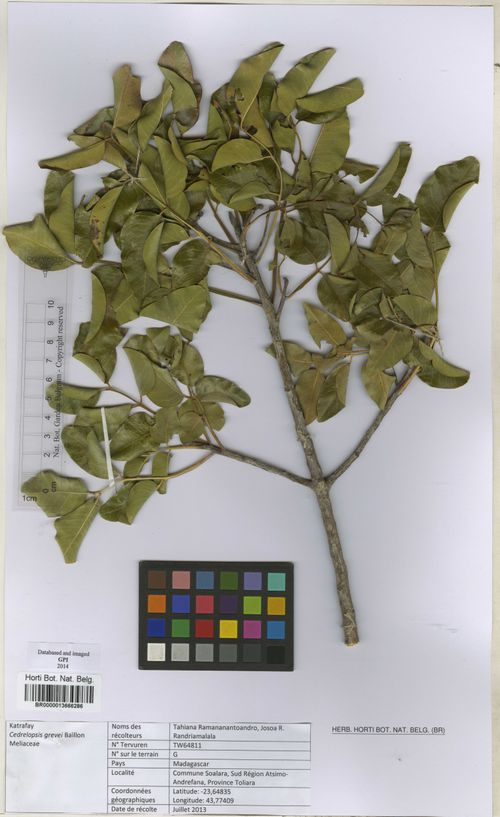
dried Cedrelopsis grevei

== Ecology ==
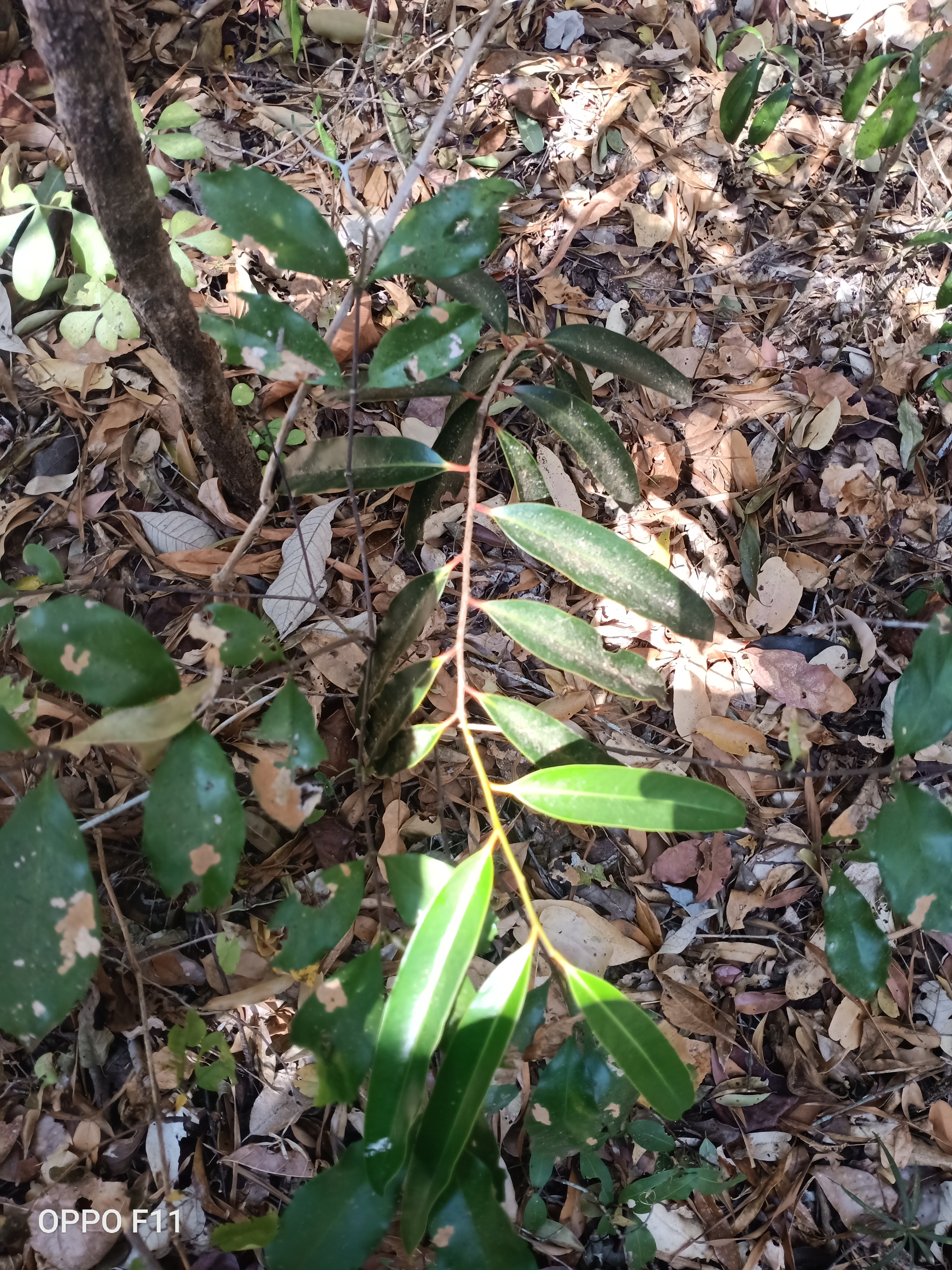

Cedrelopsis grevei is considered being of Least Concern (LC).

== Synonyms ==
- Katafa crassisepalum Costantin & Poiss.
