= Hamamelididae =

Subclass of flowering plants

Hamamelididae is an obsolete botanical name at the rank of subclass. Because some hamamelidid members bear aments (i.e., catkins), this subclass has been formerly known as Amentiferae. Based on molecular phylogeny works, Hamamelididae appears to be a polyphyletic group.

A well-known system that used the name Hamamelididae is the Cronquist system, although in the disallowed spelling Hamamelidae. In the original 1981 version of this system the circumscription was:

- subclass Hamamelidae
  order Trochodendrales
  order Hamamelidales
  order Daphniphyllales
  order Didymelales
  order Eucommiales
  order Urticales
  order Leitneriales
  order Juglandales
  order Myricales
  order Fagales
  order Casuarinales

As is true for any botanical name, circumscription of the subclass will vary with the taxonomic system being used; the only requirement being that it includes the family Hamamelidaceae. The APG II system does not recognize named taxa above the rank of order but places most of the taxa involved in the rosids clade, with Hamamelidaceae itself in order Saxifragales.
