= Rosidae =

Subclass of plants

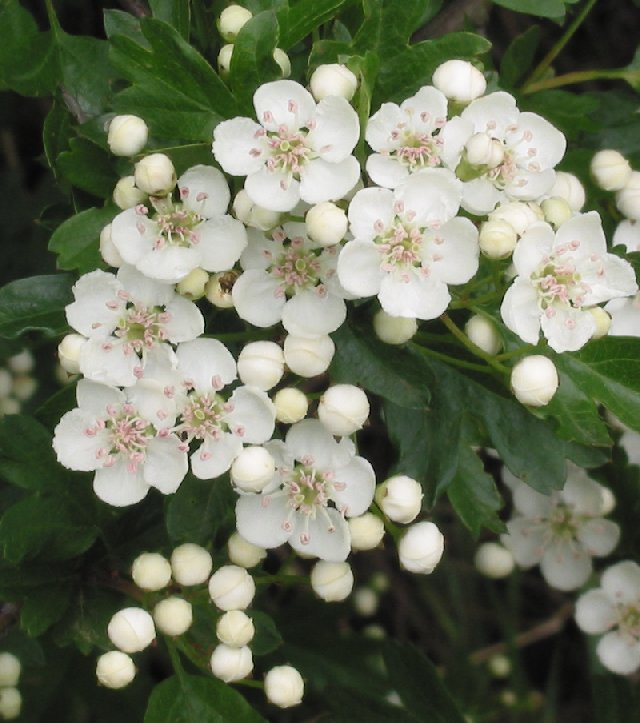
typical flower

Under the International Code of Nomenclature for algae, fungi, and plants (ICN), Rosidae is a botanical name at the rank of subclass. Circumscription of the subclass will vary with the taxonomic system being used; the only requirement being that it includes the family Rosaceae.

Under Phylocode, Rosidae is a clade defined as the most inclusive crown clade containing Rosa cinnamomea, but not Berberidopsis corallina nor Dillenia indica nor Gunnera manicata nor Helianthus annuus nor Saxifraga mertensiana nor Stellaria media nor Viscum album.

A well-known example of Rosidae as governed by the ICN was in the Cronquist system. In the 1981, original, version of that system, the circumscription was as follows.

- subclass Rosidae

order Rosales order Fabales order Proteales order Myrtales order Rhizophorales order Cornales	order Santalales order Rafflesiales order Celastrales order Euphorbiales order Rhamnales	order Linales order Polygalales order Sapindales order Geraniales order Apiales

The Phylocode definition includes Crossosomatales, Geraniales, Myrtales, Fabidae (Celastrales, Cucurbitales, Fabales, Fagales, Huaceae, Oxalidales, Malpighiales, Rosales and Zygophyllales), Malvidae (Brassicales, Huerteales, Malvales, and Sapindales) as they are defined in the APG III system. This definition was formulated in 2007, and is agnostic on the inclusion or exclusion of Picramniales and Vitales. Since 2007, the phylogenetic positions of Picramniales and Vitales have been clarified. The position of Picramniales as sister to Malvidae sensu stricto requires it to be included among the rosids. Vitales is sister to the clade of all that must be included in the rosids and its inclusion is optional. In APG III, it was included.

There is considerable overlap between the two definitions. Some apparent differences are the result of more broadly drawn orders in the second. Apiales, Cornales, Proteales and Santalales, and parts of Rafflesiales (sensu Cronquist) are excluded from the second, and many groups from Cronquist's Hamamelidae and Dillenidae are included.

In both senses, the term "rosid" applies, as an adjective and noun, to members of the group. In the APG III system, which eschewed formal botanical names between the ranks of class and order, the term "rosids" is used to define an informal clade corresponding to Rosidae as defined in the Phylocode.
