= Rubiales (plant) =

Order of flowering plants

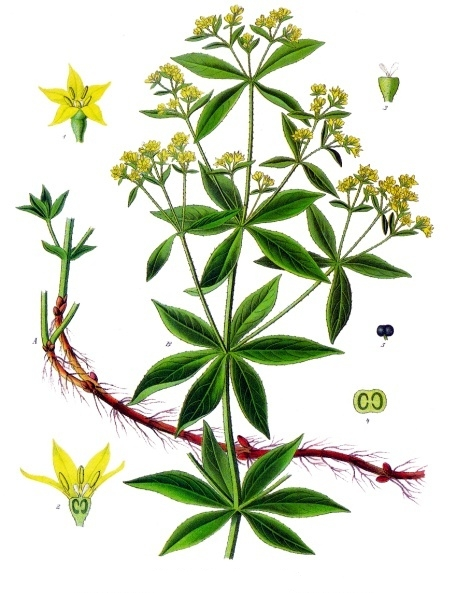
Rubia tinctorum

Rubiales was an order of flowering plants in the Cronquist system, including the families Rubiaceae and Theligonaceae. The latest APG system (2016) does not recognize this order and places the families within Gentianales.
