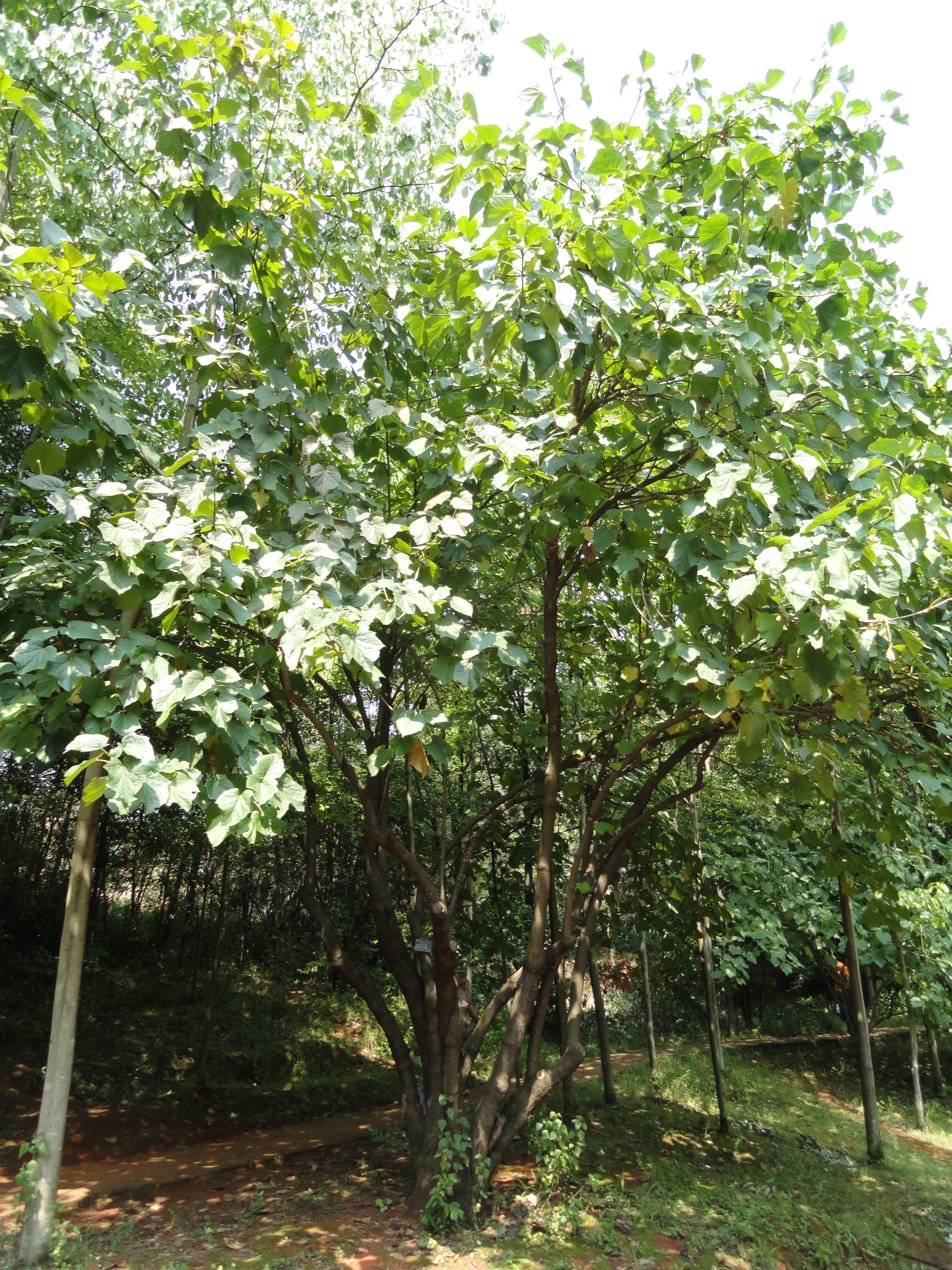
- Toricellia angulata var. intermedia

Scientific classification
- Kingdom: Plantae
- Clade: Tracheophytes
- Clade: Angiosperms
- Clade: Eudicots
- Clade: Asterids
- Order: Apiales
- Family: Torricelliaceae; Hu

Genera
- Aralidium; Melanophylla; Torricellia

= Torricelliaceae =

Family of trees

The Torricelliaceae are a family of trees native to Madagascar and southwest Asia. It contains three genera, Aralidium, Melanophylla and Torricellia. Under the APG II system, each of these genera was placed in its own family, but with the proviso that "Some of the families are monogeneric and could possibly be merged when well-supported sister-group relationships have been established." Such a relationship was established for these three genera in 2004. In the APG III system, these three genera constitute the family Torricelliaceae.
