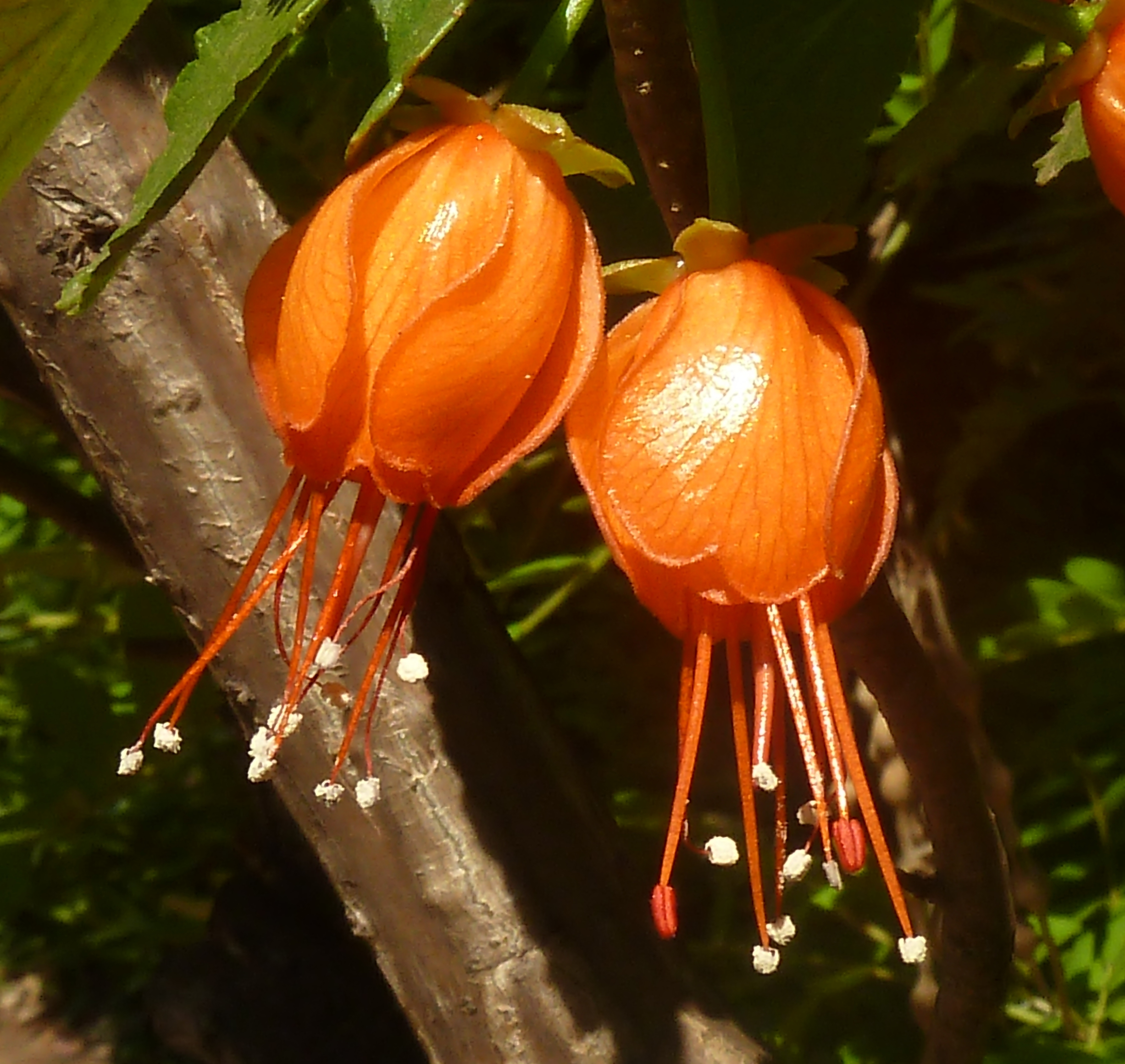

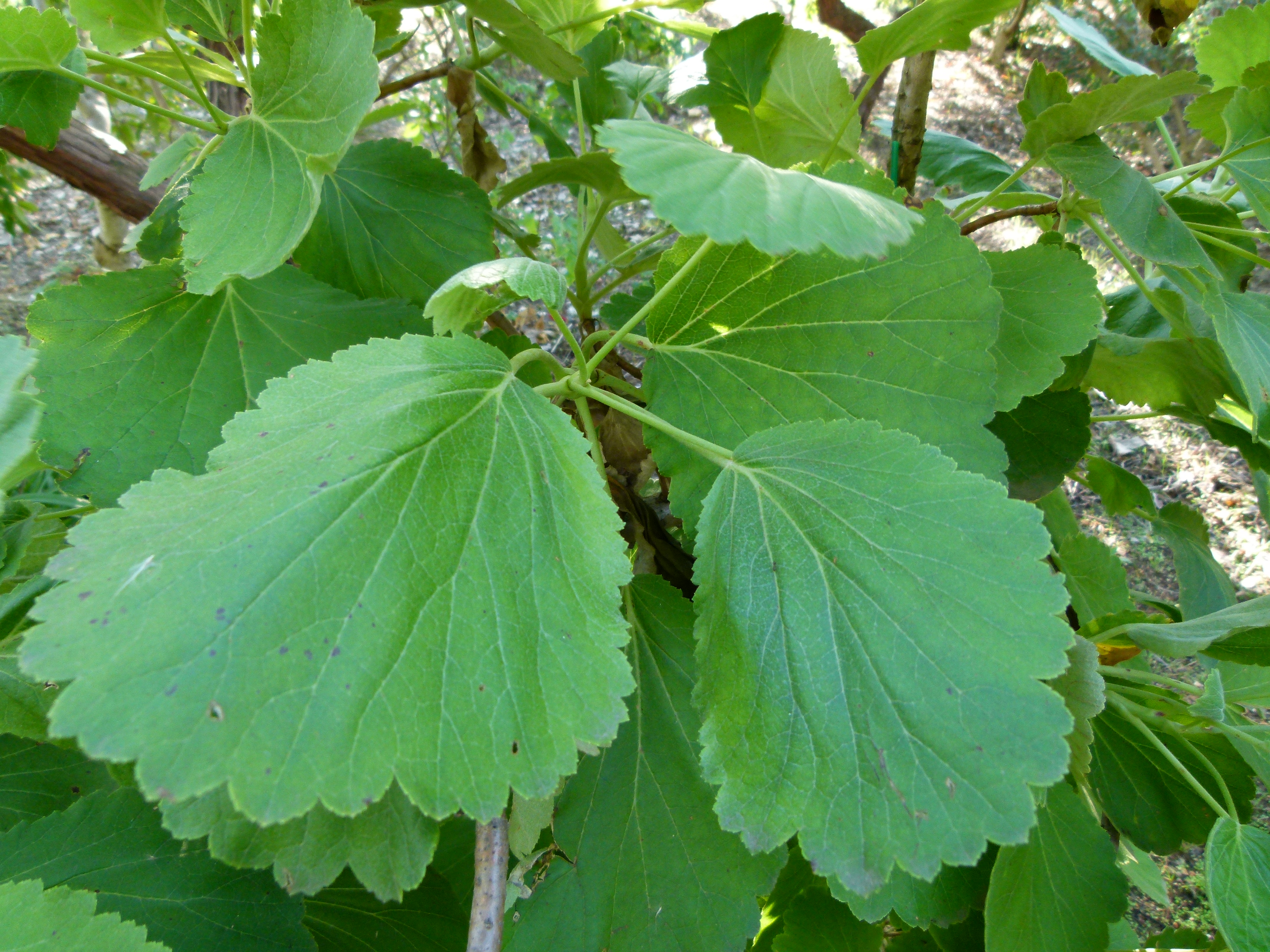

Conservation status
- Data Deficient (IUCN 2.3)

Scientific classification
- Kingdom: Plantae
- Clade: Tracheophytes
- Clade: Angiosperms
- Clade: Eudicots
- Clade: Rosids
- Order: Geraniales
- Family: Francoaceae
- Genus: Greyia
- Species: G. flanaganii

Binomial name
- Greyia flanaganii Bolus

= Greyia flanaganii =

Kei bottlebrush

Species of flowering plant

Greyia flanaganii, commonly known as the Kei bottlebrush, is a species of plant in the Francoaceae family. Greyia flanaganii is one of the related species of the taxonomically isolated and endemic southern African family, the Greyiaceae. Greyia flanaganii is endemic to the Eastern Cape Province of South Africa. It is named after Henry George Flanagan, a South African farmer and botanist from Komga, Eastern Cape, South Africa.

== Description ==
It is more often a shrub than a small tree. The lower side of the leaves are covered in dense hairs, similar to those of the woolly bottlebrush, but the leaves are less strongly lobed around the base.

== Range ==
It is present in the hills and rocky valleys around Grahamstown, but may be found from Queenstown to Komga in the Eastern Cape. It is indicated as rare on the SANBI red data list, but is not threatened by extinction. They are usually found growing as individuals, and are distributed in about 10 known subpopulations.

== Relationships ==
The two related species in Greyiaceae, namely Greyia radlkoferi and Greyia sutherlandii are dormant and leafless in winter, unlike Greyia flanaganii, which is evergreen. Greyia radlkoferi is found in the Mpumalanga and eastern Limpopo provinces South Africa, while Greyia sutherlandii is from KwaZulu-Natal, South Africa. The greyias of South Africa do not appear to have close similarities with other plant genera in the world, and some botanists support a theory that they deserve a separately place in the world of trees. Greyiaceae was formerly placed in a monotypic order between the Saxifragales and Francoyales.
