= Vivianiaceae =

Extinct family of flowering plants

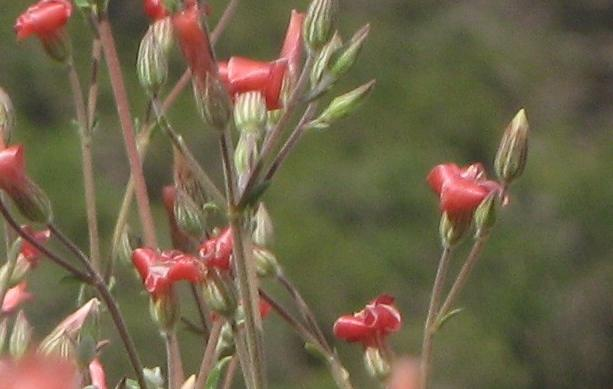
Viviania marifolia

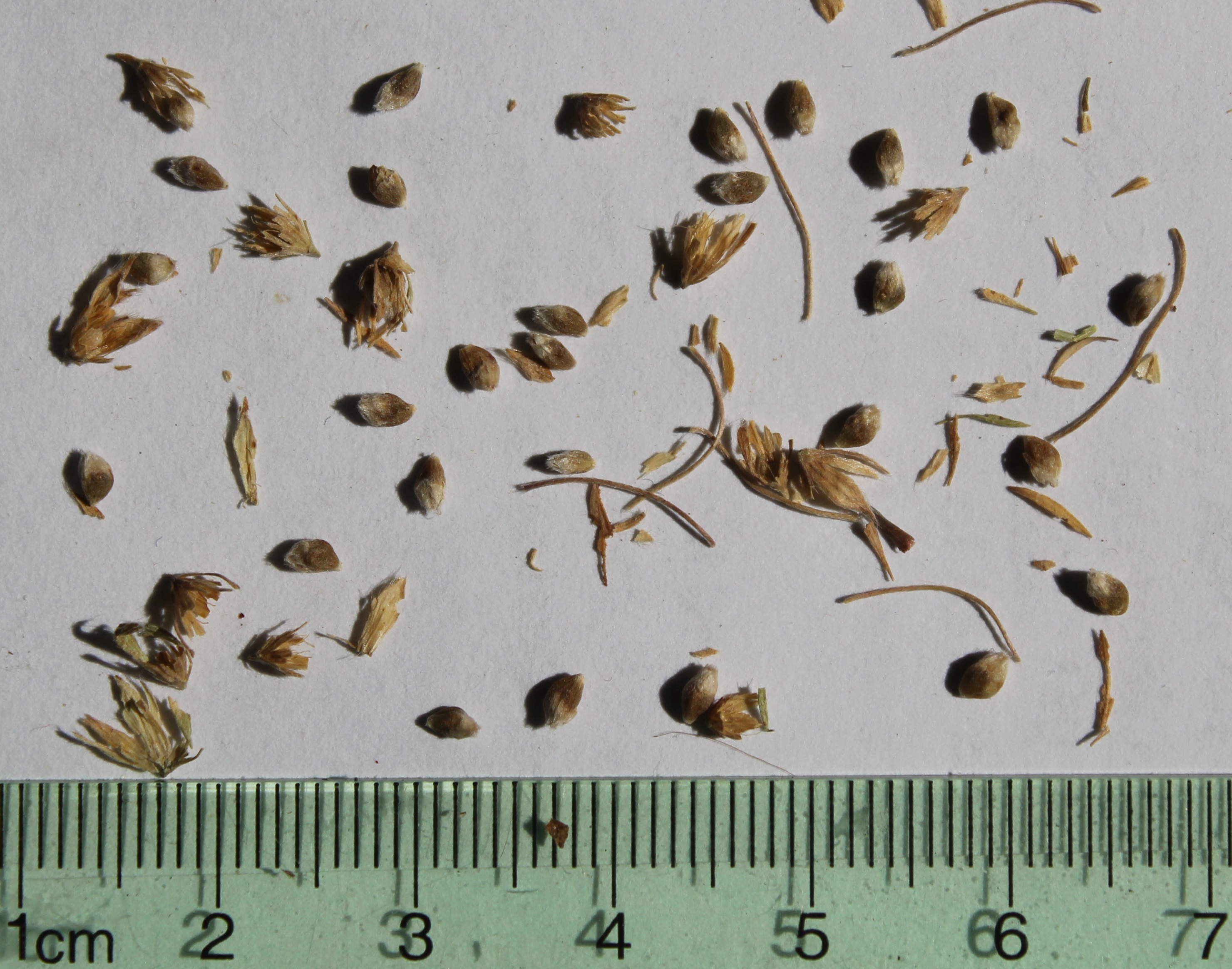
Wendtia gracilis seeds

Vivianiaceae was a family of flowering plants placed in the order Geraniales. The family name is derived from the genus Viviania Cav. It includes both the genus Viviania and Balbisia. The family is now wholly incorporated into the family Francoaceae.

There were around 1-4 genera in Vivianiaceae (Araeoandra, Caesarea, Cissarobryon, Viviania; with all of four genera can be merged into one genus), and under the APG III system the genera from Ledocarpaceae - Balbisia (incl. Ledocarpon), Rhynchotheca, and Wendtia - are now included within the Vivianiaceae.

A relationship with Caryophyllales, was formerly suggested; but morphology (S-plastids) and chemistry are close to Geraniales.
