= Septemtrionalis =

Septemtrionalis may refer to:

- Senna septemtrionalis, the arsenic bush
- Tritonia septemtrionalis, a species of dendronotid nudibranch
