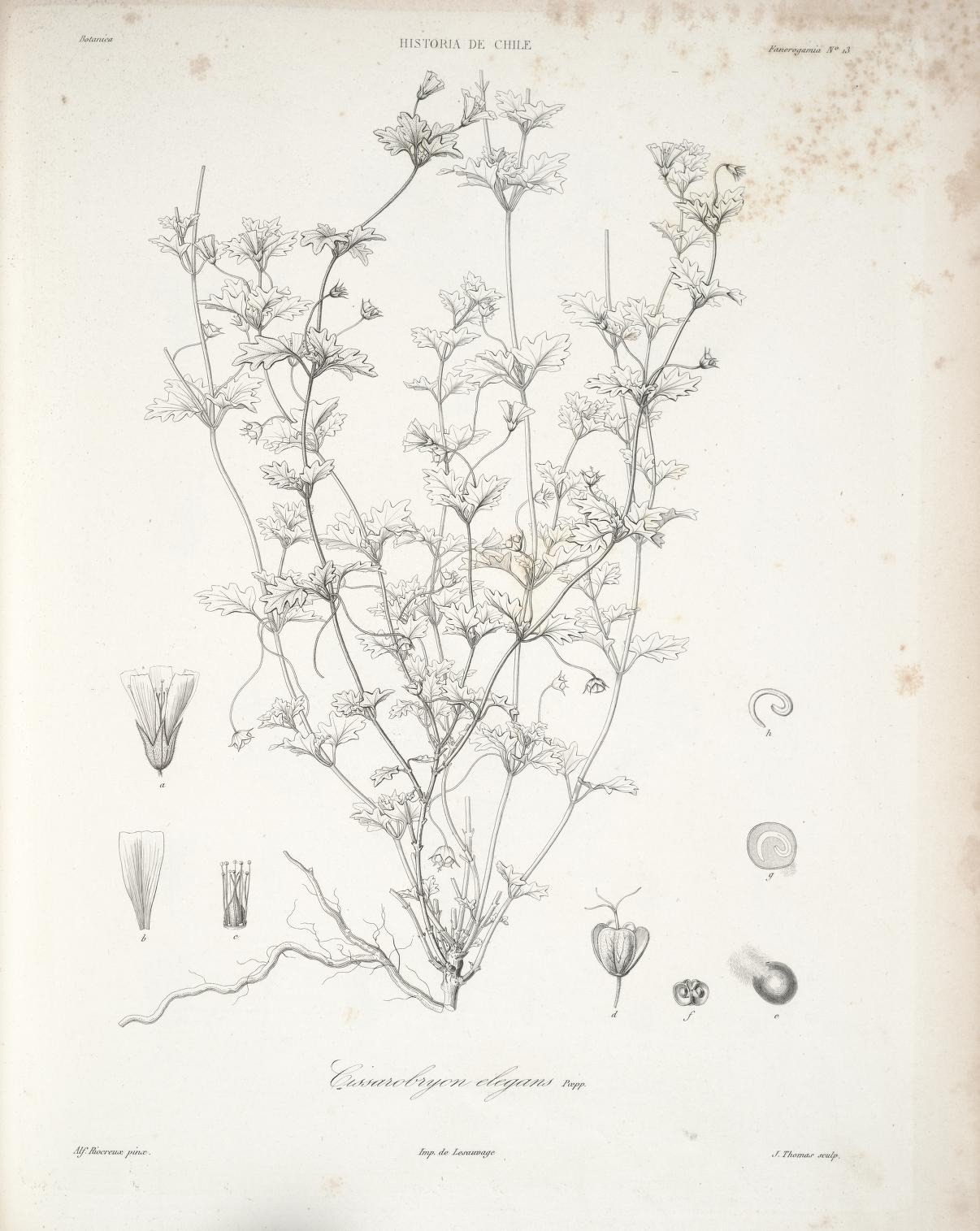

Scientific classification
- Kingdom: Plantae
- Clade: Tracheophytes
- Clade: Angiosperms
- Clade: Eudicots
- Clade: Rosids
- Order: Geraniales
- Family: Francoaceae
- Genus: Viviania
- Species: V. elegans

Binomial name
- Viviania elegans (Poepp.) Reiche & Johow (1896)

Synonyms
- Cissarobryon elegans Poepp.; Cissarobryon elegans (Poepp.) Kunze; Cissarobryon macrophyllum Phil.; Cissarobryon parvifolium Phil.; Viviania aristulata F.Meigen; Viviania aristulatum Phil.; Viviania macrophylla (Phil.) Reiche; Viviania microphylla Reiche & Johow

= Viviania elegans =

Species of plant

Viviania elegans is a flowering plant species in the family Francoaceae.
