= Natal bottlebrush =

Natal bottlebrush is a common name for several plants and may refer to:

- Greyia radlkoferi, native to South Africa
- Greyia sutherlandii, endemic to South Africa
