= Bridal wreath =

Bridal wreath or bridalwreath is a common name for several plants and may refer to:

- Francoa, especially:
  - Francoa sonchifolia, endemic to Chile
- Spiraea prunifolia, native to Japan, Korea, and China
- Tetilla hydrocotylefolia
