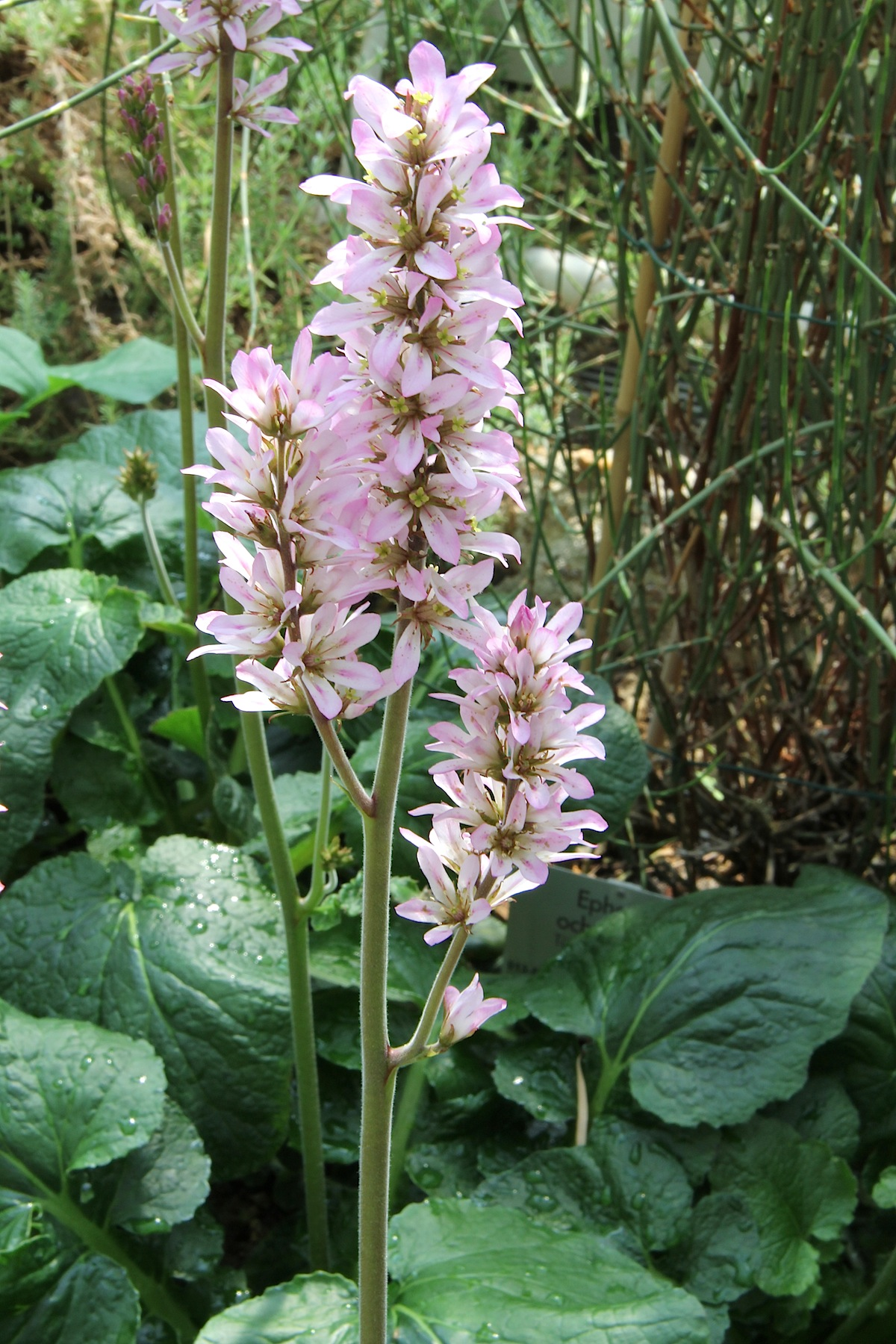
- Francoa appendiculata

Scientific classification
- Kingdom: Plantae
- Clade: Tracheophytes
- Clade: Angiosperms
- Clade: Eudicots
- Clade: Rosids
- Order: Geraniales
- Family: Francoaceae
- Genus: Francoa
- Species: F. appendiculata

Binomial name
- Francoa appendiculata A.Juss. ex Cav.

= Francoa appendiculata =

Species of plant

Francoa appendiculata is a species of herb in the Francoaceae family endemic to Chile.

According to Plants of the world online, this is the only species of the genus Francoa. The Catalogue of the vascular plants of Chile recognise the varieties Francoa appendiculata Cav. var. appendiculata, Francoa appendiculata Cav. var. ramosa (D. Don) Rolfe and Francoa appendiculata Cav. var. sonchifolia (Cav.) Rolfe.

Plants may grow up to one metre high and produce basal clumps of round, deeply lobed, dark green, fuzzy leaves with winged leafstalks. Compact racemes of small, cup-shaped flowers, which are pink with red markings, appear in summer and early fall.
