= Bersama swynnertonii =

Conservation status
- Least Concern (IUCN 3.1)

Scientific classification
- Kingdom: Plantae
- Clade: Tracheophytes
- Clade: Angiosperms
- Clade: Eudicots
- Clade: Rosids
- Order: Geraniales
- Family: Francoaceae
- Genus: Bersama
- Species: B. swynnertonii

Binomial name
- Bersama swynnertonii Baker f.

Species of flowering plant

Bersama swynnertonii is a species of plant in the Francoaceae family. It is a tree endemic to the Eastern Highlands in eastern Zimbabwe, along the border with Mozambique. It grows at the margins of moist montane forest and in gully forests from 1,000 to 1,680 metres elevation. There are subpopulations near the Chirinda Forest, in the Chimanimani Mountains, Bvumba Mountains, and in forest near Stapleford. Some subpopulations are in protected areas, including Chimanimani National Park and lands managed by the Zimbabwe Forestry Commission.
