= Cyperus canus =

Scientific classification
- Kingdom: Plantae
- Clade: Tracheophytes
- Clade: Angiosperms
- Clade: Monocots
- Clade: Commelinids
- Order: Poales
- Family: Cyperaceae
- Genus: Cyperus
- Species: C. canus

Binomial name
- Cyperus canus J.Presl & C.Presl

Species of sedge

Cyperus canus is a species of sedge that is native to parts of Mexico, Central America and northern South America.

The species was first formally described by the botanists Carl Borivoj Presl and Jan Svatopluk Presl in 1828.

== See also ==
- List of Cyperus species
