= Friedrich von Berchtold =

German-speaking Bohemian physician and botanist

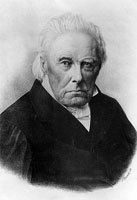
- Born: 25 October 1781; Stráž nad Nežárkou
- Died: 3 April 1876 (aged 94); Buchlovice
- Scientific career
- Fields: Botany, Medicine
- Author abbrev. (botany): Bercht.

Friedrich Graf von Berchtold, Freiherr von Ungarschitz (Czech: Bedřich Karel Eugen Všemír Berchtold hrabě z Uherčic; Hrabě is the Czech equivalent, the female form is hraběnka; 25 October 1781 – 3 April 1876) was a German-speaking Bohemian physician and botanist of Austrian descent.

== Biography ==
Berchtold was born in Stráž nad Nežárkou (German: Platz an der Naser) (now Jindřichův Hradec District), in the Austrian Empire. He graduated from medical school in 1804, after which he practiced medicine and devoted much of his time to botany and natural history. He eventually abandoned regular medical practice and travelled throughout Europe, the Middle East and Brazil. He co-authored several research papers with brother botanists Carl Borivoj Presl and Jan Svatopluk Presl, including an important taxonomic work, O Přirozenosti Rostlin.

An avid worker for Czech national revival, Berchtold was involved in the establishment of the Prague National Museum. He died in 1876 in Buchlau (now Buchlovice), Moravia (now part of the Czech Republic).

The genus Berchtoldia C.Presl (syn. Chaetium Nees) was named in his honor.

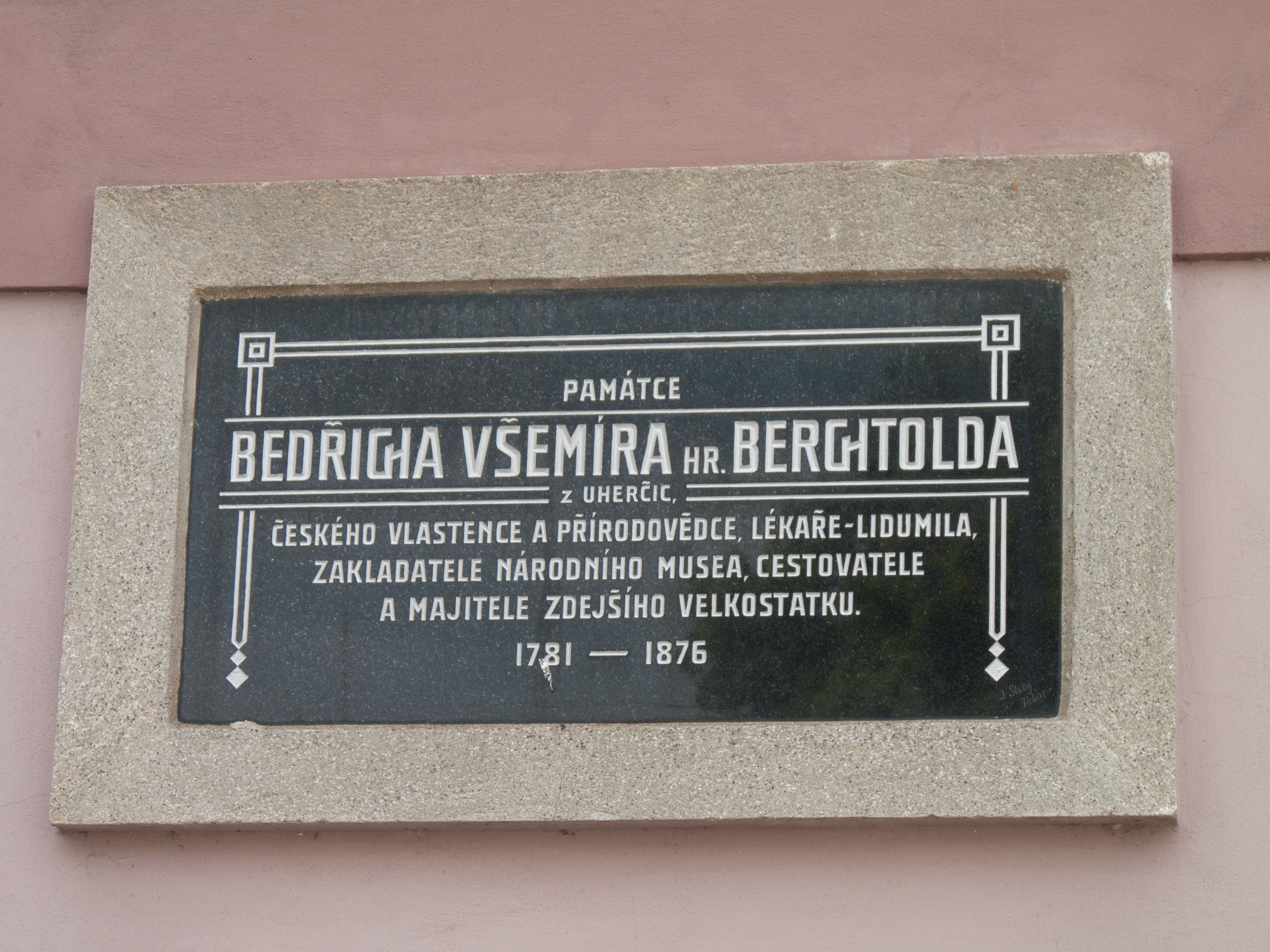
Plaque commemorating Berchtold at the municipal office building in the village of Tučapy (Tábor District), Czech Republic.

== Selected publications ==
- Berchtold, Friedrich von; Presl, Jan Svatopluk (1820). O Prirozenosti Rostlin. Prague: Krala Wiljma Endersa.
- Berchtold, Friedrich von; Presl, Jan Svatopluk (1820–1835). O Prirozenosti Rostlin aneb rostlinář. Prague: Jos Krause.

== See also ==
- Category:Taxa named by Friedrich von Berchtold

== Bibliography ==
- Heribert Sturm (1979). Biographisches Lexikon zur Geschichte der böhmischen Länder (in German). R.Oldenbourg. ISBN 3-486-49491-0.
- Stafleu, Frans A.; Cowan, Richard S. (1976–1988). Taxonomic literature: a selective guide to botanical publications and collections with dates, commentaries and types: Taxon. Lit., ed. 2 (TL2) (2nd ed.). Utrecht: Bohn, Scheltema & Holkema. ISBN 90-313-0224-4.
