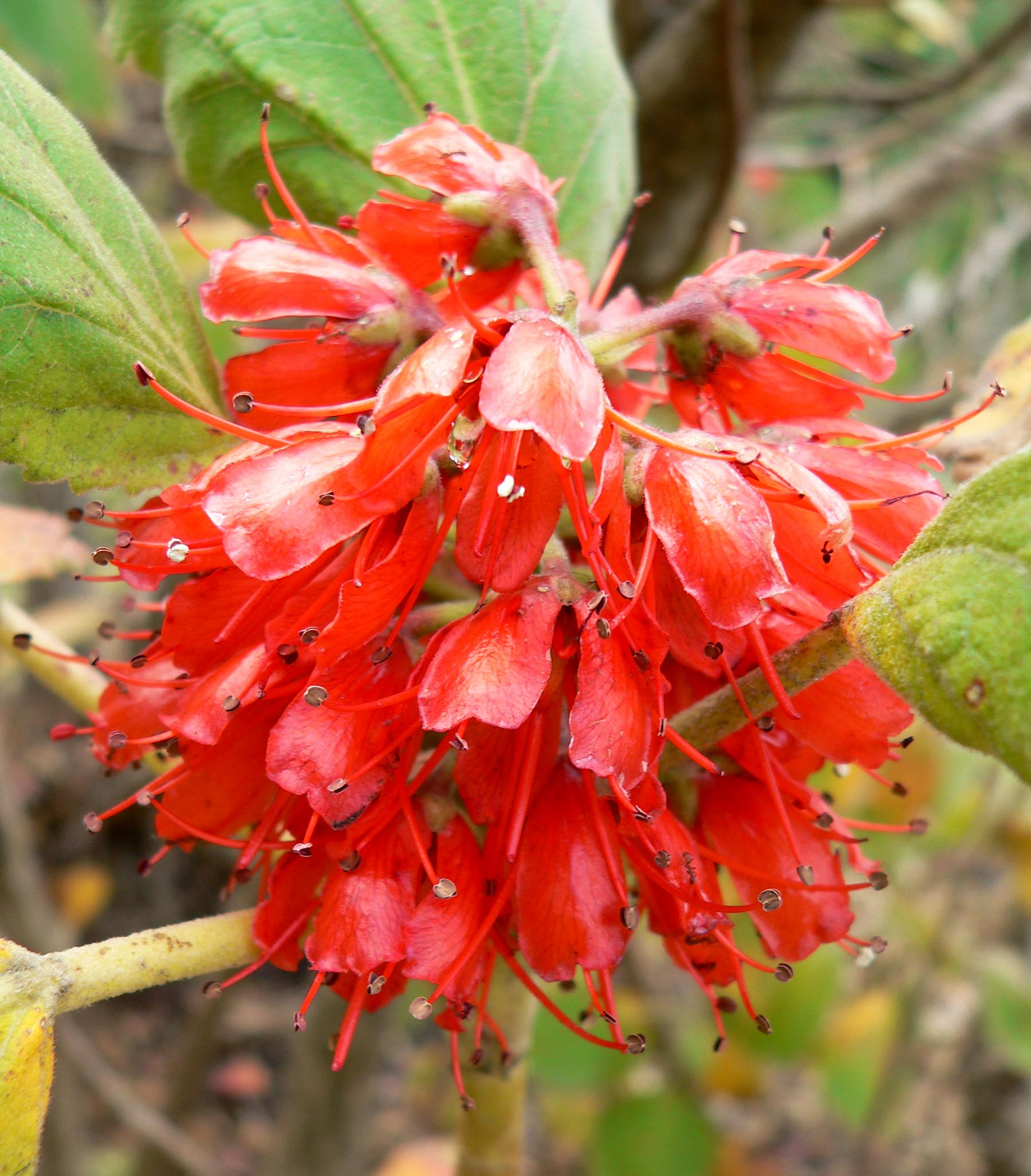

Scientific classification
- Kingdom: Plantae
- Clade: Tracheophytes
- Clade: Angiosperms
- Clade: Eudicots
- Clade: Rosids
- Order: Geraniales
- Family: Francoaceae
- Genus: Greyia
- Species: G. radlkoferi

Binomial name
- Greyia radlkoferi Szyszyl.

= Greyia radlkoferi =

Species of tree

Greyia radlkoferi, the woolly bottlebrush or Natal bottlebrush, is a shrub or small tree, native to South Africa. It grows up to 5 metres in height and has smooth yellowish bark, becoming grey and deeply furrowed as it matures. The leaves are oval or heart-shaped and woolly on the undersurface, which distinguishes the species from Greyia sutherlandii. The scarlet flowers occur in dense, upright clusters from July to October in the species' native range.

It is named for Ludwig Adolph Timotheus Radlkofer.
