= Cyperus sordidus =

Scientific classification
- Kingdom: Plantae
- Clade: Tracheophytes
- Clade: Angiosperms
- Clade: Monocots
- Clade: Commelinids
- Order: Poales
- Family: Cyperaceae
- Genus: Cyperus
- Species: C. sordidus

Binomial name
- Cyperus sordidus J.Presl & C.Presl

Species of sedge

Cyperus sordidus is a species of sedge that is native to parts of Mexico.

The species was first formally described by the botanists Carl Borivoj Presl and Jan Svatopluk Presl in 1828.

== See also ==
- List of Cyperus species
