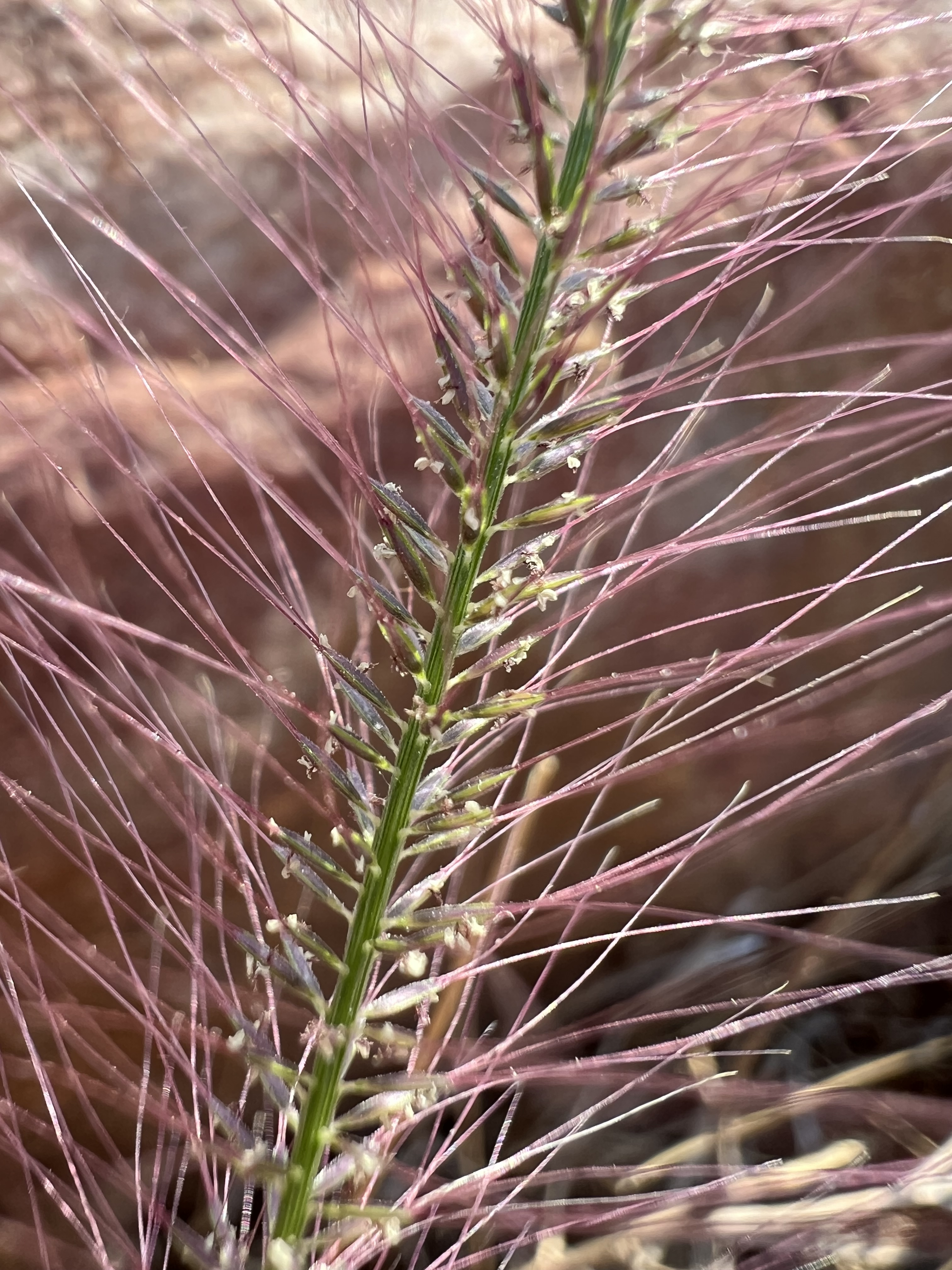
- Perotis indica (L.) Kuntze inflorescence closeup

Scientific classification
- Kingdom: Plantae
- Clade: Tracheophytes
- Clade: Angiosperms
- Clade: Monocots
- Clade: Commelinids
- Order: Poales
- Family: Poaceae
- Subfamily: Chloridoideae
- Tribe: Cynodonteae
- Subtribe: Perotidinae
- Genus: Perotis; Aiton

Type species
- Perotis latifolia (syn. of P. indica) Aiton

Synonyms
- Diplachyrium Nees; Holboellia Hook., nom. illeg.; Lopholepis Decne.; Toliara Judz.; Xystidium Trin.

= Perotis (plant) =

Genus of grasses

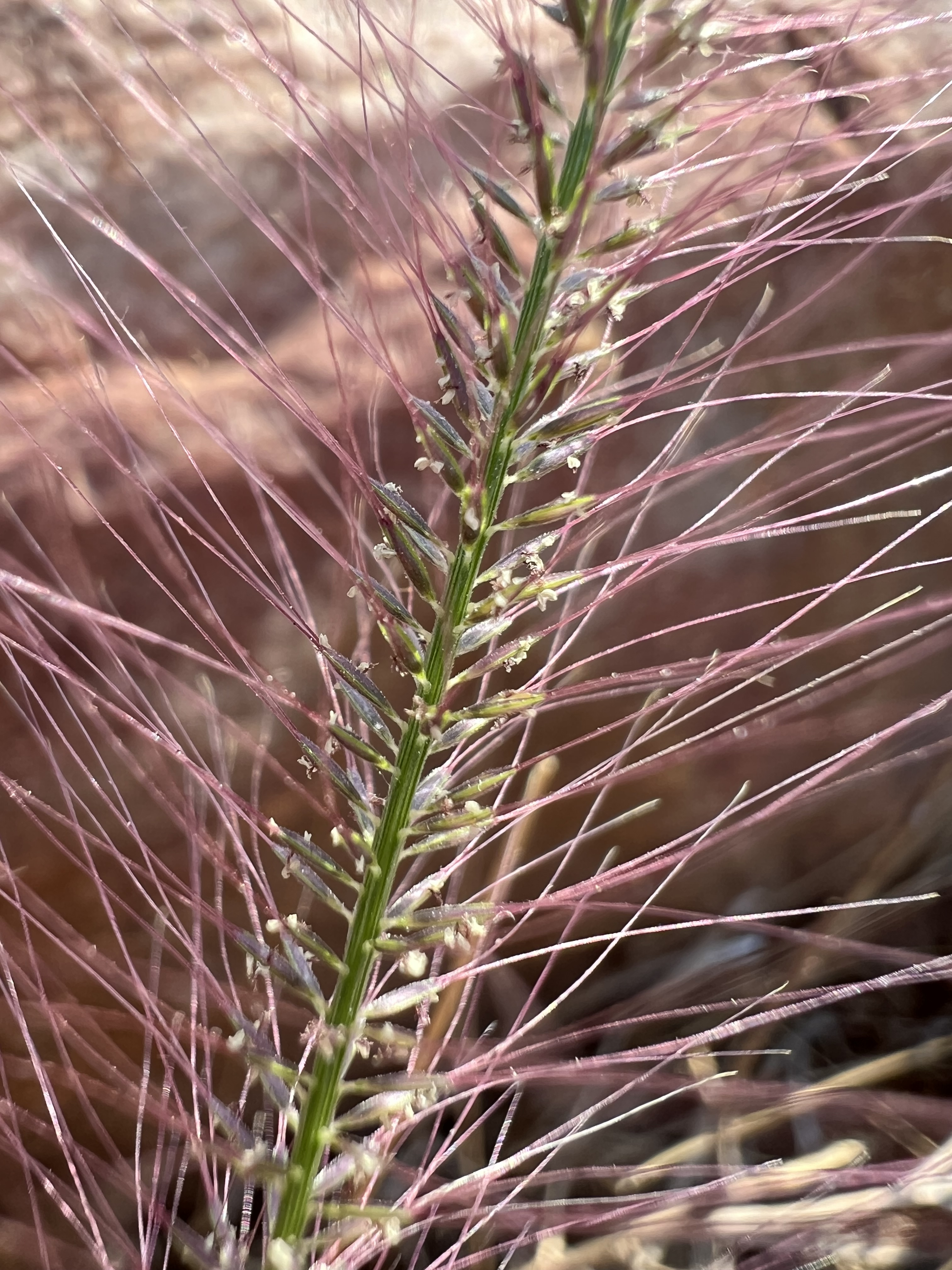
Perotis indica (L.) Kuntze inflorescence closeup.

Perotis is a genus of Asian, African, and Australian plants in the family Poaceae.

Species

- Perotis acanthoneuron Cope - Somalia
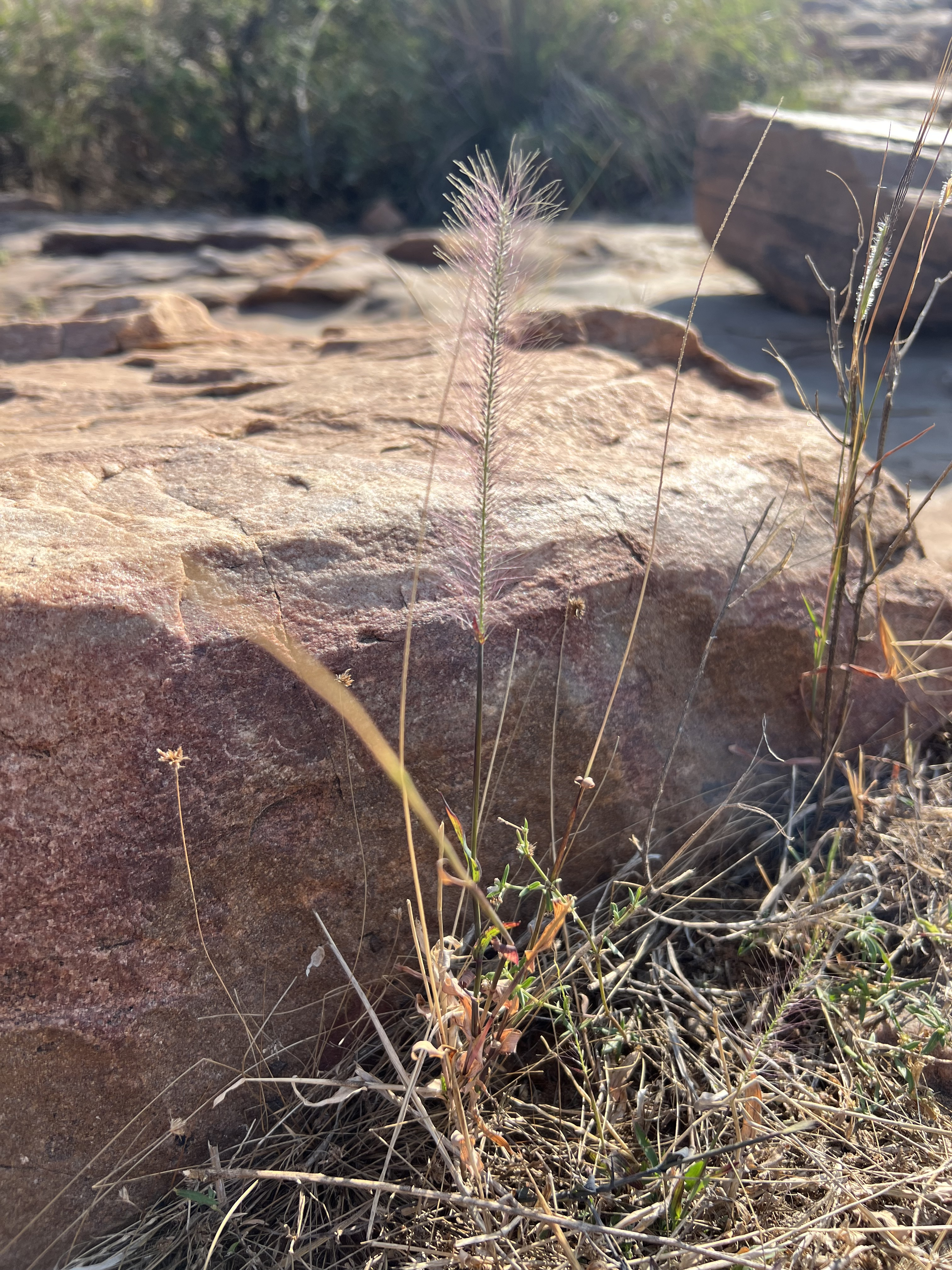
- Habit of Perotis indica (L.) Kuntze.
  Perotis arenacea (Judz.) P.M.Peterson - Madagascar
- Perotis clarksonii Veldkamp - Queensland
- Perotis flavinodula Mez - Tanzania
- Perotis hildebrandtii Mez - West Africa (Sierra Leone to Nigeria), East Africa (Ethiopia to Tanzania), Madagascar, Seychelles
- Perotis hordeiformis Nees ex Hook. & Arn. - China, Southeast Asia, Indian subcontinent, New Guinea
- Perotis humbertii A.Camus - Madagascar
- Perotis indica (L.) Kuntze - China, Southeast Asia, Indian subcontinent, New Guinea, Tropical Africa, Madagascar, Réunion
- Perotis leptopus Pilg. - from Tanzania to Namibia
- Perotis ornithocephala (Hook.) P.M.Peterson - India, Sri Lanka
- Perotis patens Gand. - Sub-Saharan Africa, Madagascar
- Perotis pilosa Cope - Kenya
- Perotis rara R.Br. - China, Southeast Asia, New Guinea, Australia
- Perotis scabra Willd. ex Trin. - Senegal, Gambia, Sierra Leone, Burkina Faso
- Perotis somalensis Chiov. - Somalia
- Perotis vaginata Hack. - from Burundi to Namibia

formerly included

see Chaetium Mosdenia Pennisetum Pogonatherum

- Perotis cubana - Chaetium cubanum
- Perotis latifolia Eckl. ex Steud. 1841 not Aiton 1789 - Pennisetum macrourum
- Perotis phleoides - Mosdenia leptostachys
- Perotis polystachya - Pogonatherum paniceum
