= Ledocarpaceae =

Family of flowering plants

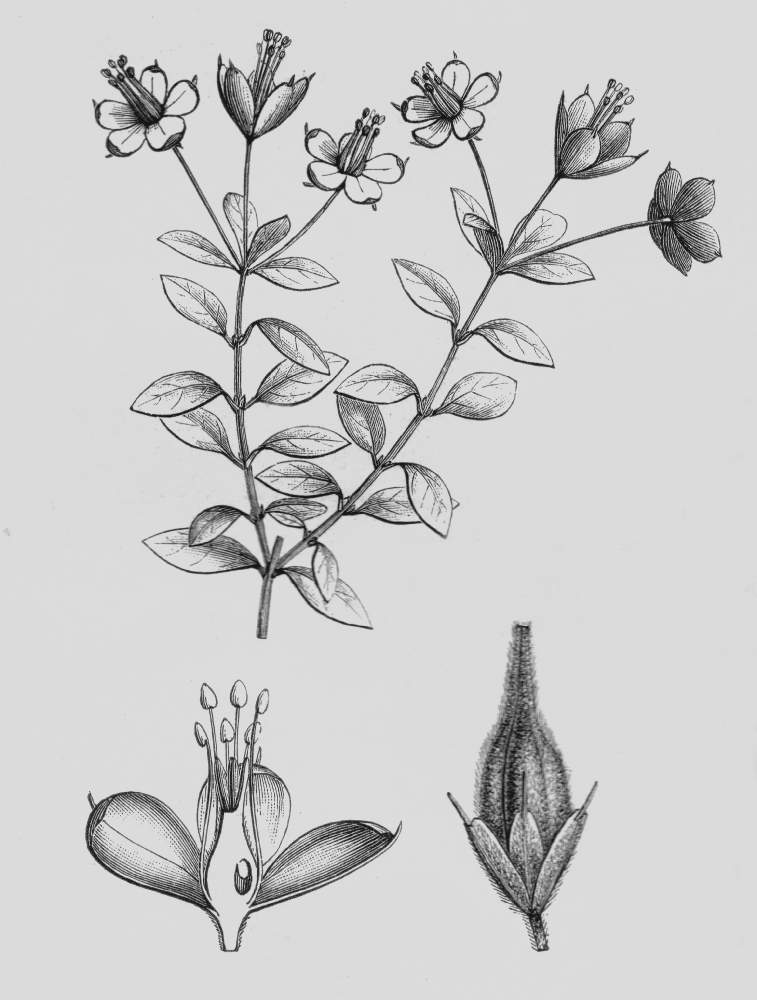
Rhynchotheca spinosa

Ledocarpaceae Meyen was a small flowering plant family of shrubs native to western South America. Under the APG IV system of classification it is considered to be a part of the Francoaceae.

== Classification ==
In the APG III (2009) phylogenetic classification, this family was invalid and its genera were incorporated into the family Vivianiaceae.

In the APG IV (2016) phylogenetic classification, the Ledocarpaceae and the Vivianiaceae are included in the Francoaceae.
