= Cyperus tenerrimus =

Scientific classification
- Kingdom: Plantae
- Clade: Tracheophytes
- Clade: Angiosperms
- Clade: Monocots
- Clade: Commelinids
- Order: Poales
- Family: Cyperaceae
- Genus: Cyperus
- Species: C. tenerrimus

Binomial name
- Cyperus tenerrimus J.Presl & C.Presl

Species of sedge

Cyperus tenerrimus is a species of sedge that is native to southern parts of North America, Central America and northern parts of South America.

The species was first formally described by the botanists Carl Borivoj Presl and Jan Svatopluk Presl in 1828.

== See also ==
- List of Cyperus species
