= Bridal crown =

Crown worn by a bride at her wedding

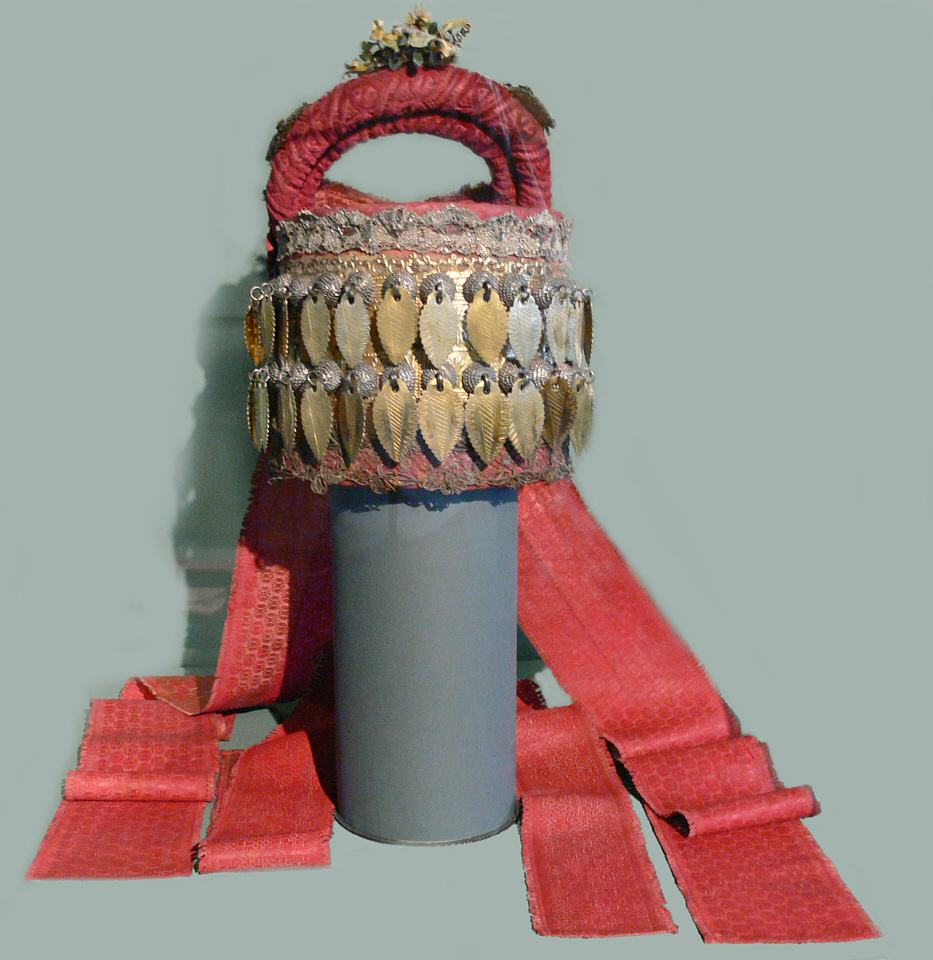
The Altenburger Hormt a 1624 bridal crown in the Museum of Thuringian Folk Art, Erfurt

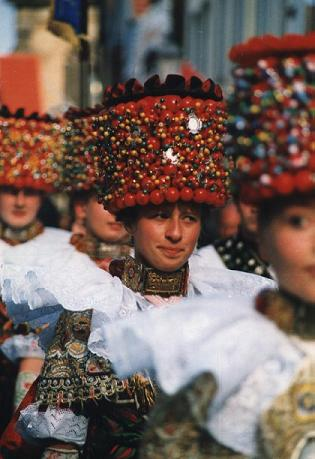
Lindhorst bridal procession. The women are wearing Kranzmaikes, Lower Saxony

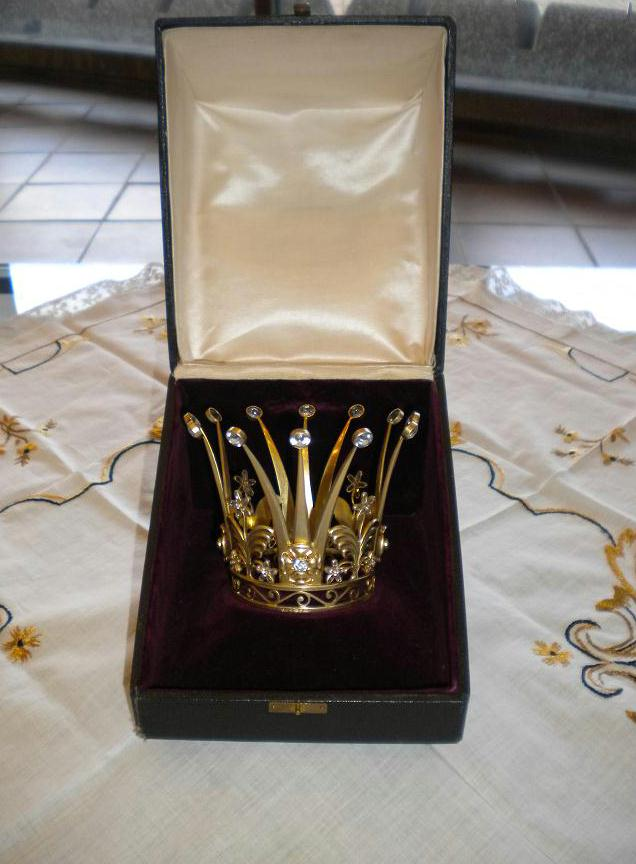
A Swedish bridal crown (coronet) from the 1930s in use through Täby Parish

Traditionally a bridal crown (German: Brautkrone or, in the Black Forest, Schäppel) is a headdress that, in Central and Northern Europe, single women wear on certain holidays, at festivals and, finally, at their wedding. Bridal crowns today, of another type, are also often provided by church parishes for the use of brides at their weddings.

== History ==
A bridal crown, along with the bridal wreath and veil, is probably the oldest decorative form of headdress worn by women. With it the bride would symbolise her purity, and it was also a status symbol for her family. Especially in farming areas, the bridal crown was and is very popular. In several regions the bride takes her crown off after the church service and hangs it over the wedding table as a sign of the peace.

The design of bridal crowns is very varied and depends on the place and region. To begin with they were decorated with flowers, fir branches, herbs and ripe fruits. In later times and even today, more expensive materials were used such as pearls, mirrors, silver and gold.

These more valuable headdresses could only be afforded by wealthy families. The less well off could, however, borrow them from neighbours and friends in return for payment in kind. Often the churches or parishes had bridal crowns and could hire them out. In the course of the 18th century, the bridal crown was replaced by the bridal wreath in many places, as had been the pagan custom in the 4th century.

When Princess Mary of Saxe-Altenburg married King George V of Hanover in 1843, he wore a large, golden crown and she a somewhat smaller golden bridal crown.

Such bridal crowns are traditionally worn together with a national or local costume (e.g. Tracht in Germany or Austria) or as a less expensive item in the shape of a small crown or a diadem.

== Regional variations ==
In Norway, Sweden and Serbia, bridal crowns were made of silver; in Bavaria and Silesia of gold wire, glass stones and glittering metal flakes.

In the Black Forest, bridal crowns also have pearls, glass balls, mirrors and ribbons or paper roses. Locally bridal crowns are always known as Schäppel, and they vary in design from place to place. An insight into the range of the Schäppel in the Black Forest is the collection at the Black Forest Costume Museum in Haslach.

The so-called Borta is worn by the Sorbs in Lusatia.

In Thuringia they wear a Hormt as part of the farming costume at Altenburg.

A wide range of bridal crowns are also seen in Hungary and Slovakia—many featuring artificial flowers and beads.

== Today ==
In Scandinavia bridal crowns today usually are made of brass, silver or gold, are fashioned like a smaller type of coronet of a princess and often have gems and ornate decorations. They are often attached to long veils. Scandinavian church parishes keep such crowns of their own and lend them to brides for their wedding ceremonies and receptions. The crown relates to the Virgin Mary, and is a statement of a young woman's purity and virginity at her wedding.

== Literature ==
- Hartmut Braun: Der Schäppel und sein kulturgeschichtlicher Ursprung, in: Forschungen und Berichte zur Volkskunde in Baden-Württemberg Vol. 1, Stuttgart 1973, pp. 165–171.
- Informationen zur Trachtenkunde der Fachgruppe Trachten und Brauchtumspflege des Deutschen Heimatbundes - Heft 1: Brautkronen(I), Bonn, 1997
