= Domenico Viviani =

Italian botanist (1772–1840)

Domenico Viviani (29 July 1772, Levanto, Liguria – 15 February 1840, Genoa) was an Italian botanist and naturalist.

In 1803, he was named professor of botany at the University of Genoa, where he is credited with the founding of its botanical garden. He is known for his natural history studies (botany, mineralogy, zoology) of the Ligurian region as well as botanical investigations of flora native to other areas of the Italian mainland, Sardinia, Corsica, and Libya.

In 1804, Antonio José Cavanilles named the botanical genus Viviania (of family Vivianiaceae, from southern South America) in his honor. He bequeathed his library of 2000 volumes from the 16th to the 19th century to King Charles Albert of Sardinia, who in turn donated the books to the University of Genoa library. His herbarium in Genoa was destroyed due to the ravages of war, however, some of his specimens can be located in other herbaria.

== Published works ==
- "Annales Botanici", 1804.
- Memoria sopra una nuova specie di minerale scoperta in Liguria - Treatise on a new mineral discovered in Liguria.
- Catalogue des poissons de la rivière de Gênes et du Golfe de la Spezzia, 1806 - Catalogue of the fishes of the coasts of the Gulf of Genoa and La Spezia.
- Voyage dans les Apennins de la ci-devant Ligurie pour servir d'introduction à l'Histoire Naturelle de ce pays, 1807 - Travel in the Apennines of Liguria to serve as an introduction to the natural history of this region.
- "Florae Italicae fragmenta, seu Plantae rariores, vel nondum cognitae, in variis Italiae regionibus detectae, descriptionibus, et figuris llustratae", 1808.
- "Florae Libycae specimen: sive, plantarum enumeratio Cyrenaicam, Pentapolim, Magnae Syrteos Desertum Et Regionem Tripolitanam Incolentium...", 1824.
- "Flore Corsicae specierum novarum vel minus cognitarum diagnosis quam in Florae Italicae fragmentis alternis Prodromum exhibet", 1825.
- I funghi d'Italia, 1834 - A treatise on Italian mycology.
