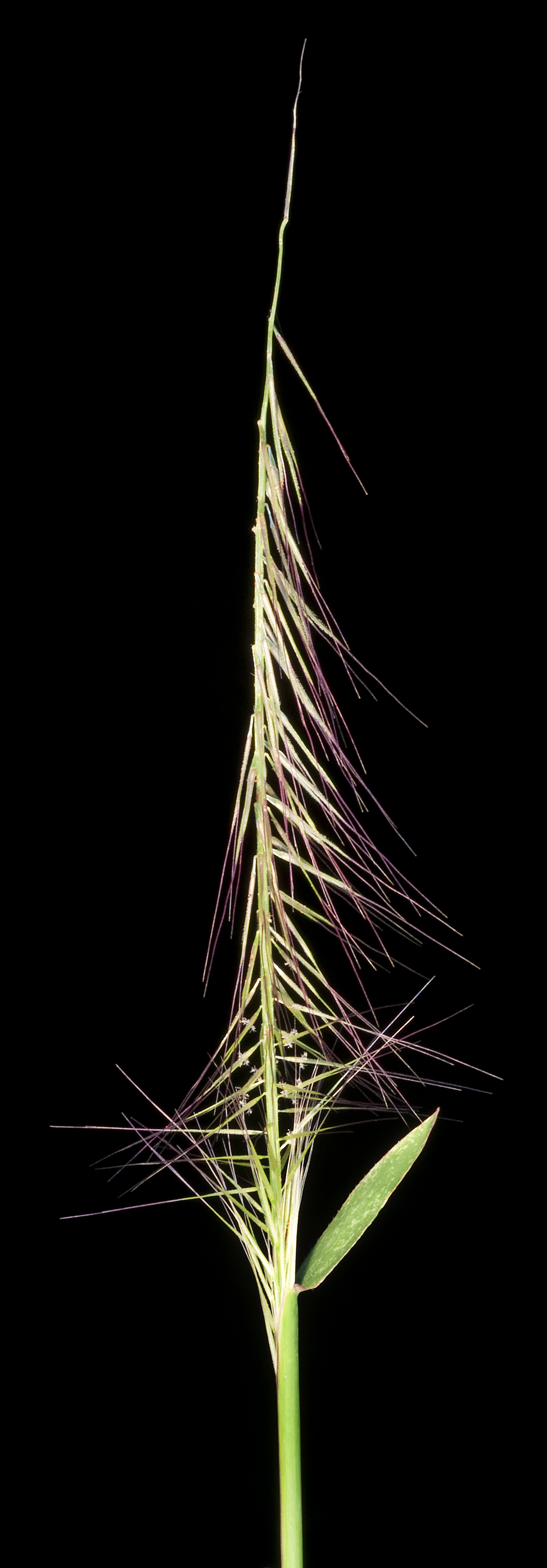

Scientific classification
- Kingdom: Plantae
- Clade: Tracheophytes
- Clade: Angiosperms
- Clade: Monocots
- Clade: Commelinids
- Order: Poales
- Family: Poaceae
- Subfamily: Chloridoideae
- Genus: Perotis
- Species: P. rara

Binomial name
- Perotis rara R.Br.

Synonyms
- Diplachyrium rarum (R.Br.) Nees; Perotis longiflora Nees; Perotis longiflora Nees ex Hook. & Arn. Perotis macrantha Honda; Perotis rara subsp. euryphylla Perotis rara var. euryphylla Domin; Saccharum rarum (R.Br.) Poir. Xystidium maritimum Trin.

= Perotis rara =

Species of grass

Perotis rara is a species of grass in the family, Poaceae, first described by Robert Brown in 1810. It is native to Australia, South-east China, Malaya, New Guinea, the Philippines, Taiwan, Thailand, and Vietnam.
