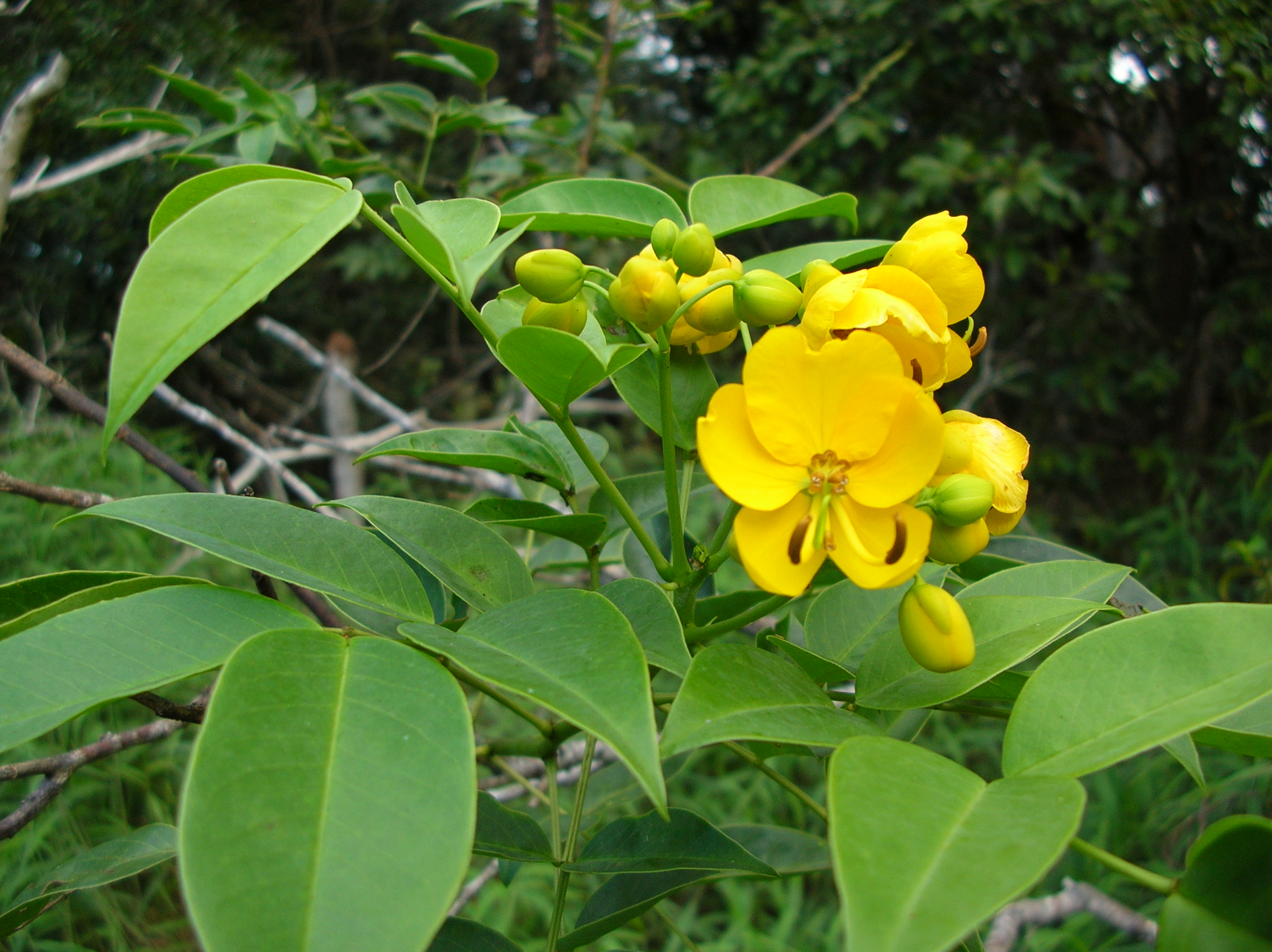
- In Makawao Forest Reserve

Scientific classification
- Kingdom: Plantae
- Clade: Tracheophytes
- Clade: Angiosperms
- Clade: Eudicots
- Clade: Rosids
- Order: Fabales
- Family: Fabaceae
- Subfamily: Caesalpinioideae
- Genus: Senna
- Species: S. septemtrionalis

Binomial name
- Senna septemtrionalis (Viv.) H.S.Irwin & Barneby

Synonyms
- List: Cassia septemtrionalis Viv.; Adipera laevigata (Willd.) Britton & Rose; Cassia aurata (Roxb.) Vogel; Cassia coymbosa Ortega; Cassia elegans Kunth; Cassia × floribunda var. pubescens V.Singh; Cassia grandiflora Desf.; Cassia laevigata Willd.; Cassia quadrangularis Zoll. & Moritzi; Cassia septentrionalis Zuccagni; Cassia septentrionalis Sessé & Moc. nom. illeg.; Cassia vernicosa Clos; Chamaecassia grandiflora Link; Chamaecassia laevigata (Willd.) Link; Chamaefistula elegans (Kunth) G.Don; Chamaefistula laevigata (Willd.) G.Don; Chamaesenna laevigata (Willd.) Pittier; Senna aurata Roxb.; Senna × floribunda var. pubescens (V.Singh) V.Singh; Senna septemtrionalis var. pubescens (V.Singh) V.Singh

= Senna septemtrionalis =

Species of legume

Senna septemtrionalis, commonly known as arsenic bush, is a species of flowering plant in the family Fabaceae and is native to Central America, the southern United States and Mexico, but is naturalised in many other countries. It is an erect shrub with pinnate leaves, with four or five pairs of egg-shaped leaflets, and yellow flowers arranged in groups of five to eight, usually with seven fertile stamens and four staminodes in each flower.

== Description ==
Senna septemtrionalis is an erect, glabrous shrub that typically grows to a height of up to 3 m (9.8 ft). Its leaves are pinnate, 60–80 mm (2.4–3.1 in) long including a petiole 15–30 mm (0.59–1.18 in) long, with four or five pairs of egg-shaped leaflets. The leaflets are 45–70 mm (1.8–2.8 in) long and 15–28 mm (0.59–1.10 in) wide, usually spaced 15–30 mm (0.59–1.18 in) apart. There are three or four erect, club-shaped glands between the lowest pairs of leaflets. The flowers are yellow and arranged on the ends of branches and in upper leaf axils in groups of five to eight on a peduncle 30–40 mm (1.2–1.6 in) long, each flower on a pedicel 10–13 mm (0.39–0.51 in) long. The petals are up to 8 mm (0.31 in) long and there are usually seven fertile stamens, the anthers 4–6 mm (0.16–0.24 in) long and of different lengths, as well as four staminodes. Flowering occurs from April to September in the Southern Hemisphere, and the fruit is a cylindrical pod 50–80 mm (2.0–3.1 in) long and 10–15 mm (0.39–0.59 in) wide.

== Taxonomy and naming ==
This species was first formally described in 1802 by Domenico Viviani who gave it the name Cassia septemtrionalis in Elenchus Plantarum Horti Botanici J. Car. Dinegro Observationibus quod Novas, vel Rariores Species Passim Interjectis. In 1982, Howard Samuel Irwin and Rupert Charles Barneby transferred the species to the genus Senna as S. septemtrionalis in the Memoirs of the New York Botanical Garden. The specific epithet (septemtrionalis) means "north" or "northern".

== Distribution and habitat ==
Senna septemtrionalis is native to the southern United States, Mexico and central America, but is introduced to many other countries, including to Queensland and New South Wales in Australia, and its offshore islands, Lord Howe and Norfolk Islands. In Australia it is found in pastures and disturbed rainforest.
