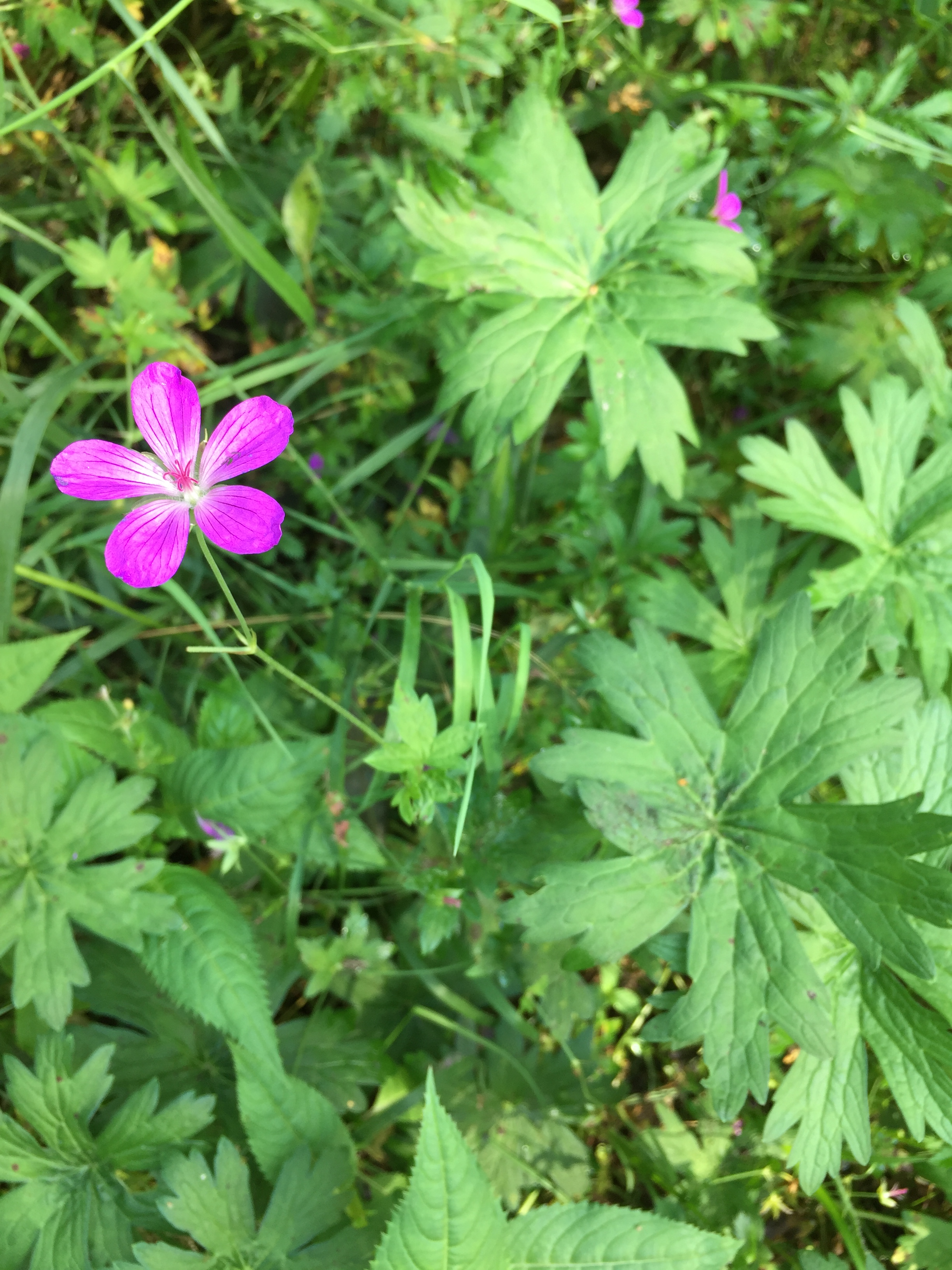

Scientific classification
- Kingdom: Plantae
- Clade: Tracheophytes
- Clade: Angiosperms
- Clade: Eudicots
- Clade: Rosids
- Order: Geraniales
- Family: Geraniaceae
- Genus: Geranium
- Species: G. palustre

Binomial name
- Geranium palustre L.

= Geranium palustre =

Species of flowering plant

Geranium palustre is a perennial species of flowering plant belonging to the family Geraniaceae.

Its native range is Europe to Southwestern Siberia and Caucasus.

The plant has leaves that are divided into 5-7 lobes, and large (3 cm in diameter) bright magenta flowers with a white centre and 5 veined petals.
