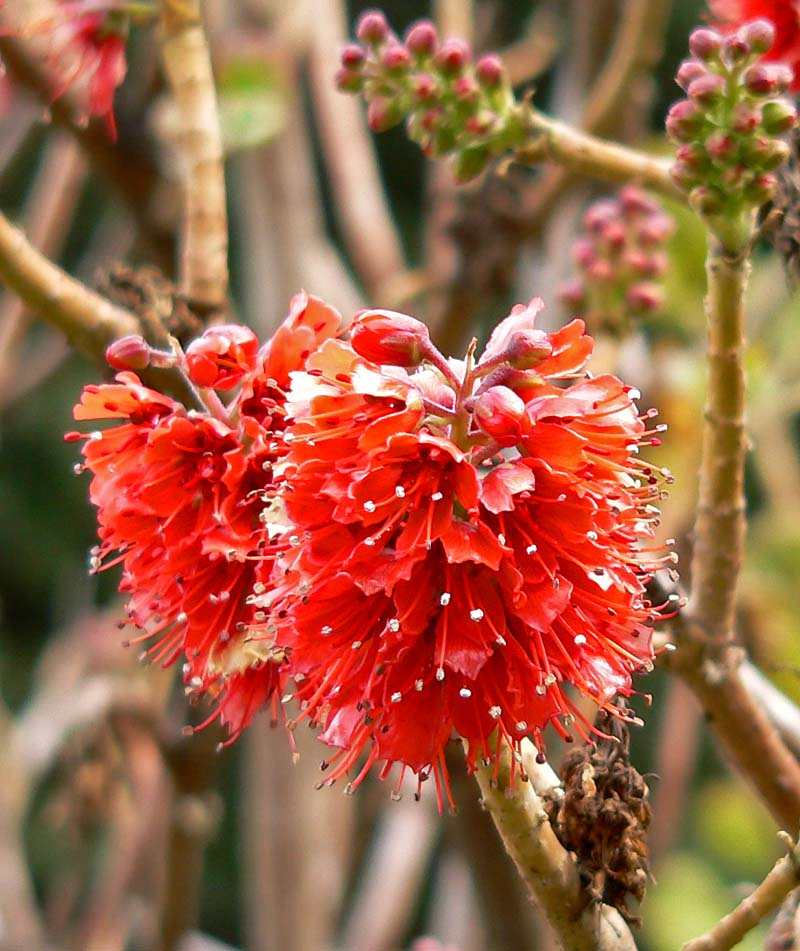
- Greyia radlkoferi

Scientific classification
- Kingdom: Plantae
- Clade: Tracheophytes
- Clade: Angiosperms
- Clade: Eudicots
- Clade: Rosids
- Order: Geraniales
- Family: Francoaceae
- Genus: Greyia; Hook. & Harv.

Species
- Greyia flanaganii; Greyia radlkoferi; Greyia sutherlandii

= Greyia =

Genus of flowering plants

Greyia is a genus of plant in family Francoaceae.

It contains three species native to South Africa, Eswatini, and Lesotho:

- Greyia flanaganii Bolus
- Greyia radlkoferi Szyszył.
- Greyia sutherlandii Hook. & Harv.

Unlike other plants sometimes included in the family Melianthaceae, Greyia has simple (undivided) leaves, flowers with ten stamens, and ovaries with parietal placentation. Because of this, the genus has sometimes been placed in a separate family Greyiaceae, but under the APG II system and APG III system of classification, it was included in the Melianthaceae. Under the APG IV system, it is included in the Francoaceae.
