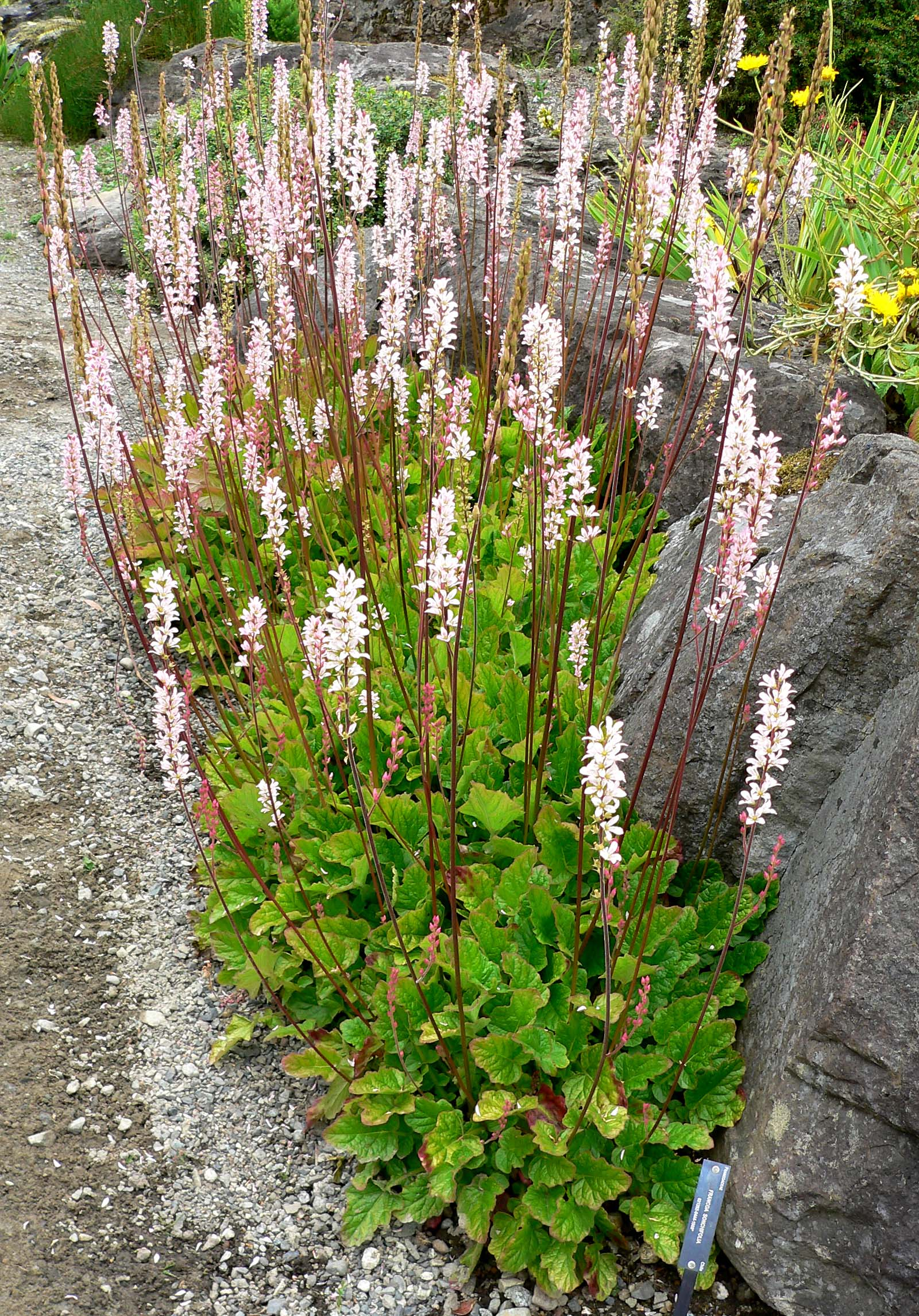

Scientific classification
- Kingdom: Plantae
- Clade: Tracheophytes
- Clade: Angiosperms
- Clade: Eudicots
- Clade: Rosids
- Order: Geraniales
- Family: Francoaceae
- Genus: Francoa
- Species: F. sonchifolia

Binomial name
- Francoa sonchifolia (Willd.) Cav.

= Francoa sonchifolia =

Species of plant

Francoa sonchifolia, the wedding flower or bridalwreath (bridal wreath), is a plant species in the family Francoaceae, that is endemic to Chile. An evergreen perennial with wavy edged basal leaves (sinuate), it produces erect unbranched racemes of pale pink flowers, veined or blotched with dark pink.

The Latin specific epithet sonchifolia means "with leaves like Sonchus (sowthistle)".

In cultivation it is hardy in mild places that do not suffer prolonged frozen ground (RHS H4).

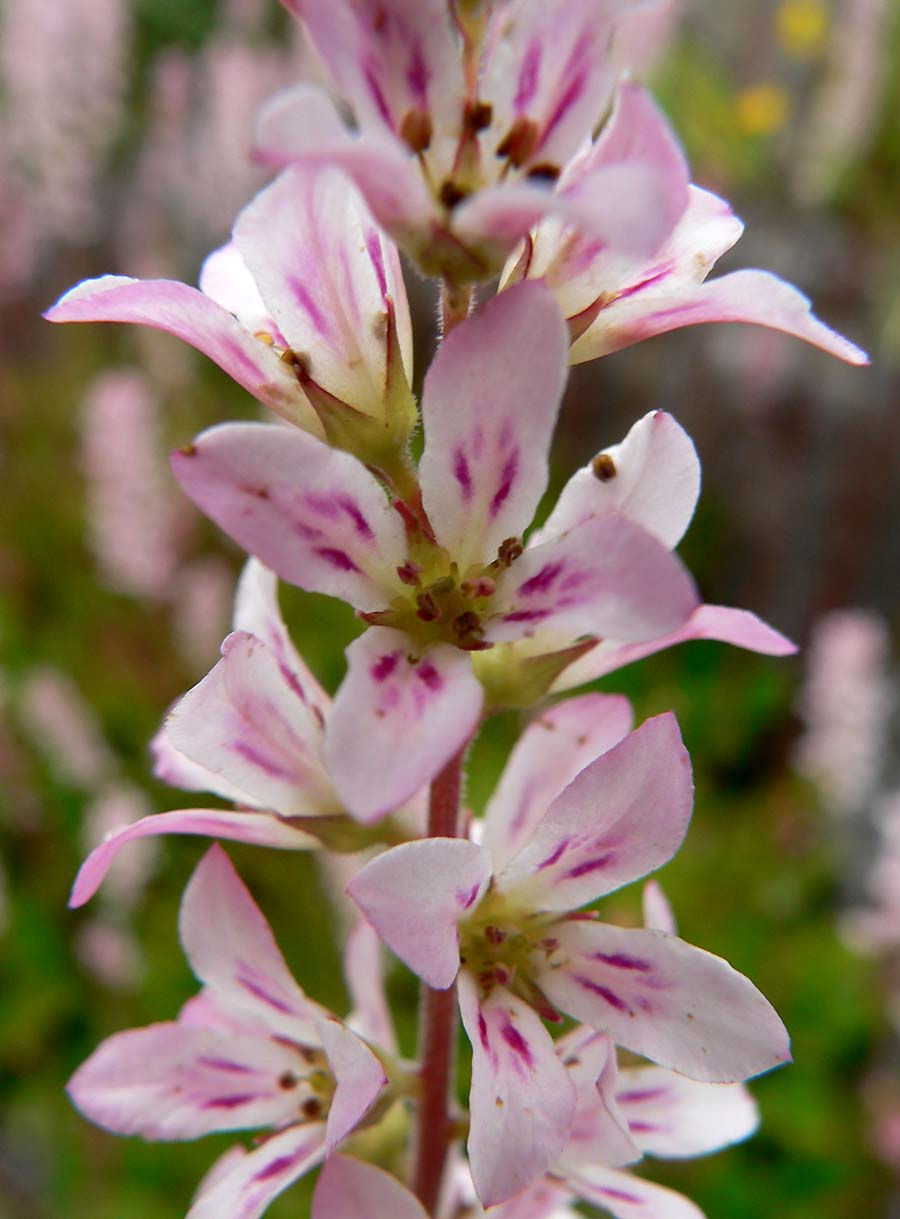

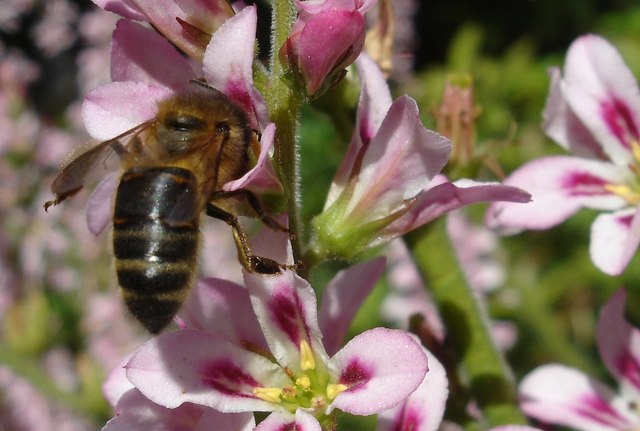
Honey bee on F. sonchifolia
