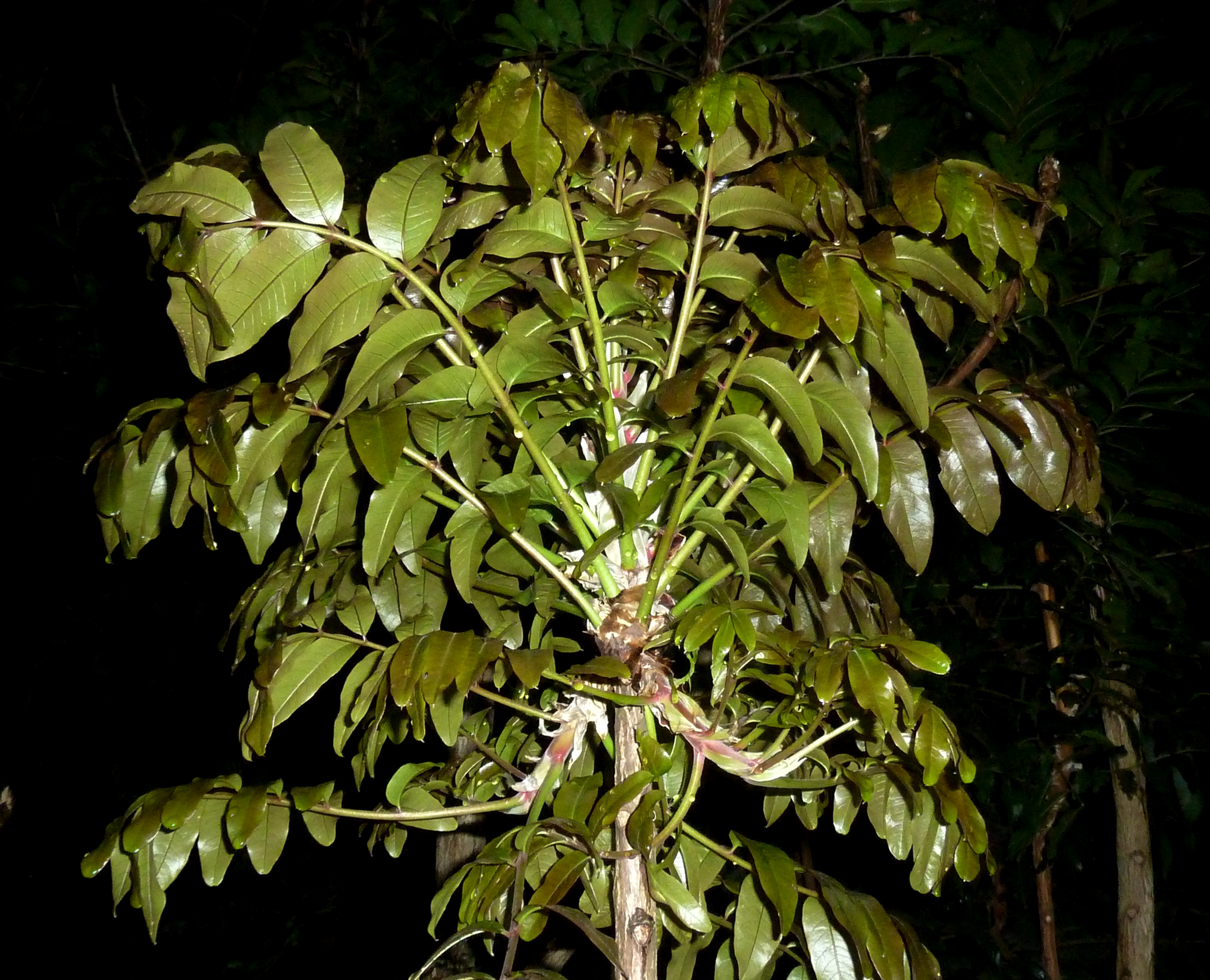
- Bersama lucens

Scientific classification
- Kingdom: Plantae
- Clade: Tracheophytes
- Clade: Angiosperms
- Clade: Eudicots
- Clade: Rosids
- Order: Geraniales
- Family: Francoaceae
- Genus: Bersama; Fres., 1837

Species
- See text

= Bersama =

Genus of flowering plants

Bersama is a genus of small trees in family Francoaceae. The genus is restricted to sub-Saharan Africa, but is distributed over much of the continent.

== Species ==
Plants of the World Online recognize the following as accepted species within the genus:

- Bersama abyssinica Fresen.
- Bersama lucens (Hochst.) Szyszył.
- Bersama palustris L.Touss.
- Bersama swinnyi Phillips
- Bersama swynnertonii Baker f.
- Bersama tysoniana Oliv.
- Bersama yangambiensis L.Touss.
