= Perotis ornithocephala =

Scientific classification
- Kingdom: Plantae
- Clade: Tracheophytes
- Clade: Angiosperms
- Clade: Monocots
- Clade: Commelinids
- Order: Poales
- Family: Poaceae
- Subfamily: Chloridoideae
- Genus: Perotis
- Species: P. ornithocephala

Binomial name
- Perotis ornithocephala (Hook.) P.M.Peterson

Synonyms
- Holboellia ornithocephala Hook.; Lopholepis ornithocephala (Hook.) Steud.

Genus of grasses

Perotis ornithocephala is a species of flowering plant in the grass family Poaceae, native to India and Sri Lanka. When placed in the monotypic genus Lopholepis as Lopholepis ornithocephala, it was the only species.

== Taxonomy ==
The species was first described by William Jackson Hooker in 1831 as Holboellia ornithocephala. It was transferred to the monotypic genus Lopholepis in 1854, where it was the only species. In 2014, it was transferred to the genus Perotis, the placement accepted by Plants of the World Online as of November 2024.
