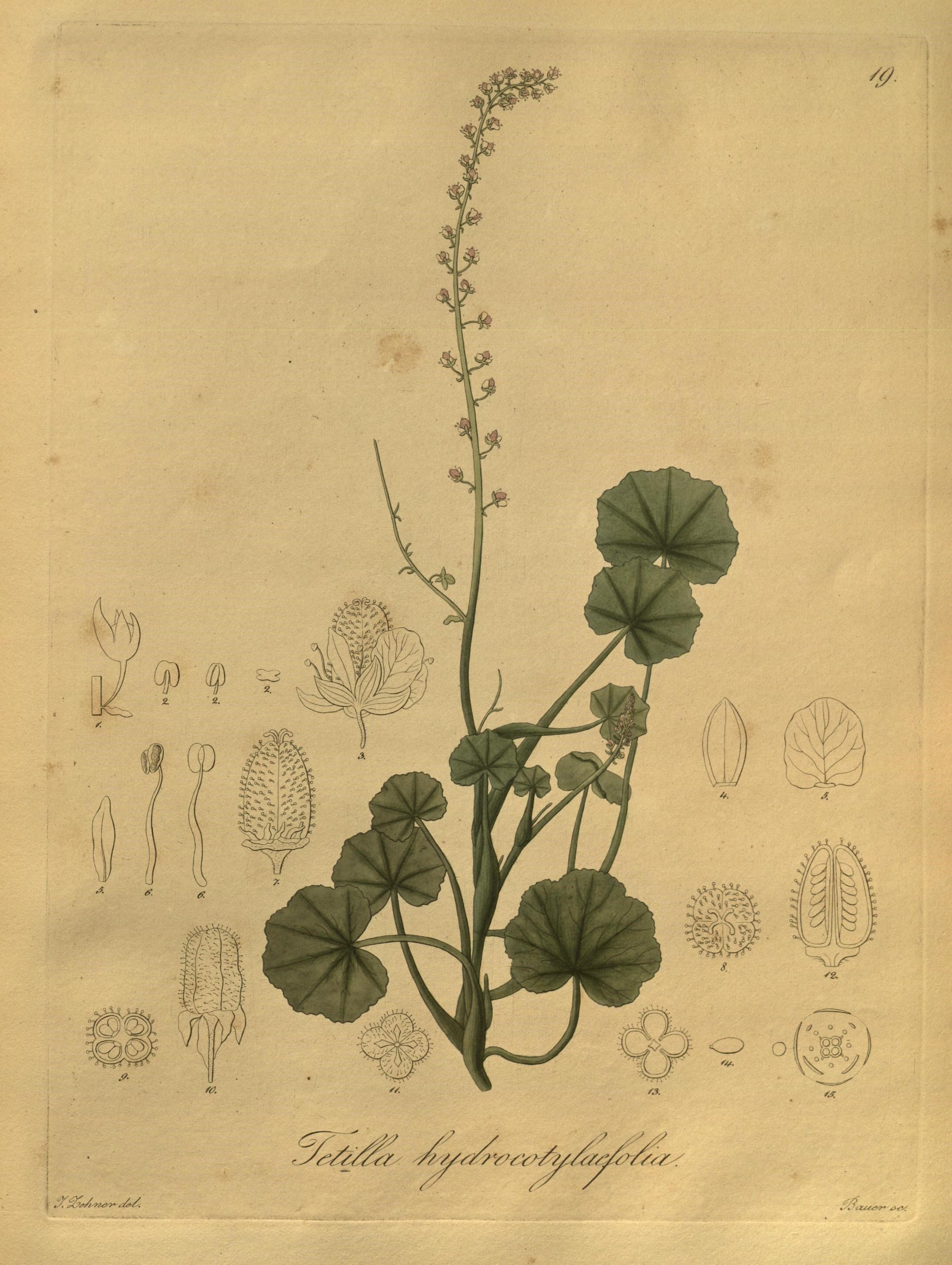

Scientific classification
- Kingdom: Plantae
- Clade: Tracheophytes
- Clade: Angiosperms
- Clade: Eudicots
- Clade: Rosids
- Order: Geraniales
- Family: Francoaceae
- Genus: Dimorphopetalum; Bertero
- Species: D. tetilla

Binomial name
- Dimorphopetalum tetilla Bertero

Synonyms
- Of the genus: Anarmosa Miers ex Hook.; Tetilla DC.; Tetraplasium Kunze; Of the species: Anarmosa gracilis Miers ex Hook.; Tetilla hydrocotylifolia DC.; Tetraplasium petiolare Kunze ex Walp.

= Dimorphopetalum =

Species of plant

Dimorphopetalum is a genus of flowering plants in the family Francoaceae.

It is a monotypic genus, containing only one species, Dimorphopetalum tetilla. It is a perennial endemic to central Chile.
