= O Přirozenosti Rostlin =

1820 botanical text

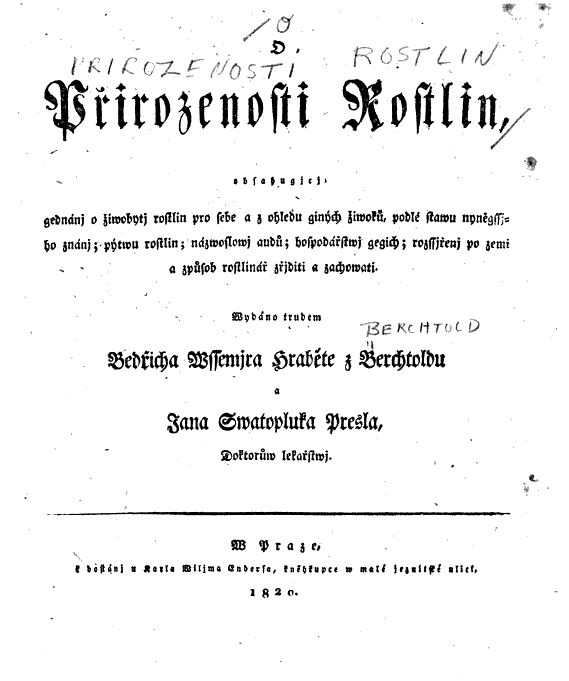
- Title page 1820
- Author: Friedrich von Berchtold & Jan Svatopluk Presl
- Language: Czech
- Subject: Botanical classification
- Genre: Science, biology
- Published: 1820, 1821–1835
- Publication place: Bohemia
- Media type: Print

O přirozenosti rostlin (On the Nature of Plants) is a Czech botanical text written by Friedrich von Berchtold and Jan Svatopluk Presl, and published in Prague in 1820. A later expanded edition in three volumes was published between 1821 and 1835. The full title of the 1820 work is O přirozenosti rostlin, obsahugjcj gednánj o žiwobytj rostlin pro sebe a z ohledu giných žiwoků, podlé stawu nyněgssího znanj, pýtwu rostlin; názwoslowj audů; hospodářstwj gegich; rozssjřenj po zemi a způsob rostlinář zřjditi a zachowati (Praha: 1820) but is generally referred to as O přirozenosti rostlin, and the standardised abbreviations is Prir. Rostlin.

The later edition is O přirozenosti rostlin aneb Rostlinář, obsahugjcj popsánj a wyobrazenj rostlin podlé řádů přirozených zpořádané, s zewrubným wyznamenánjm wlastnostj, užitečnosti a škodliwosti, obzwlástě wywodin a zplodin, spůsobu wydobýwánj, poslednjch dobroty a porušenosti neygistěgšjho poznánj a zkaušenj, též spůsobu užitecných sázenj chowánj a rozmnožwánj. Ustanowený pro lékaře, hogiče, hospodáře, umělce, řemeslnjky a wychowatele (Praha: 1821- 1835, 2 vols.) and is referred to as O Přrozenosti rostlin aneb Rostlinář, and the standardised abbreviations is Prir. Rostlin Aneb. Rostl..

== Publication details ==
1. O přirozenosti rostlin (1820)
2. O přirozenosti rostlin aneb Rostlinář (1821–1835)
  - Volume 1, 1820
    Volume 2, 1821–1825
    Volume 3, 1830–1835

== Bibliography ==
- Berchtold, Friedrich von; Presl, Jan Svatopluk (1820). O Přirozenosti Rostlin. Prague.
- Berchtold, Friedrich von; Presl, Jan Svatopluk (1820–1835). O Přirozenosti Rostlin aneb rostlinář. Prague: Jos Krause.
- "Tropicos". Missouri Botanical Garden. 2015.
- IPNI (2015). "The International Plant Names Index".
- Reveal, James (21 Apr 2000). "A Rare Botanical Book". University of Maryland.
- "Berchtold and Presl (1823–1835)". Persons, Collections and Topics. Hunt Institute for Botanical Documentation, Carnegie Mellon University. 2016.
- Stafleu, Frans A.; Cowan, Richard S. (1976–1988). Taxonomic literature: a selective guide to botanical publications and collections with dates, commentaries and types: Taxon. Lit., ed. 2 (TL2) (2nd ed.). Utrecht: Bohn, Scheltema & Holkema. ISBN 90-313-0224-4.
