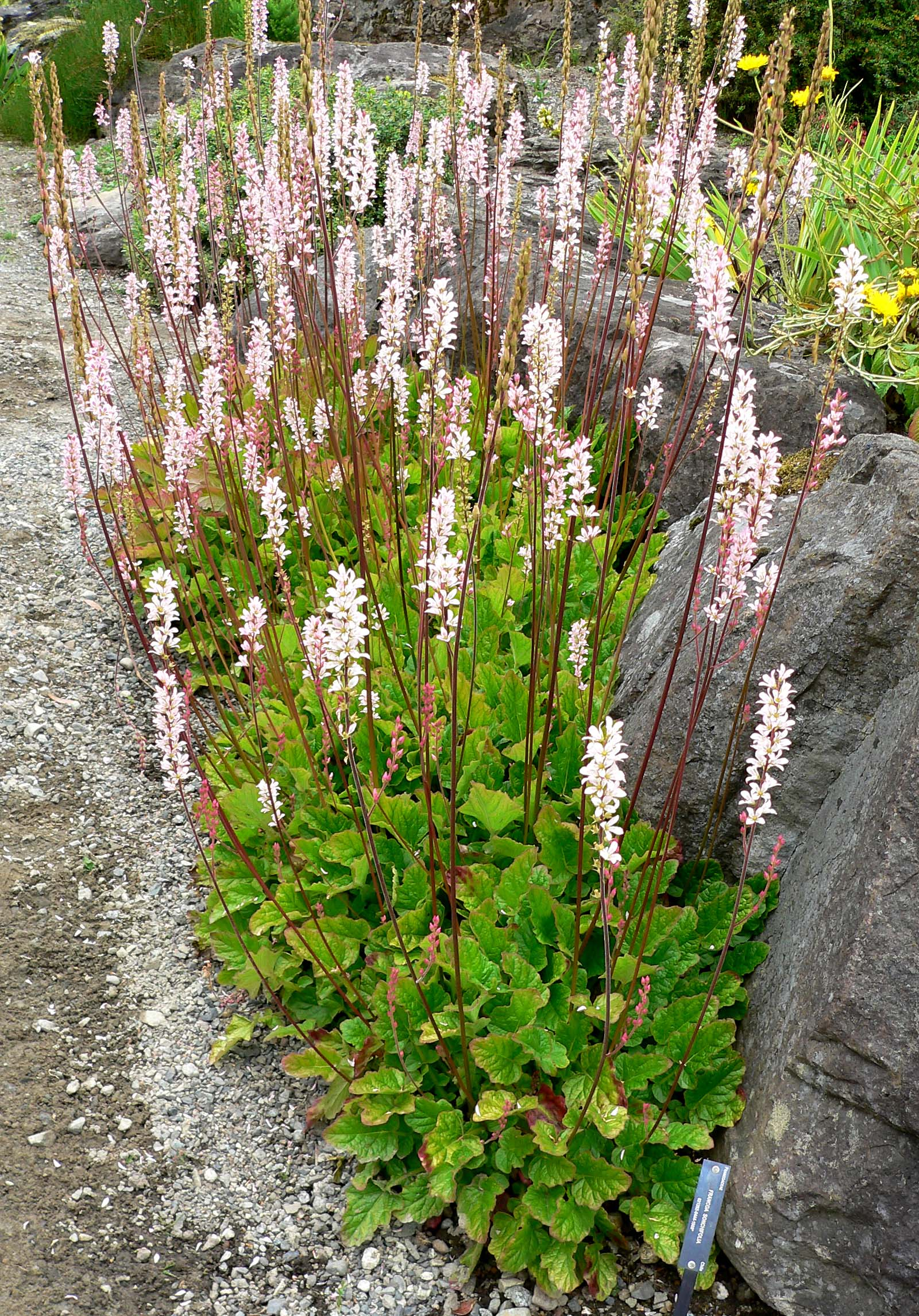
- Francoa sonchifolia

Scientific classification
- Kingdom: Plantae
- Clade: Tracheophytes
- Clade: Angiosperms
- Clade: Eudicots
- Clade: Rosids
- Order: Geraniales
- Family: Francoaceae
- Genus: Francoa; Cav.

= Francoa =

Species of plant

Francoa is a genus of flowering plants in the family Francoaceae, which consists of herbaceous perennials endemic to Chile. Plants may grow up to one metre high and produce basal clumps of round, deeply lobed, dark green, fuzzy leaves with winged leafstalks. Compact racemes of small, cup-shaped flowers, which are pink with red markings, appear in summer and early fall.

Plants of the world online recognise this genus as monotypic, with Francoa appendiculata as the only species. The Catalogue of the vascular plants of Chile recognise the varieties Francoa appendiculata Cav. var. appendiculata, Francoa appendiculata Cav. var. ramosa (D. Don) Rolfe and Francoa appendiculata Cav. var. sonchifolia (Cav.) Rolfe.

== Species ==
- Francoa alba H.Jacq.
- Francoa appendiculata A.Juss. ex Cav.
- Francoa glabrata DC.
- Francoa lyrata Ruiz & Pav.apud Lopez
- Francoa ramosa D.Don
- Francoa rupestris Poepp.
- Francoa sonchifolia Lodd. (Bridal wreath)
