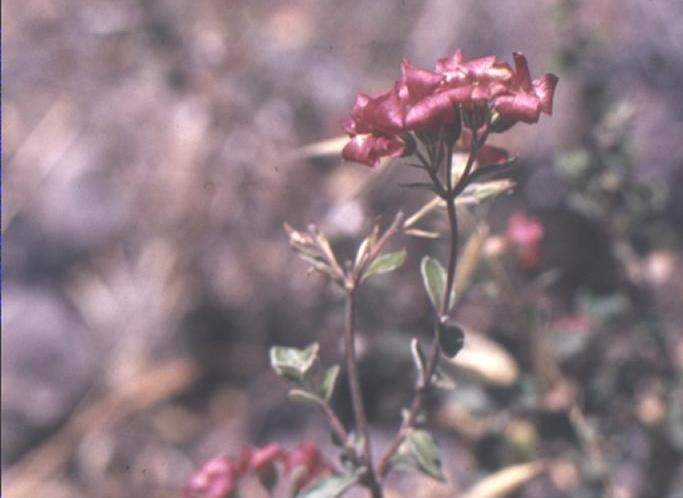
- Viviania marifolia in Chile

Scientific classification
- Kingdom: Plantae
- Clade: Tracheophytes
- Clade: Angiosperms
- Clade: Eudicots
- Clade: Rosids
- Order: Geraniales
- Family: Francoaceae
- Genus: Viviania; Cav., 1804

Species
- See text

Synonyms
- Araeoandra Lefor; Caesarea Cambess.; Cissarobryon Kunze ex Poepp.; Linostigma Klotzsch; Macraea Lindl.; Xeropetalon Hook.

= Viviania =

Genus of flowering plants

Viviania is a genus of flowering plants belonging to the family Francoaceae.

The genus is distributed across is Brazil, Argentina, Chile and Uruguay in southern South America.

== Known species ==
As accepted by Kew;

- Viviania albiflora (Cambess.) Reiche
- Viviania crenata (Hook.) G.Don
- Viviania elegans (Poepp.) Reiche & Johow
- Viviania linostigma R.Knuth
- Viviania marifolia Cav.
- Viviania ovata Phil.
- Viviania tenuicaulis Barnéoud

The genus name of Viviania is in honour of Domenico Viviani (1772–1840), an Italian botanist and naturalist. It was first described and published in Anales Ci. Nat. Vol.7 on page 211 in 1804.

The genus is recognized by the United States Department of Agriculture and the Agricultural Research Service, but they do not list any known species.
