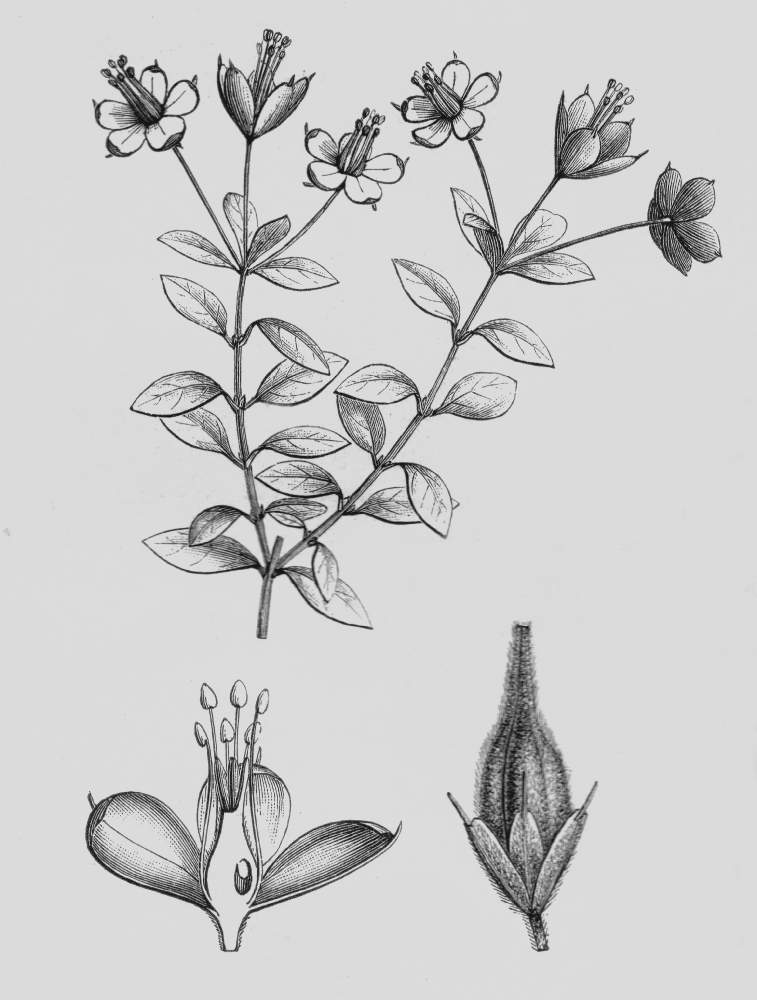
- Rhynchotheca spinosa

Scientific classification
- Kingdom: Plantae
- Clade: Tracheophytes
- Clade: Angiosperms
- Clade: Eudicots
- Clade: Rosids
- Order: Geraniales
- Family: Francoaceae
- Genus: Rhynchotheca; Ruiz & Pav.
- Species: R. spinosa

Binomial name
- Rhynchotheca spinosa Ruiz & Pav.

Synonyms
- Aulacostigma Turcz.; Rhyncothelia Pers.; Aulacostigma inerme Turcz.; Rhynchotheca diversifolia Kunth; Rhynchotheca integrifolia Kunth; Rhynchotheca spinosa var. diversifolia R.Knuth; Rhynchotheca spinosa var. integrifolia (Kunth) R.Knuth; Rhynchotheca spinosa var. lobata R.Knuth

= Rhynchotheca =

Genus of flowering plants

Rhynchotheca is a genus of flowering plants belonging to the family Francoaceae. It includes a single species, Rhynchotheca spinosa, a shrub native to Ecuador to Peru.
