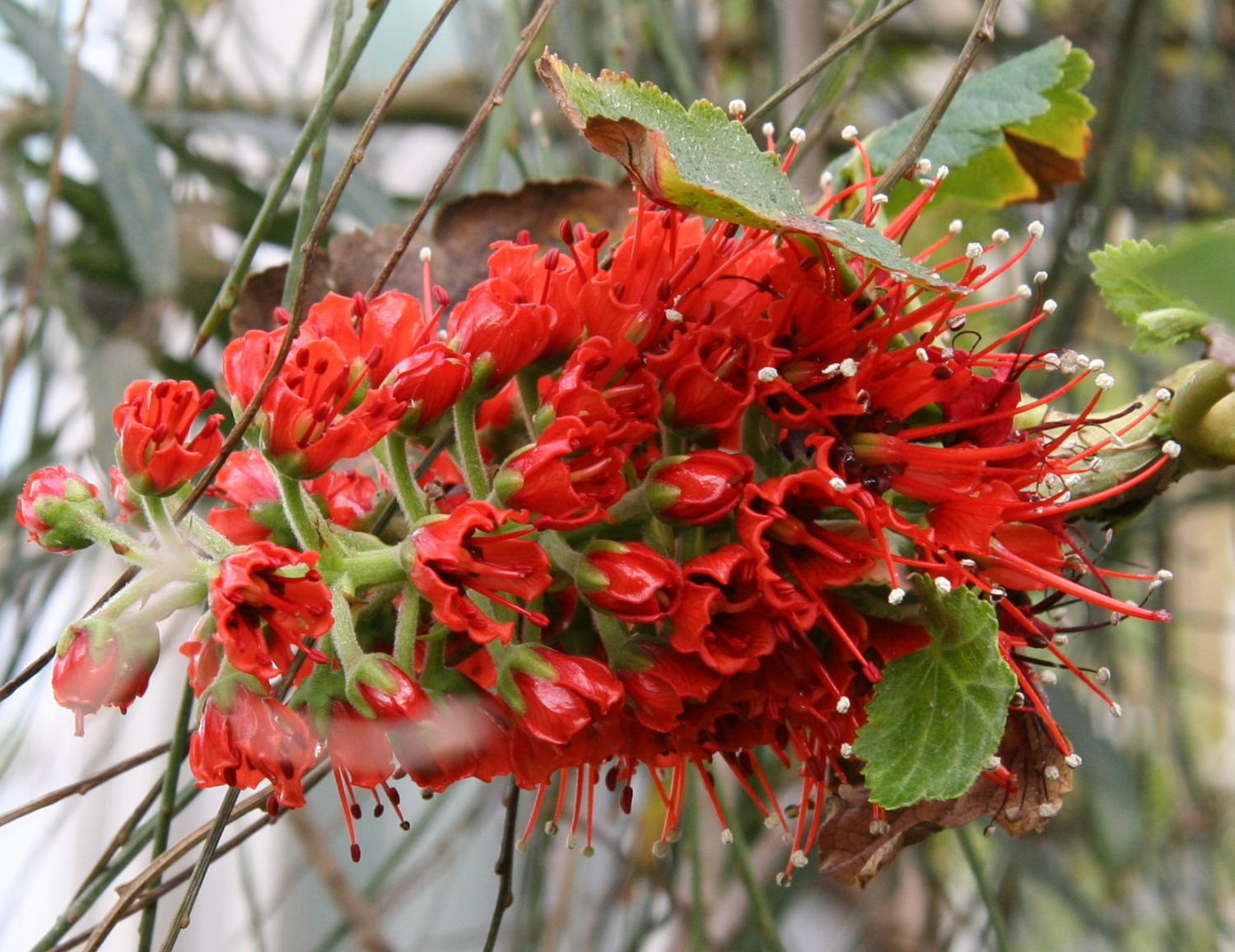

Conservation status
- Least Concern (IUCN 3.1)

Scientific classification
- Kingdom: Plantae
- Clade: Tracheophytes
- Clade: Angiosperms
- Clade: Eudicots
- Clade: Rosids
- Order: Geraniales
- Family: Francoaceae
- Genus: Greyia
- Species: G. sutherlandii

Binomial name
- Greyia sutherlandii Hook. & Harv.

= Greyia sutherlandii =

Species of flowering plant

Greyia sutherlandii, also known as Natal bottlebrush, is a species of flowering plant in the family Francoaceae. It is native to South Africa, Eswatini, and Lesotho.

== Appearance ==
Greyia sutherlandii is a small to medium-sized tree that can reach heights of up to 10 meters (30 feet). It has distinctive bottlebrush-like flower clusters and elliptical leaves.
