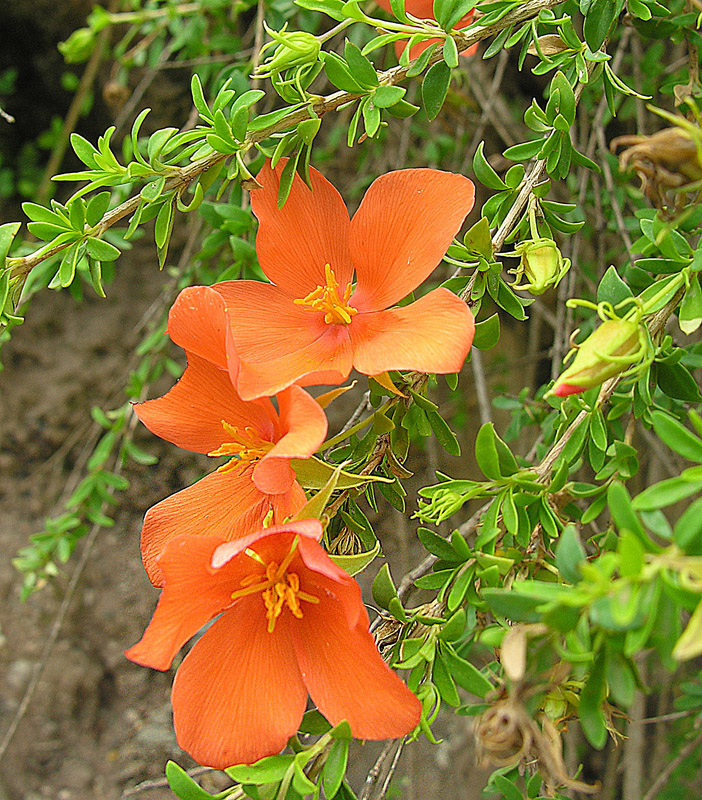
- Balbisia miniata

Scientific classification
- Kingdom: Plantae
- Clade: Tracheophytes
- Clade: Angiosperms
- Clade: Eudicots
- Clade: Rosids
- Order: Geraniales
- Family: Francoaceae
- Genus: Balbisia; Cav., 1804

Species
- See text

Synonyms
- Cistocarpus Kunth; Dematophyllum Griseb.; Hyperum C.Presl; Ledocarpon Desf.; Ledocarpum DC.; Wendtia Meyen; Martiniera Guill.

= Balbisia =

Genus of flowering plants

Balbisia is a genus of flowering plants belonging to the family Francoaceae. It is also in the Vivianiaceae subfamily.

The genus is distributed across is Argentina, Bolivia, Chile and Peru in southern South America.

== Known species ==
As accepted by Kew;

- Balbisia aphanifolia (Griseb.) Hunz. & Ariza
- Balbisia calycina (Griseb.) Hunz. & Ariza
- Balbisia gracilis (Meyen) Hunz. & Ariza
- Balbisia integrifolia R.Knuth
- Balbisia meyeniana Klotzsch
- Balbisia microphylla (Phil.) Reiche
- Balbisia miniata (I.M.Johnst.) Descole, O'Donell & Lourteig
- Balbisia peduncularis (Lindl.) D.Don
- Balbisia stitchkinii Ricardi
- Balbisia verticillata Cav.

The genus name of Balbisia is in honour of Giovanni Battista Balbis (1772–1840), an Italian botanist and politician who worked in Italy and France.. It was first described and published in Anales Ci. Nat. Vol.7 on page 62 in 1804.

The genus is recognized by the United States Department of Agriculture and the Agricultural Research Service, but they do not list any known species.
