= Hrabě =

Hrabě, Hrabětová is a Czech surname. Notable people with the surname include:

- Antonín Hrabě (1902–?), Czech weightlifter
- František Hrabě, Czechoslovak slalom canoeist
- Václav Hrabě (1940–1965), Czech poet and writer
