= Tritonia septemtrionalis =

Scientific classification
- Kingdom: Animalia
- Phylum: Mollusca
- Class: Gastropoda
- Order: Nudibranchia
- Suborder: Tritoniacea
- Family: Tritoniidae
- Genus: Tritonia
- Species: T. septemtrionalis

Binomial name
- Tritonia septemtrionalis (Baba, 1937)

Species of gastropod

Tritonia septemtrionalis is a species of dendronotid nudibranch. It is a marine gastropod mollusc in the family Tritoniidae.

OBIS listed Tritonia septentrionalis Baba, 1938.
