= Chaetium =

Scientific classification
- Kingdom: Plantae
- Clade: Tracheophytes
- Clade: Angiosperms
- Clade: Monocots
- Clade: Commelinids
- Order: Poales
- Family: Poaceae
- Subfamily: Panicoideae
- Supertribe: Panicodae
- Tribe: Paniceae
- Subtribe: Melinidinae
- Genus: Chaetium; Nees

Type species
- Chaetium festucoides Nees

Synonyms
- Panicum sect. Chaetium (Nees) Döll; Berchtoldia J.Presl

Genus of grasses

Chaetium is a genus of Neotropical plants in the grass family.

Species

- Chaetium bromoides (J.Presl) Benth. - Mexico, Central America
- Chaetium cubanum (C.Wright) Hitchc. - Cuba
- Chaetium festucoides Nees - Colombia (Bolívar), Venezuela (Guárico, Monagas), Brazil (Rio Grande do Norte, Ceará, Paraíba, Piauí, Maranhão, Pernambuco)

== See also ==
- List of Poaceae genera
