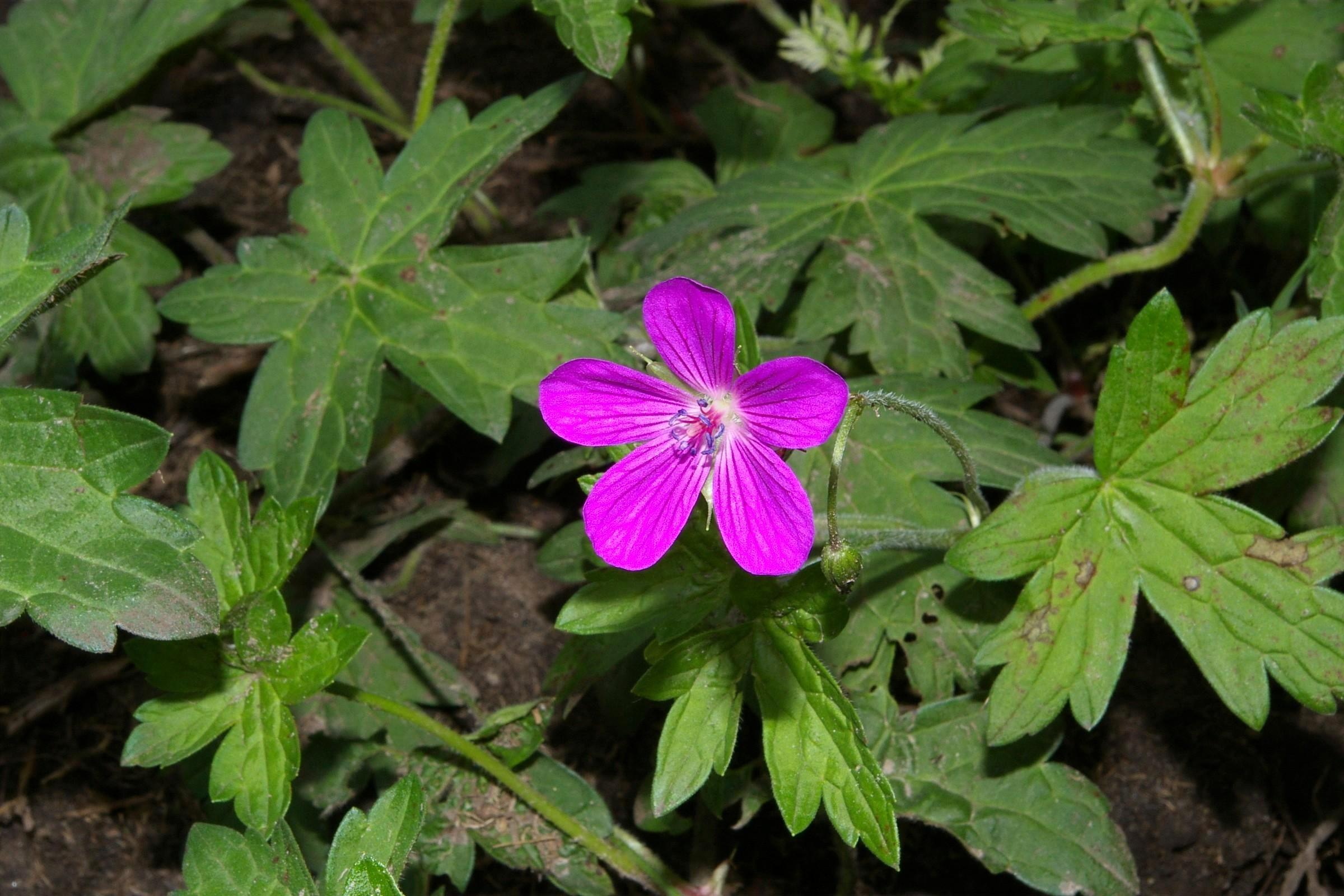
- Geranium palustre

Scientific classification
- Kingdom: Plantae
- Clade: Tracheophytes
- Clade: Angiosperms
- Clade: Eudicots
- Clade: Rosids
- Clade: Malvids
- Order: Geraniales; Juss. ex Bercht. & J.Presl

Families
- Geraniaceae; Francoaceae

= Geraniales =

Order of flowering plants in the rosid subclade of eudicots

Geraniales is a small order of flowering plants, included within the rosid subclade of eudicots. The largest family in the order is Geraniaceae with over 800 species. In addition, the order includes the smaller Francoaceae with about 40 species. Most Geraniales are herbaceous, but there are also shrubs and small trees.

Flower morphology of the Geraniales is rather conserved. They are usually perfectly pentamerous and pentacyclic without fused organs besides the carpels of the superior gynoecium. The androecium is obdiplostemonous. Only a few genera are tetramerous (Francoa, Dimorphopetalum, Melianthus). In some genera some stamens (Pelargonium) or a complete whorl of stamens are reduced (Erodium, Melianthus). In the genera Hypseocharis and Monsonia there are 15 instead of the usual ten stamens. Most genera bear nectariferous flowers. The nectary glands are formed by the receptacle and are localised at the bases of the antesepalous stamens.

The economic importance of Geraniales is low. Some species of the genus Pelargonium (Geraniaceae) are cultivated for their aromatic oil used in the perfume industry. Some other species, also mostly within Geraniaceae, have horticultural or medicinal uses. A Paleobotanic record is missing.

== Taxonomy ==
=== Origins ===
The botanical authority for Geraniales is given to Jussieu, but since the original description did not fulfill all the rules for a valid publication and was subsequently validly published, attribution is given to both Jussieu and the subsequent publication, hence the designation Geraniales Juss. ex Bercht. & J.Presl Jussieu, who developed the concept of botanical families, described the Gerania, as a grouping of five genera, including Geranium. Although Jussieu used the term Ordo this did not correspond to current understandings of the term Order. The subsequent attribution occurred in 1820, in the Czech text O Prirozenosti Rostlin, by Friedrich von Berchtold and Jan Svatopluk Presl, hence ex Bercht. & J.Presl. However, Berchtold and Presl also only described a rad (ordo) of five genera, which they called Geraniae. Other authorities have given the authority to Dumortier who described the family Geraniaceae, consisting of two tribes, Pelargonieae and Geranieae, each with three genera.

=== Circumscription ===
Geraniales contains two families, 11 genera and about 830 species. For a historical account of the circumscription of the order, see Price and Palmer (1993) Table 1.

Under the Cronquist system (1988), the Geraniales comprised the following five families:

- family Geraniaceae
- family Oxalidaceae
- family Limnanthaceae
- family Tropaeolaceae
- family Balsaminaceae

While the Dahlgren system (1980) was much larger in circumscription with 16 families, only two of which were in Cronquist's construction, and placed the order in the superorder Rutiflorae:

- family Zygophyllaceae
- family Nitrariaceae
- family Peganaceae
- family Balanitaceae
- family Erythroxylaceae
- family Humiriaceae
- family Linaceae
- family Ctenolophonaceae
- family Ixonanthaceae
- family Lepidobotryaceae
- family Oxalidaceae (including Averrhoaceae)
- family Geraniaceae
- family Dirachmaceae
- family Ledocarpaceae
- family Vivianiaceae
- family Biebersteiniaceae

Other modern systems include those of Takhtajan (1987) with nine families, and Thorne (1992). Thorne's system was the same as Cronquist's except that Biebersteiniaceae, Dirachmaceae, Ledocarpaceae, and Vivianiaceae were reduced to subfamilies of Geraniaceae.

=== Molecular phylogenetics: Angiosperm Phylogeny Group ===
The elucidation of the relationships within the order by morphological or cytological methods alone had proven difficult as demonstrated by the widely different treatment by various authorities. For instance Cronquist and Thorne immersed the families Biebersteiniaceae, Dirachmaceae, Ledocarpaceae, Rhynchothecaceae and Vivianiaceae within Geraniaceae (Geraniaceae sensu lato), whereas Dahlgren and others maintained them as separate taxa, maintaining a "core" Geraniaceae (Geraniaceae sensu stricto). Price and Palmer (1993) were among the first investigators to apply molecular phylogenetics to this order, using the chloroplast gene rbcL. (Note: Part of a much larger multi-institutional study of the phylogeny of seed plants (Ann. Missouri Bot. Gard. 1993)) This disassembled the traditional morphologically defined grouping of dicotyledons, replacing it with a series of nested clades. The Geraniales segregated in the eudicot clade, specifically in the rosid subclade.

The family circumscription of the Angiosperm Phylogeny Group (APG) of 1998 placed Geraniales Dumort. amongst the rosids with the following six families:

Geraniales Dumort. 1829

- Francoaceae A.Juss., 1832
- Geraniaceae Juss., 1789 [ + Hypseocharitaceae Wedd., 1861]
- Greyiaceae Hutch., 1926
- Ledocarpaceae Meyen, 1834
- Melianthaceae Bercht. & J.Presl, 1820
- Vivianiaceae Klotzsch, 1836

Hypseocharitaceae were a small family of eight species of the genus Hypseocharis found in the tropical mountainous regions of the Andes. The APG provided the option of considering them as a separate family or subsumed into Geraniaceae. By 2003, when the APG was published, it was apparent that the small families Francoaceae, Greyiaceae and Melianthaceae were closely related and were collapsed into one family as Melanthiaceae with Francoaceae as an optional synonym. Thus the number of families was reduced to four.

The APG III classification (2009) was typical of newer arrangements. In this definition, Hypseocharitaceae was included within Geraniaceae, Francoaceae and Greyiaceae were included within Melianthaceae, and Ledocarpaceae was included within the Vivianiaceae.

However, Considerable rearrangements took place in the 2016 APG IV system. Francoaceae was substituted for Melianthaceae, due to nomenclatural priority. The latter subsumed Vivianiaceae based on the work of Sytsma, Spalink & Berger (2014). However, there remains substantial uncertainty regarding the relationships within Francoaceae sensu stricto (s.s.), Melianthaceae (Bersama Fresen. and Melianthus L.) and Ledocarpaceae. Here, Vivianiaceae is used as a later synonym for Ledocarpaceae. This due to conflicting evidence (see Palazzesi et al., 2012). The APG chose to follow the broader circumscription for the time being till these differences are resolved.

This leaves the order Geraniales with only two families: Geraniaceae and Francoaceae (including Bersamaceae, Greyiaceae, Ledocarpaceae, Melianthaceae, Rhynchothecaceae and Vivianiaceae).

The Vivianiaceae and Ledocarpaceae were included within the Geraniaceae, and the Hypseocharitaceae within the Oxalidaceae, which are now treated in the order Oxalidales. The Melianthaceae were placed within the Sapindales, the Greyiaceae and Francoaceae within the Rosales, the latter subsumed within the Saxifragaceae.

Recent comparison of DNA-fragments from species within the order resulted in the following phylogenetic tree.

- Geraniales
  - - Hypseocharitaceae
    - Geraniaceae
  - - Francoaceae in sensu lato:
      - Francoaceae (core)
      - Viviania and Balbisia formerly Vivianiaceae
    - Melianthus, Greyia and Bersama formerly Melianthaceae

== Bibliography ==
- "rbcL Sequence Data and Phylogenetic Reconstruction in Seed Plants". Annals of the Missouri Botanical Garden. 80 (3): 523–786. Summer 1993. JSTOR i317486. (also at Biodiversity Heritage Library: here)
  - Chase, Mark W.; Soltis, Douglas E.; Olmstead, Richard G.; Morgan, David; Les, Donald H.; Mishler, Brent D.; Duvall, Melvin R.; Price, Robert A.; Hills, Harold G.; Qiu, Yin-Long; Kron, Kathleen A.; Rettig, Jeffrey H.; Conti, Elena; Palmer, Jeffrey D.; Manhart, James R.; Sytsma, Kenneth J.; Michaels, Helen J.; Kress, W. John; Karol, Kenneth G.; Clark, W. Dennis; Hedren, Mikael; Gaut, Brandon S.; Jansen, Robert K.; Kim, Ki-Joong; Wimpee, Charles F.; Smith, James F.; Furnier, Glenn R.; Strauss, Steven H.; Xiang, Qui-Yun; Plunkett, Gregory M.; Soltis, Pamela S.; Swensen, Susan M.; Williams, Stephen E.; Gadek, Paul A.; Quinn, Christopher J.; Eguiarte, Luis E.; Golenberg, Edward; Learn, Gerald H.; Graham, Sean W.; Barrett, Spencer C. H.; Dayanandan, Selvadurai; Albert, Victor A. (1993). "Phylogenetics of Seed Plants: An Analysis of Nucleotide Sequences from the Plastid Gene rbcL" (PDF). Annals of the Missouri Botanical Garden. 80 (3): 528. doi:10.2307/2399846. hdl:1969.1/179875. JSTOR 2399846.
  - Price, Robert A.; Palmer, Jeffrey D. (1993). "Phylogenetic Relationships of the Geraniaceae and Geraniales from rbcL Sequence Comparisons". Annals of the Missouri Botanical Garden. 80 (3): 661–671. doi:10.2307/2399852. JSTOR 2399852.
- Bakker, Freek T (26 March 2003). "Geraniales (Geranium)". eLS. Wiley. doi:10.1038/npg.els.0003716. ISBN 978-0470016176.
- Berchtold, Friedrich von; Presl, Jan Svatopluk (1820). O Prirozenosti Rostlin. Prague: Krala Wiljma Endersa.
- Candolle, A. P. de (1813). Théorie élémentaire de la botanique, ou exposition des principes de la classification naturelle et de l'art de décrire et d'etudier les végétaux (in French).
- Christenhusz, Maarten JM & Byng, J. W. (2016). "The number of known plants species in the world and its annual increase". Phytotaxa. 261 (3): 201–217. doi:10.11646/phytotaxa.261.3.1.
- Cronquist, A (1988) [1968]. The evolution and classification of flowering plants (2nd ed.). Bronx, NY: New York Botanical Garden. ISBN 9780893273323.
- Dahlgren, R. M. T. (February 1980). "A revised system of classification of the angiosperms". Botanical Journal of the Linnean Society. 80 (2): 91–124. doi:10.1111/j.1095-8339.1980.tb01661.x.
- Dumortier, Barthélemy-Charles (1829). Analyse des familles des plantes: avec l'indication des principaux genres qui s'y rattachent (in French). Tournay: J Casterman.
- Jussieu, Antoine Laurent de (1789). Genera Plantarum, secundum ordines naturales disposita juxta methodum in Horto Regio Parisiensi exaratam (in Latin). Paris: apud viduam Herissant et Theophilum Barrois. OCLC 5161409.
- Pelletier, Bernard (2016) [2012]. Empire Biota: Taxonomy and Evolution (2nd ed.). Lulu. ISBN 978-1-329-87400-8.
- Watson, L.; Dallwitz, M.J. (2016). "The families of flowering plants: descriptions, illustrations, identification, and information retrieval". DELTA – DEscription Language for TAxonomy. Archived from the original on 15 May 2016.
- ICN (2012). "International Code of Nomenclature for algae, fungi, and plants". Bratislava: International Association for Plant Taxonomy.
- "Tropicos". Missouri Botanical Garden. 2015.
- IPNI (2015). "The International Plant Names Index".

=== APG ===
- APG I (1998). "An ordinal classification for the families of flowering plants". Annals of the Missouri Botanical Garden. 85 (4): 531–553. doi:10.2307/2992015. JSTOR 2992015.
- APG II (2003). "An Update of the Angiosperm Phylogeny Group Classification for the orders and families of flowering plants: APG II". Botanical Journal of the Linnean Society. 141 (4): 399–436. doi:10.1046/j.1095-8339.2003.t01-1-00158.x.
- APG III (2009). "An Update of the Angiosperm Phylogeny Group classification for the orders and families of flowering plants: APG III". Botanical Journal of the Linnean Society. 161 (2): 105–121. doi:10.1111/j.1095-8339.2009.00996.x. hdl:10654/18083.
- APG IV (2016). "An update of the Angiosperm Phylogeny Group classification for the orders and families of flowering plants: APG IV". Botanical Journal of the Linnean Society. 181 (1): 1–20. doi:10.1111/boj.12385.
