= Jan Svatopluk Presl =

Bohemian natural scientist

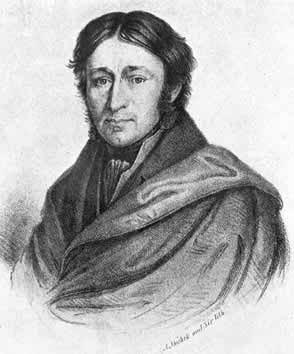
- Born: 4 September 1791; Prague, Bohemia, Habsburg monarchy
- Died: 6 April 1849 (aged 57); Prague, Bohemia, Austrian Empire
- Education: Charles University
- Scientific career
- Fields: Botany, Chemistry
- Author abbrev. (botany): J.Presl

Signature
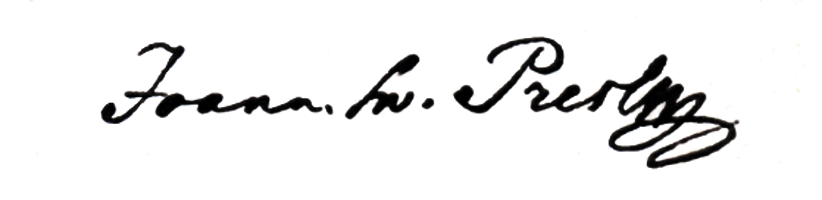

Jan Svatopluk Presl (4 September 1791 – 6 April 1849) was a Czech natural scientist.

He was the brother of botanist Carl Borivoj Presl (1794–1852). The Czech Botanical Society commemorated the two brothers by naming its principal publication Preslia (founded in 1914). He was the author of Czech scientific terminology of various branches of science, including the Czech chemical nomenclature. He was the co-author of an important Czech taxonomic work, O Přirozenosti Rostlin. The brothers co-edited the exsiccata series Vegetabilia cryptogamica Boëmiae collecta a Joanne et Carolo Presl.

== Selected publications ==
- Berchtold, Friedrich von; Presl, Jan Svatopluk (1820). O Přirozenosti Rostlin. Prague: Krala Wiljma Endersa.
- Berchtold, Friedrich von; Presl, Jan Svatopluk (1820–1835). O Přirozenosti Rostlin aneb rostlinář. Prague: Jos Krause.

== See also ==
- Carl Borivoj Presl (C.Presl, 1794–1852) — Czech botanist, and younger brother of Jan Presl.
- Category:Taxa named by Jan Svatopluk Presl
