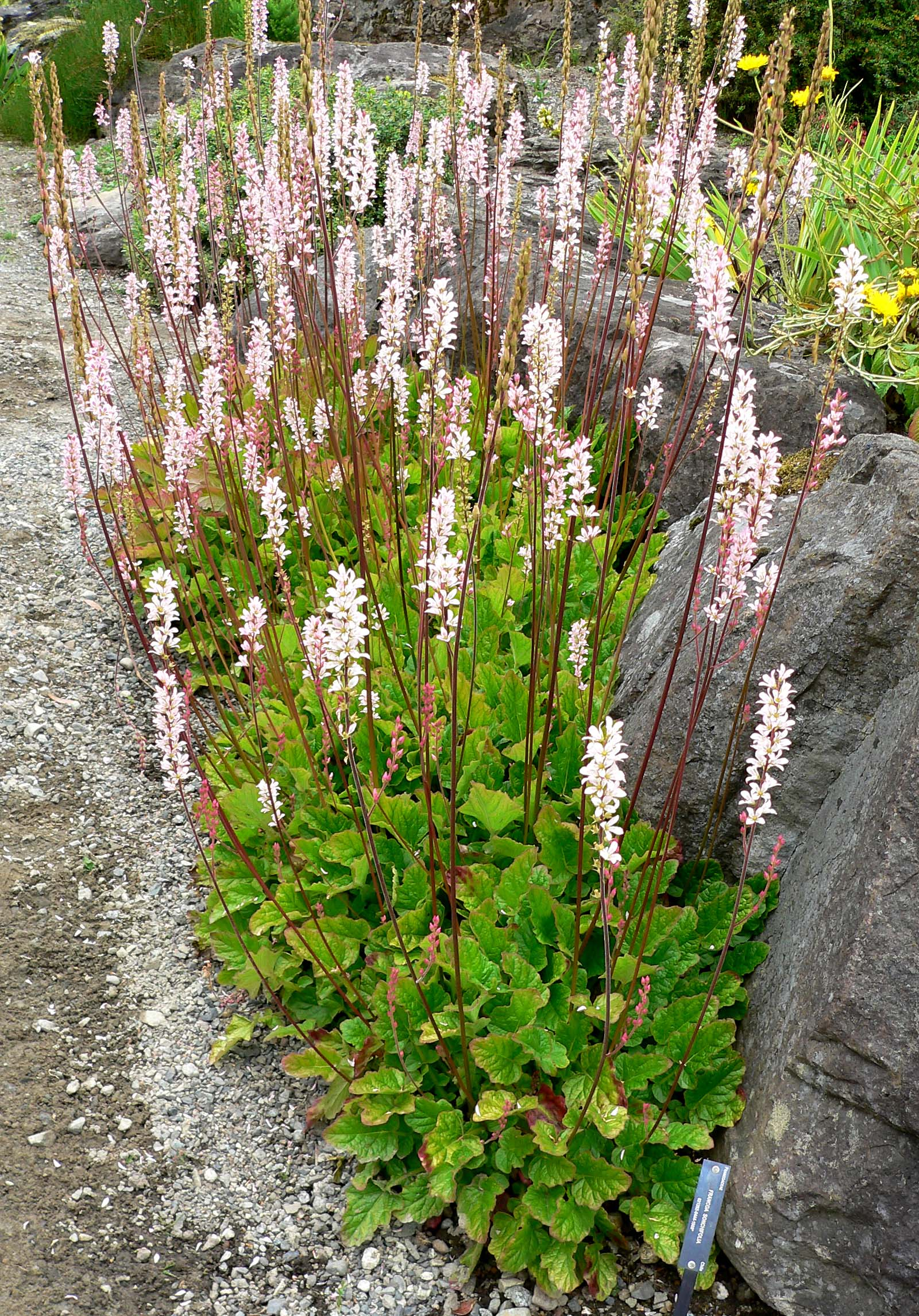
- Francoa sonchifolia

Scientific classification
- Kingdom: Plantae
- Clade: Tracheophytes
- Clade: Angiosperms
- Clade: Eudicots
- Clade: Rosids
- Order: Geraniales
- Family: Francoaceae; A.Juss.

Genera
- See text

Synonyms
- Bersamaceae; Ledocarpaceae; Rhynchothecaceae; Vivianiaceae

= Francoaceae =

Family of flowering plants

The Francoaceae are a small family of flowering plants in the order Geraniales, including the genus Francoa, commonly known as bridal wreaths. The Francoaceae are recognized as a family under various classification schemes. Under the 2009 APG III system the Francoaceae were included within the Melianthaceae. In the 2016 APG IV system the Francoaceae are again recognized as a family, with Melianthaceae included in the circumscription of Francoaceae.

== Genera ==
As of May 2025, Plants of the World Online included the following genera in Francoaceae:

- Balbisia Cav.
- Bersama Fresen.
- Dimorphopetalum Bertero (synonym Tetilla DC.)
- Francoa Cav.
- Greyia Hook. & Harv.
- Melianthus L.
- Rhynchotheca Ruiz & Pav.
- Viviania Cav.
