= Hôtel de Ville, Oullins =

Town hall in Oullins, France

Hôtel de Ville
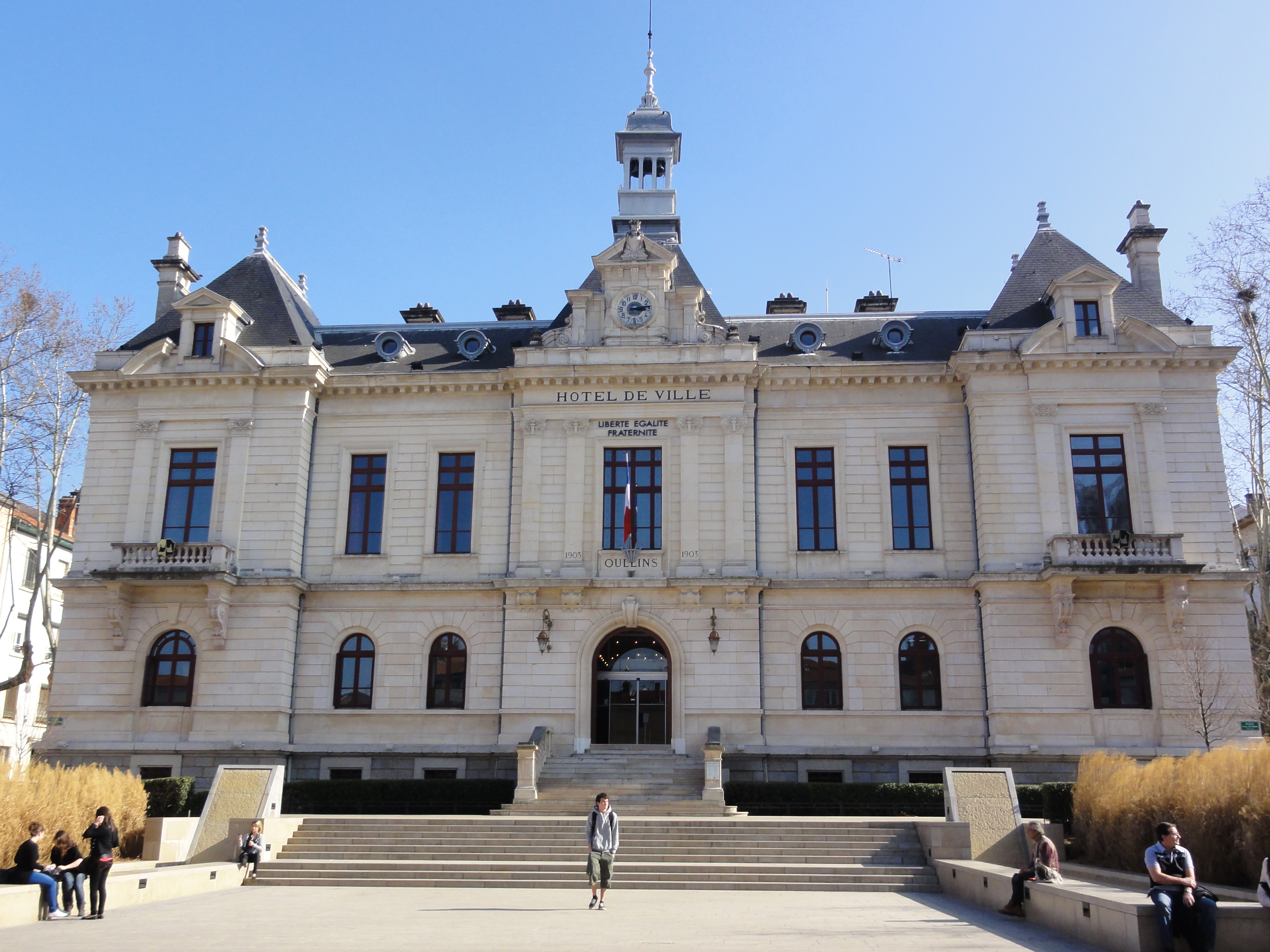
- The main frontage of the Hôtel de Ville in March 2012
- Interactive map of the Hôtel de Ville area

General information
- Type: City hall
- Architectural style: Neoclassical style
- Location: Oullins, France
- Coordinates: 45.7141°N 4.8070°E
- Completed: 1903

Design and construction
- Architect: Jean Clapot

The Hôtel de Ville (French pronunciation: [otɛl də vil], City Hall) is a municipal building in Oullins, Metropolis of Lyon, in eastern France, standing on Place Roger Salengro.

== History ==
Following the French Revolution, the town council initially met in the house of the mayor at the time. After finding this arrangement inadequate, in 1878, the council decided to commission a more substantial town hall. Designs were presented by Sieur Journoud in 1883, by the partnership of Giroud & Condemine in 1887, and then by Sieur Condemine alone in 1898. Each time they were rejected and it was only in the early 20th century that a satisfactory design was agreed.

The site the council selected, on the southeast side of Grande Rue, was occupied by the former Couvent des Carmélites (Covent of the Carmelites). The nuns vacated the site in 1870 and then sold it to the council in 1895. The foundation stone for the new building was laid on 6 April 1902. It was designed by Jean Clapot in the neoclassical style, built in ashlar stone and was officially opened by the Minister for the Navy, Camille Pelletan, on 8 November 1903.

The design involved a symmetrical main frontage of seven bays facing onto Grande Rue with the end bays projected forward as pavilions. The central bay, which was slightly projected forward, featured a short flight of steps leading up to a round headed opening with a moulded surround and a keystone. On the first floor, there was a casement window with a moulded surround flanked by two pairs of Ionic order pilasters supporting an entablature, a modillioned cornice and a clock. Behind the clock, there was a square bell tower with a finial. The other bays were fenestrated by rounded headed windows on the ground floor and by casement windows on the first floor. The end bays were augmented by balustraded balconies and by Ionic order pilasters on both sides of the first floor windows and, at roof level, they were surmounted by segmental pediments which were broken by dormer windows. Internally, the principal room was the Salle du Conseil (council chamber). A fine painting entitled "Fin de journée" by Cyprien Eugène Boulet depicting a shepherd tending his sheep was installed in the building in 1908. Some large vases made at the Manufacture nationale de Sèvres were also placed on display.

After the town was liberated from German occupation on 3 September 1944, during the Second World War, a liberation committee took office in the town hall.

In November 2023, following an announcement that Oullins would merge with Pierre-Bénite to form the new commune of Oullins-Pierre-Bénite, protestors entered the council chamber and demanded a referendum on the issue, before being removed by the national police.
