= Bioparco di Roma =

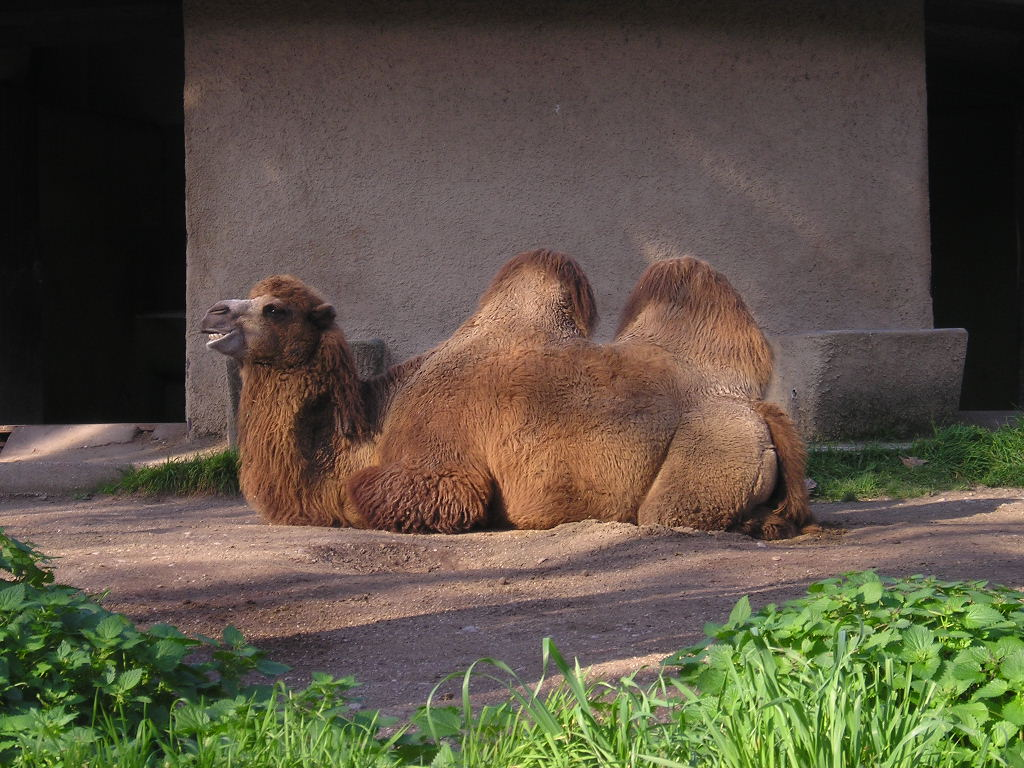
- Bactrian camel
- Interactive map of Bioparco di Roma
- 41°55′03″N 12°29′07″E
- Date opened: 5 January 1911
- Location: Rome, Italy
- Land area: 17 ha (42 acres)
- No. of animals: 1114
- No. of species: 222
- Annual visitors: 780,057 (2008)
- Memberships: EAZA, WAZA
- Public transit: Rome tramway network: ATAC bus network: 52, 53, 217, 360, 490, 910, 926
- Website: bioparco.it

Bioparco di Roma is a 17-hectare (42-acre) zoological garden located on part of the original Villa Borghese estate in Rome, Italy. There are 1,114 animals of 222 species maintained.

== History ==
The zoo was conceived in 1908 to hold exotic animal species for exhibition. Unlike other zoos at the time, which mainly existed for scientific purposes, this zoo was designed to entertain and amuse people. The zoo covered 12 hectares (30 acres) and was erected in the northern part of the Villa Borghese estate; it opened on 5 January 1911.

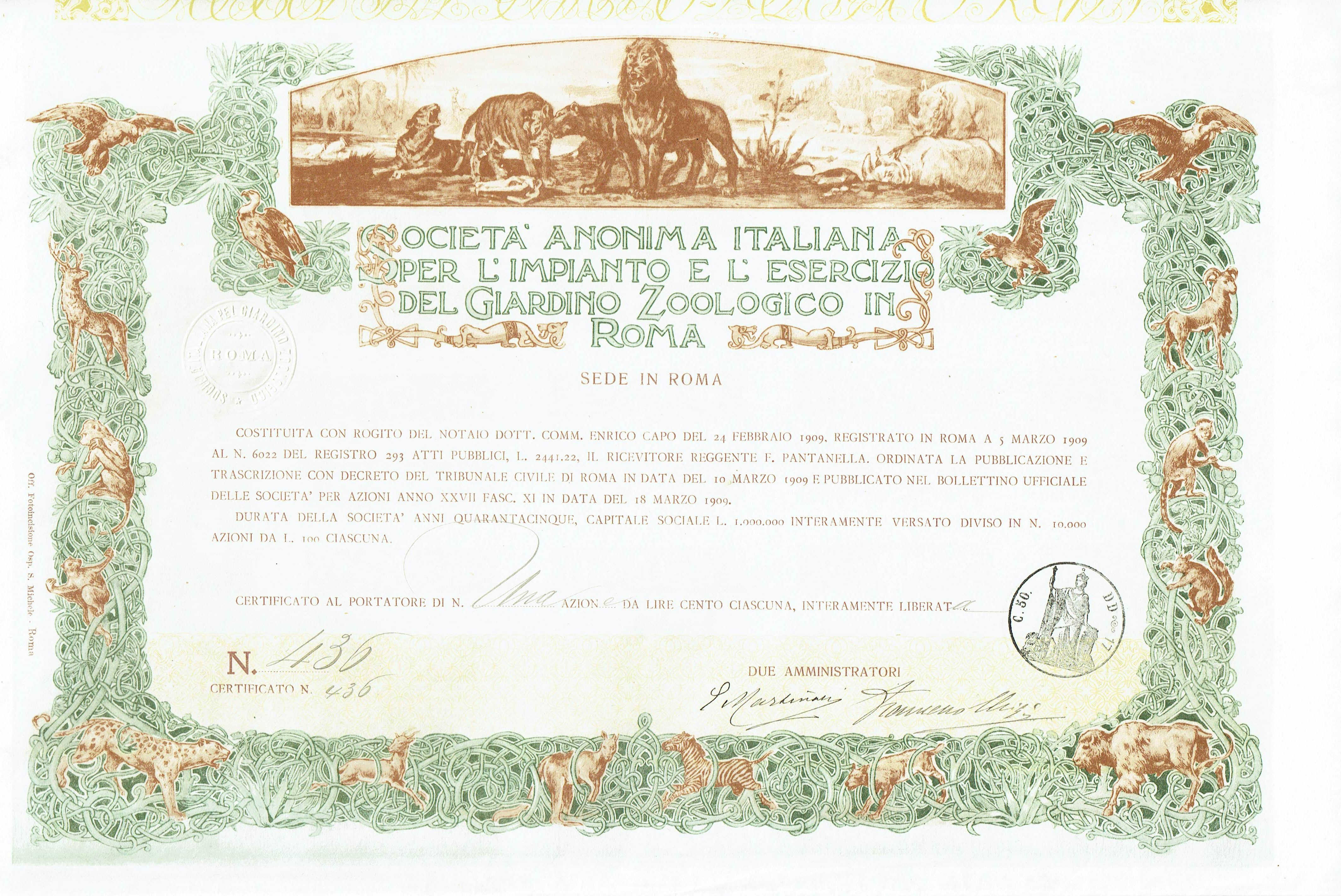
Share of the Giardino Zoologico in Roma, issued 18. March 1909

The zoo was designed by Carl Hagenbeck, who had already opened a zoo in Hamburg Stellingen. The park was built in the same style as the zoo in Hamburg: ditches and pits instead of bars, and generous green spaces.

This initial success was very short-lived. Attempts were made to stock the zoo with especially rare and exotic animals. Various park expansions were undertaken, and in 1926, a further expansion was planned into the neighbouring red deer park. In 1933, the architect Raffaele De Vico began his work on the new areas, which were to hold two main attractions: the large aviary and the reptile house which opened in 1935.

The zoo began to deteriorate, although many areas were renovated and others were fully rebuilt. In 1970, the reptile house had to be closed due to its deteriorating condition; renovations took about nine years and it was finally re-opened in 1983.

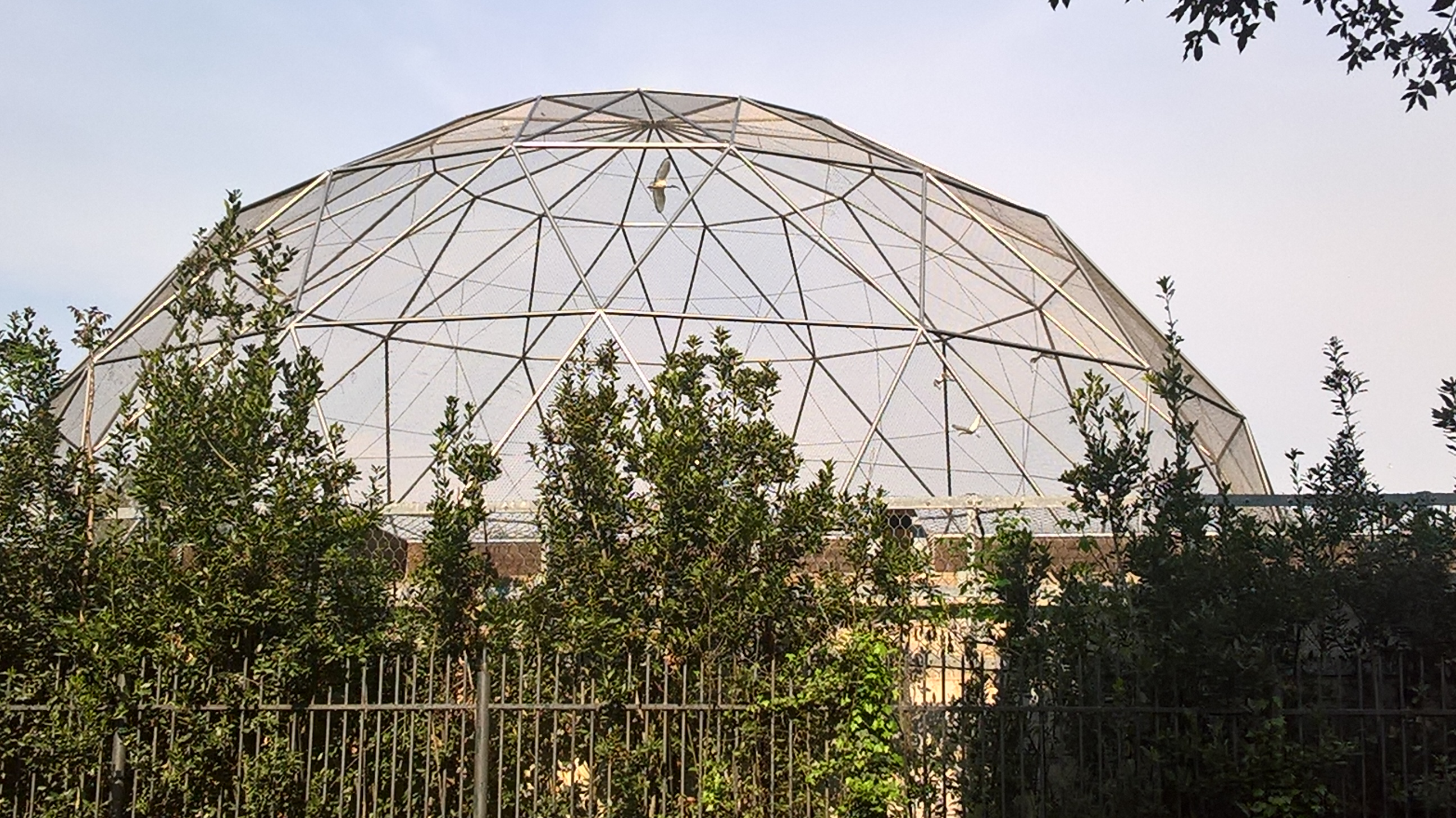
Aviary of the Bioparco in Rome

The idea to transform the zoo into a biopark was first suggested in 1994. In 1997, a master plan was produced based on the principles of the Gilman Foundation. In April 1998, the organisation Bioparco S.p.A. was established to be financed through the city of Rome with 51%, from Costa Edutainment with 39%, and from Cecchi Gori with 10%.

It is the oldest zoo in Italy and hosts approximately 1,200 animals of approximately 150 different species including mammals, reptiles and birds on a total area of approximately 155480m^{2}.

== Animals ==
As of 2022:

List

Mammals

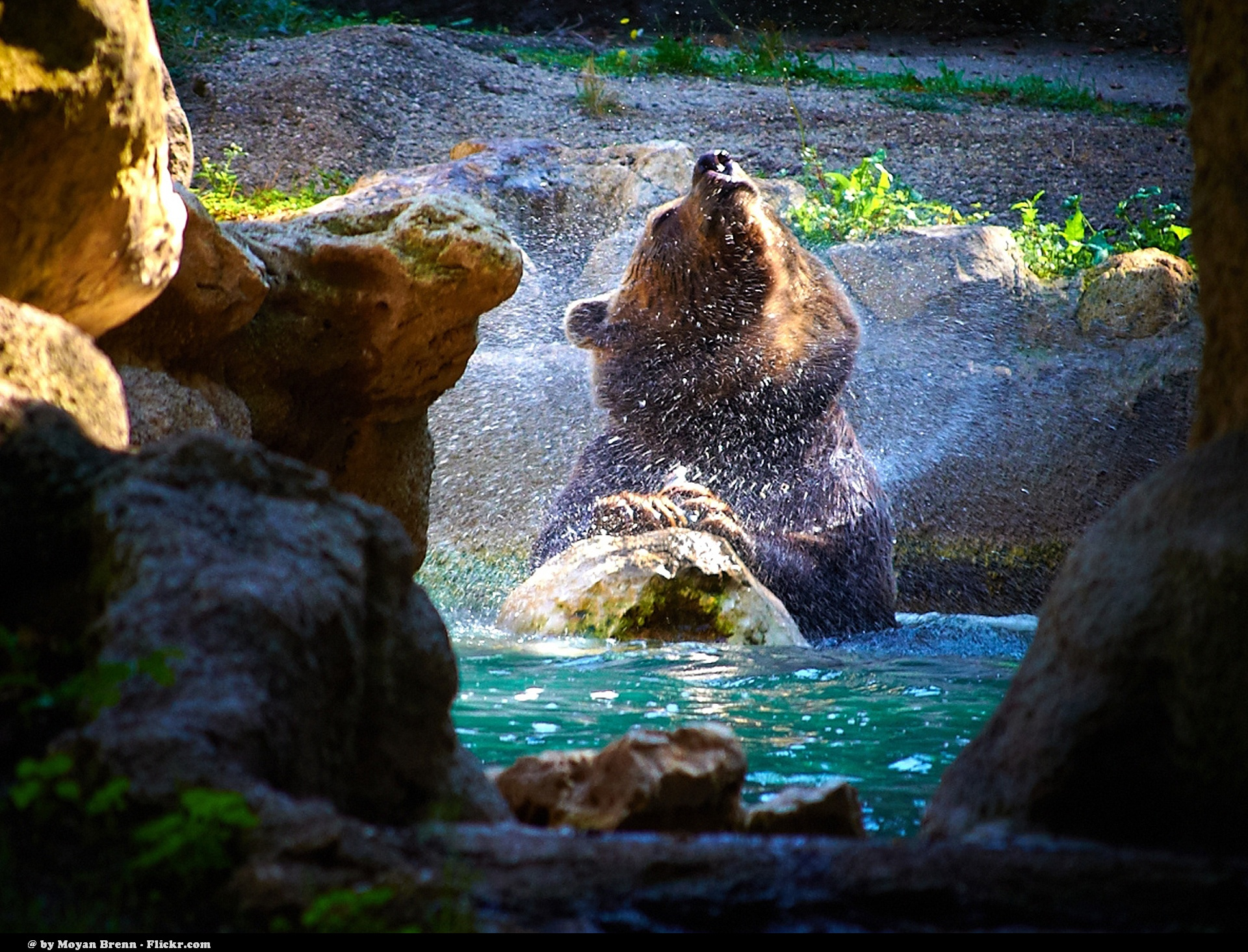
A bear in the Rome Bioparco

- Red-necked wallaby
- Big hairy armadillo
- Capybara
- Patagonian mara
- Asian small-clawed otter
- Binturong
- Meerkat
- Eurasian lynx
- Persian leopard
- Tiger
- Sumatran tiger
- Asiatic lion
- Eurasian wolf
- African wild dog
- Fennec fox
- Maned wolf
- Brown bear
- South American coati
- California sea lion
- Grey seal
- Ring-tailed lemur
- Black lemur
- Red ruffed lemur
- Pygmy marmoset
- Cotton-top tamarin
- Emperor tamarin
- Tufted capuchin
- White-collared mangabey
- Japanese macaque
- Mandrill
- Lar gibbon
- Chimpanzee
- Orangutan
- Asian elephant
- South American tapir
- Southern white rhinoceros
- Turkmenian kulan
- Waterbuck
- Common eland
- Wildebeest
- Greater kudu
- Yak
- Grévy's zebra
- Grant's zebra
- Hippopotamus
- Pygmy hippopotamus
- Red river hog
- Bactrian camel
- Guanaco
- Vicuña
- Reticulated giraffe
- Banteng
- European bison
- European mouflon
- Wild goat
- Himalayan tahr
- Nile lechwe
- Addax
- Dama gazelle

Birds

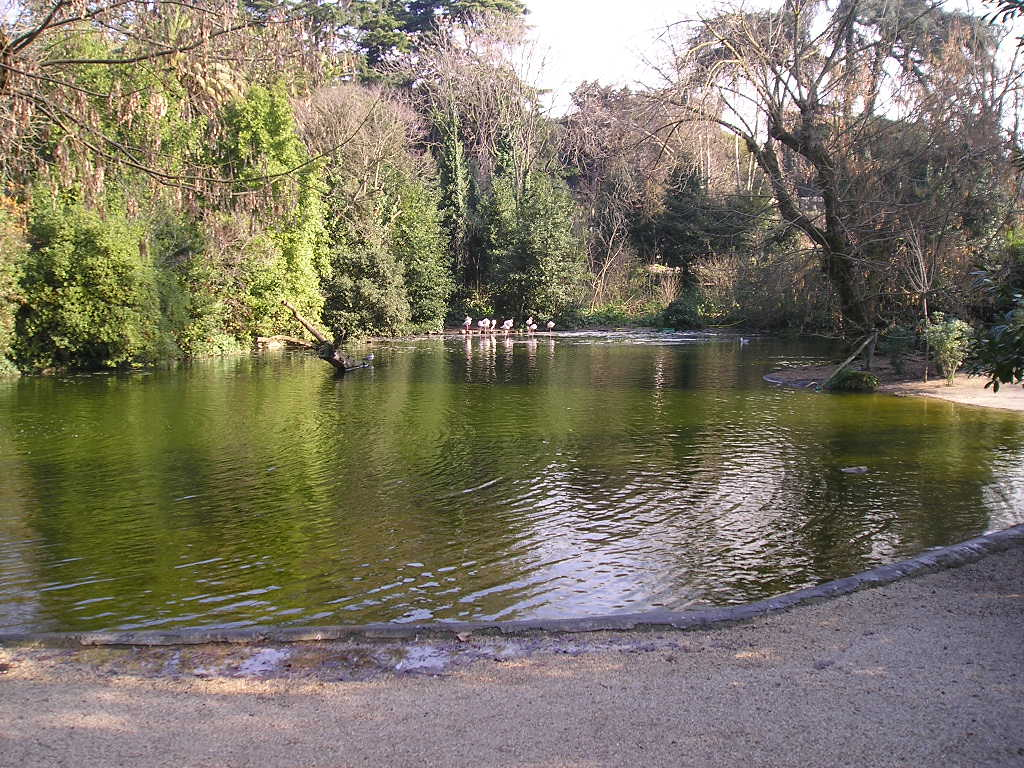
Flamingos in the Bioparco lake

- Common ostrich
- Emu
- Southern cassowary
- Greater rhea
- Crested guineafowl
- Indian peafowl
- Common shelduck
- Ruddy shelduck
- Egyptian goose
- Cape Barren goose
- Trumpeter swan
- Black swan
- Greylag goose
- Barnacle goose
- Mallard
- Pied avocet
- African penguin
- Great white pelican
- Dalmatian pelican
- Pink-backed pelican
- Eurasian spoonbill
- Roseate spoonbill
- African sacred ibis
- Northern bald ibis
- Scarlet ibis
- Cattle egret
- Marabou stork
- White stork
- Black stork
- Greater flamingo
- Grey crowned crane
- Salmon-crested cockatoo
- Blue-and-gold macaw
- Red-fronted macaw
- Abyssinian ground hornbill
- Golden eagle
- Mountain caracara
- Egyptian vulture
- Lappet-faced vulture
- Rüppell's vulture
- White-backed vulture
- King vulture
- Tawny owl
- Eurasian eagle-owl
- Snowy owl

Reptiles

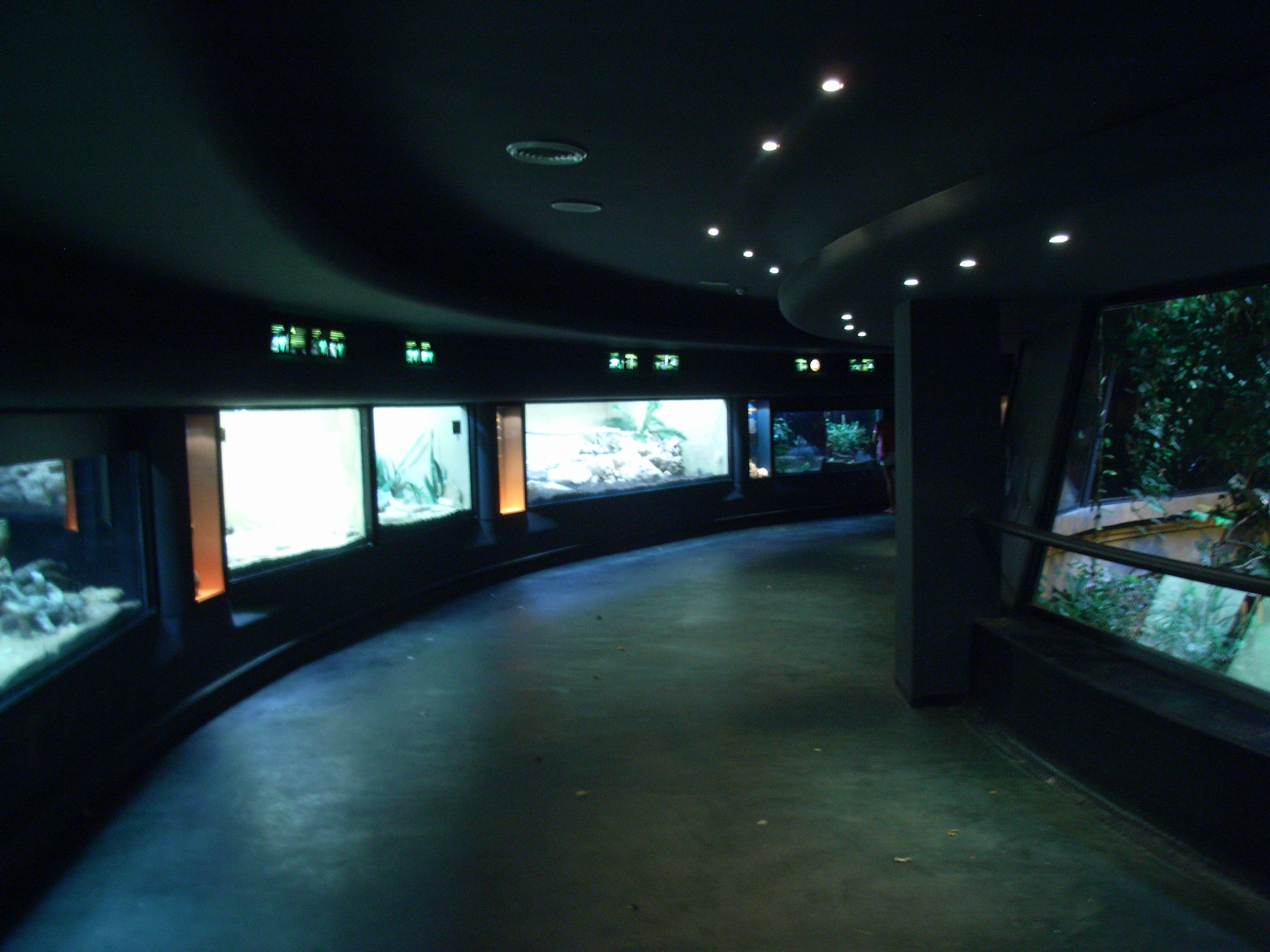
Interior of the reptile house

- Aldabra giant tortoise
- Alligator snapping turtle
- Elongated tortoise
- Giant musk turtle
- Kleinmann's tortoise
- Malayan box turtle
- Pancake tortoise
- Radiated tortoise
- Red-footed tortoise
- Spider tortoise
- Vietnamese pond turtle
- Smooth-fronted caiman
- Dwarf crocodile
- Nile crocodile
- Komodo dragon
- Blue-tongued skink
- Gila monster
- Philippine sailfin lizard
- Spiny-tailed monitor
- Standing's day gecko
- Common agama
- Rough-scaled lizard
- Cuban rock iguana
- Madagascan collared iguana
- Utila spiny-tailed iguana
- Ornate uromastyx
- Boa constrictor
- Green anaconda
- Yellow anaconda
- Madagascar tree boa
- Pacific ground boa
- Carpet python
- Central African rock python
- Sumatran short-tailed python
- Horned viper

== Gallery ==
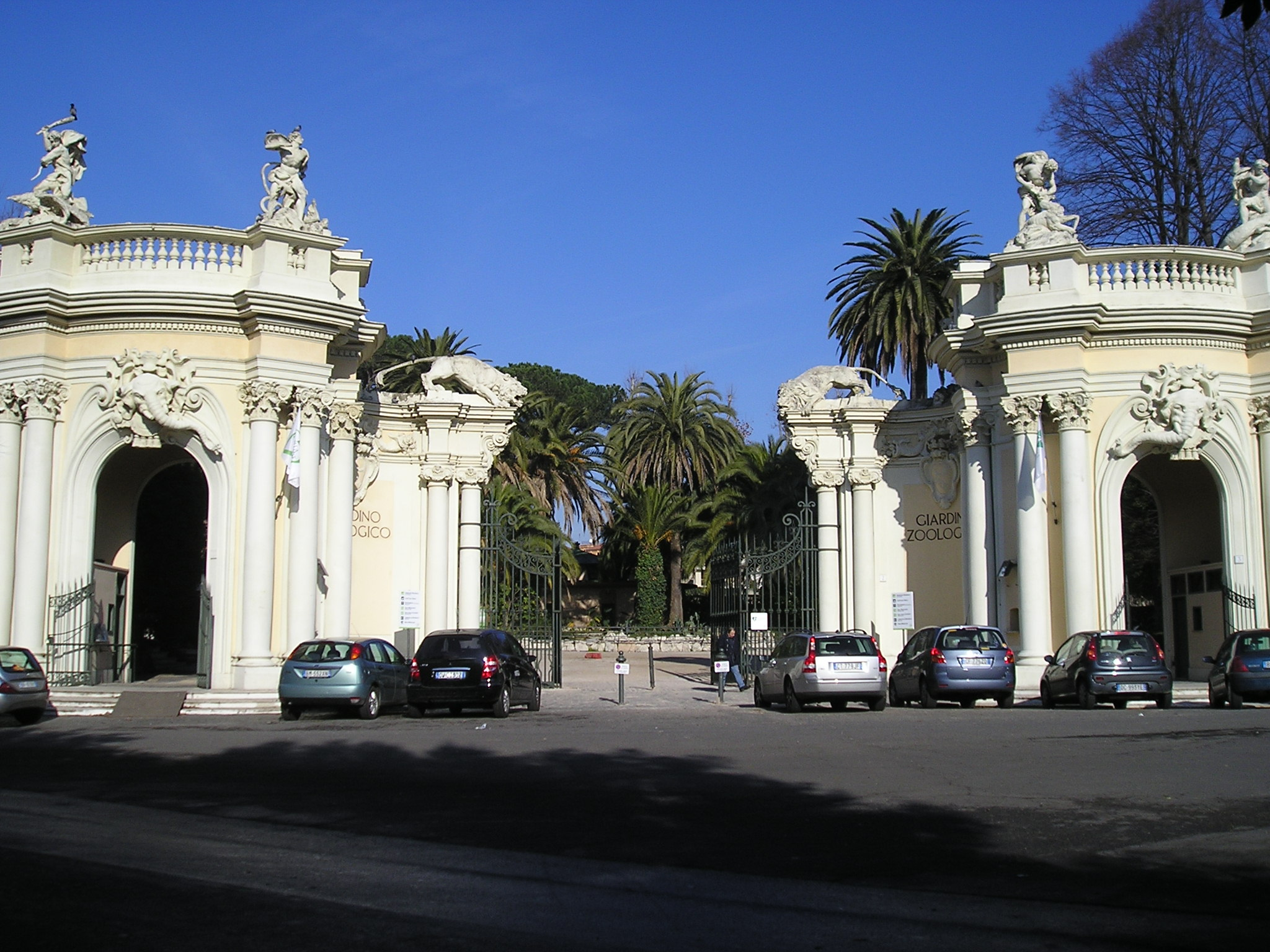
The entrance on Viale del Giardino Zoologico, 1. Inside Villa Borghese.

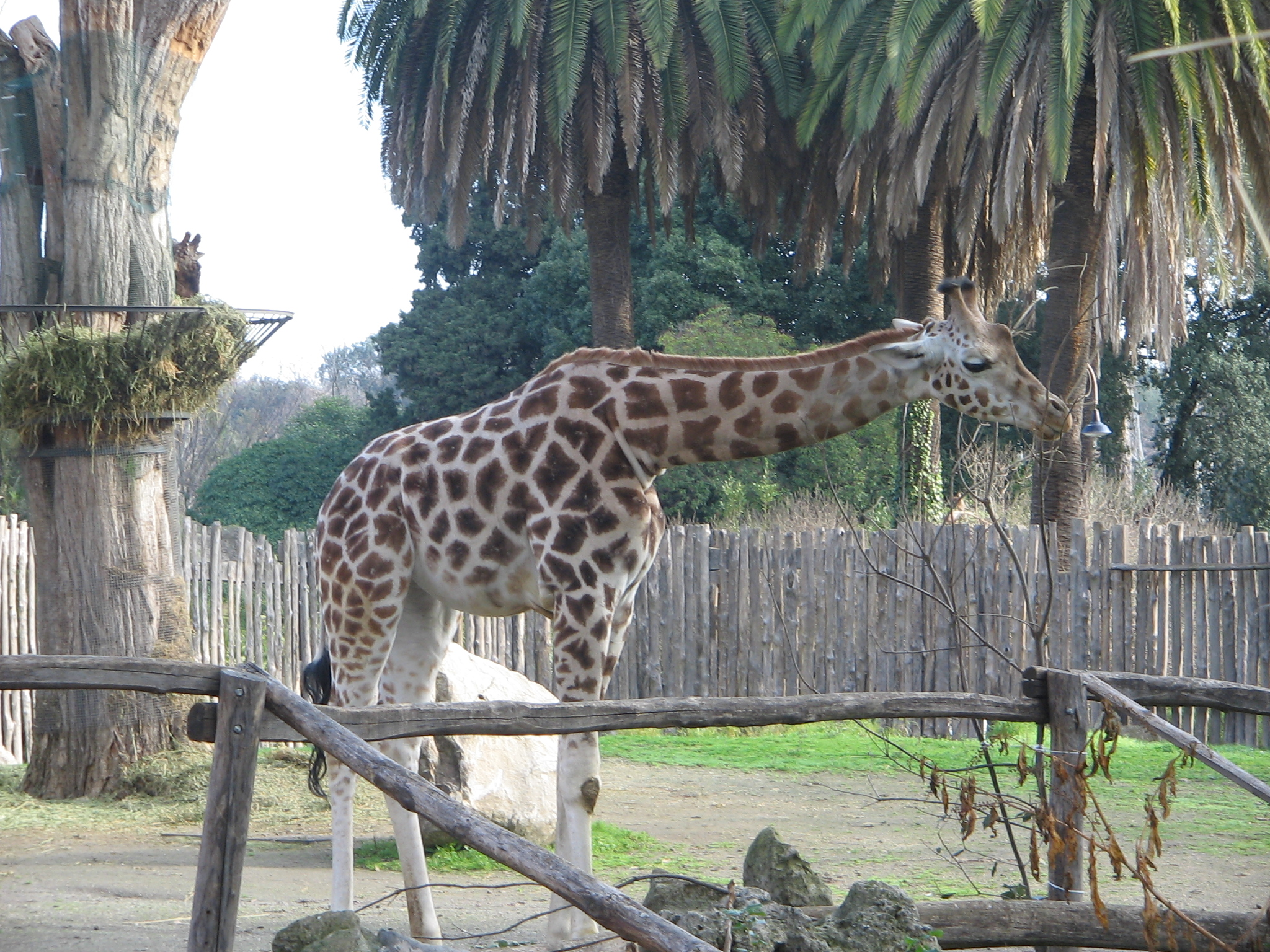
Giraffe

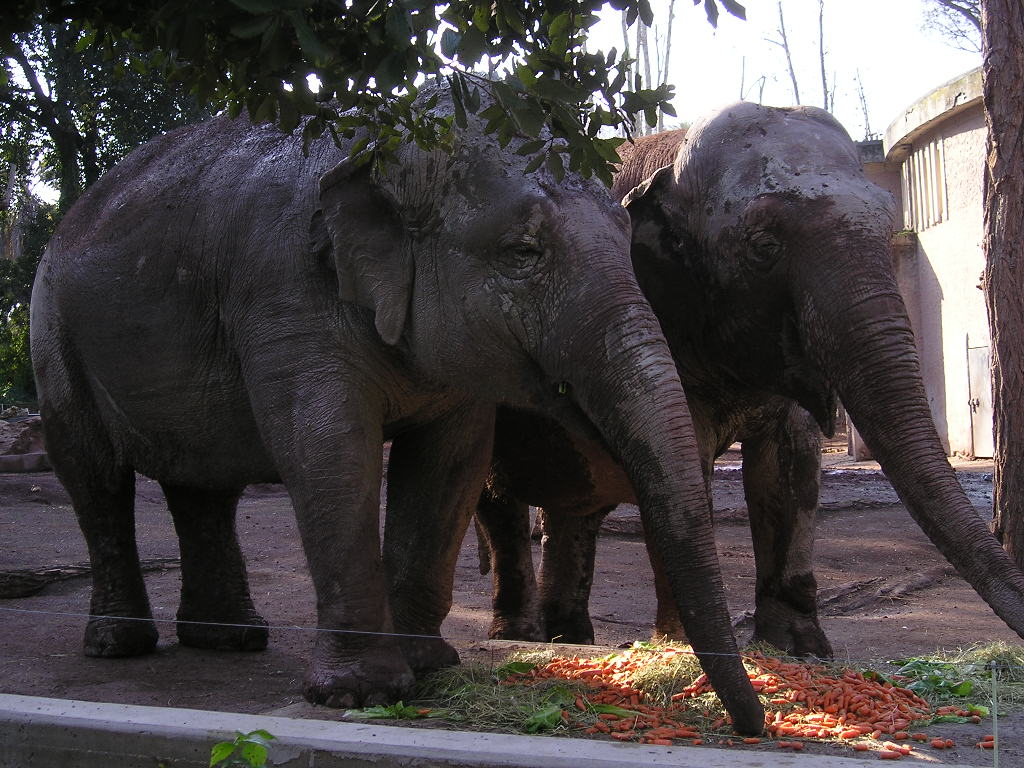
Indian elephants

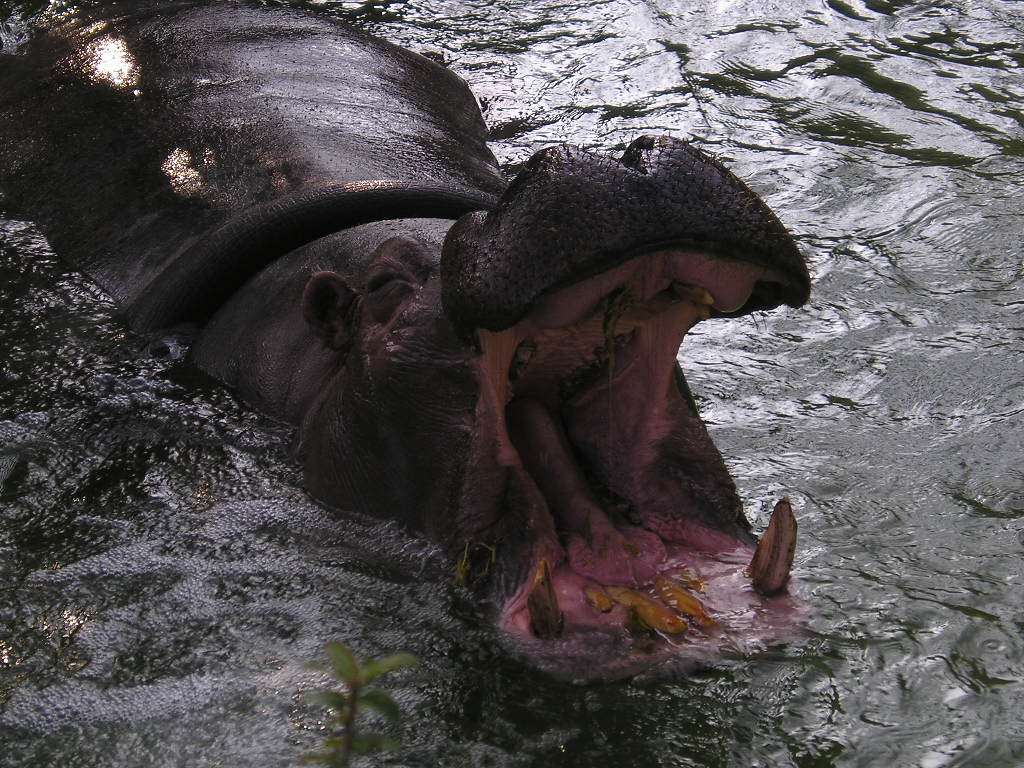
Hippopotamus

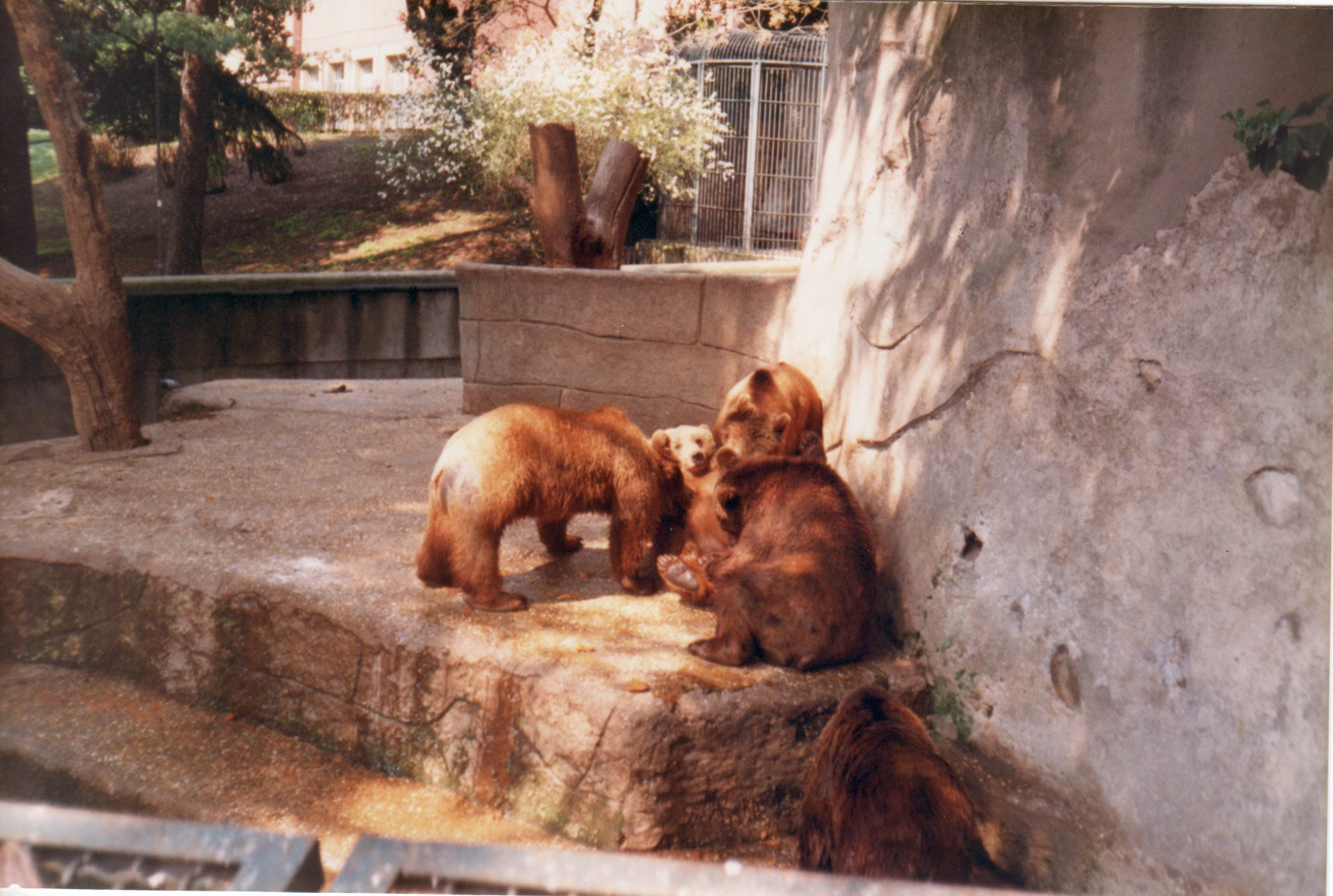
Brown bears

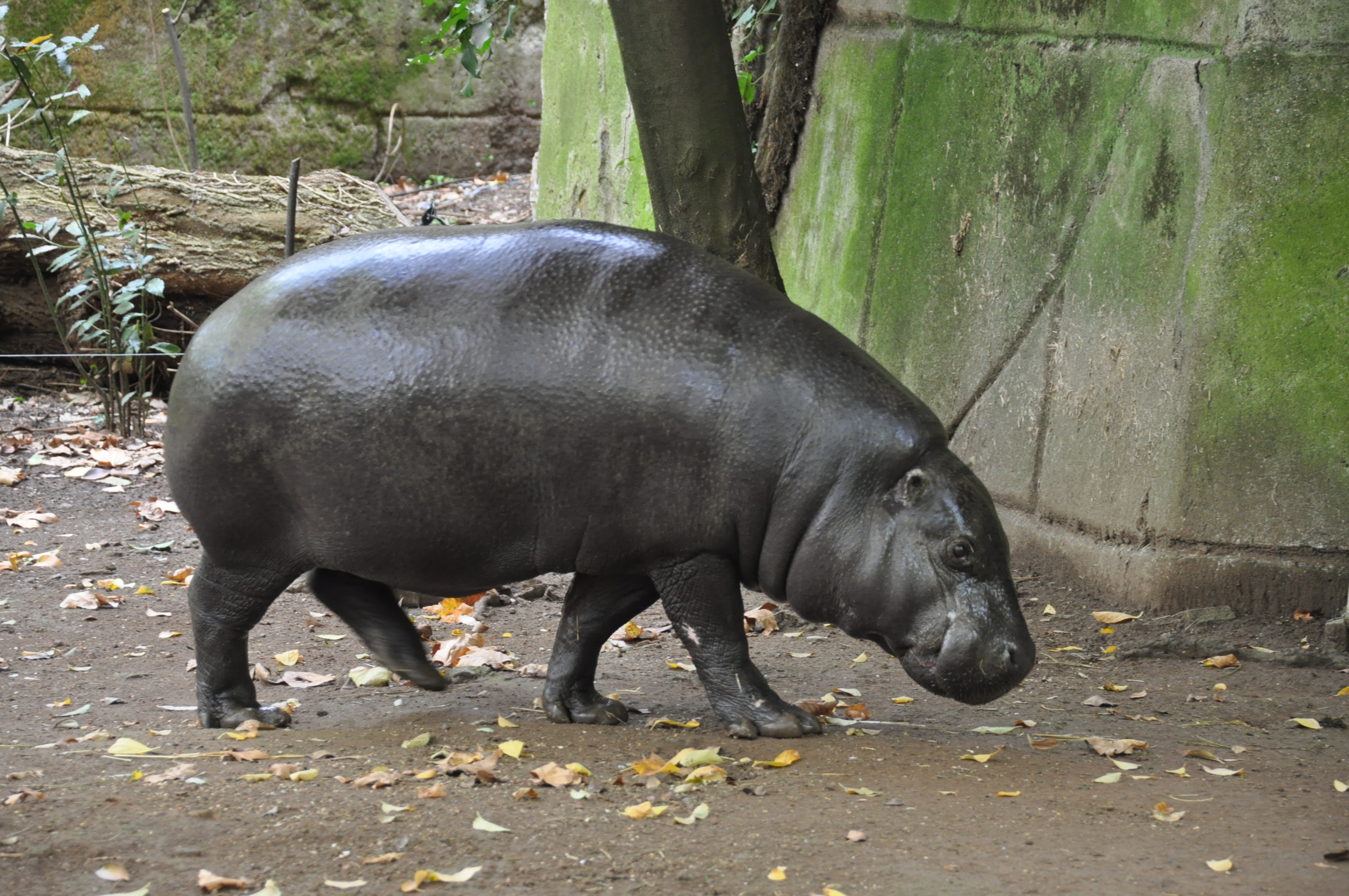
Pygmy hippopotamus at Fondazione Bioparco di Roma on zooinstitutes.com

== Notes ==
Preceded by Via Veneto	Landmarks of Rome; Bioparco di Roma	Succeeded by Villa Ada
