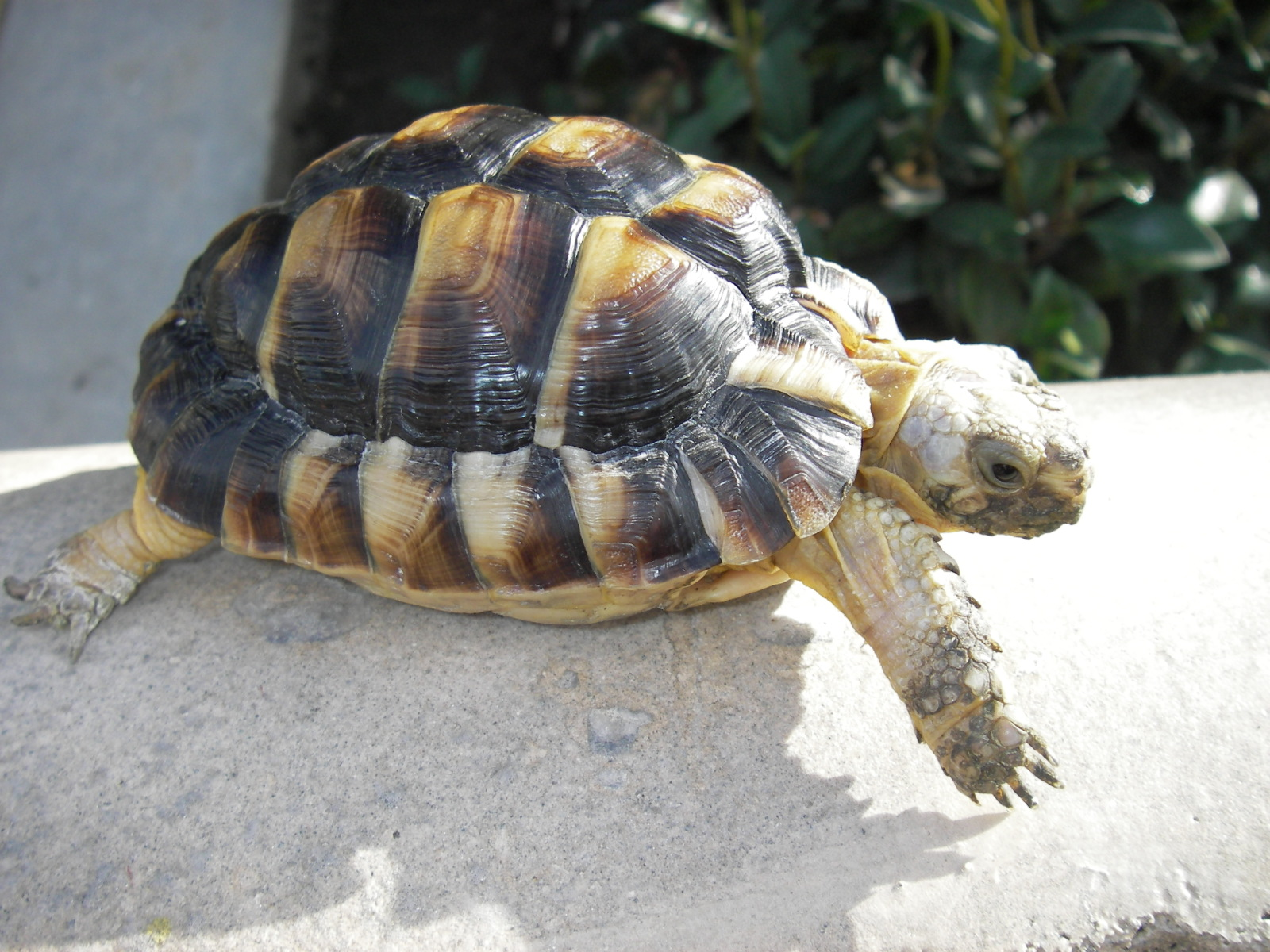
- Five-year-old specimen of Kleinmann's tortoise

Conservation status
- Critically Endangered (IUCN 3.1)
- CITES Appendix I

Scientific classification
- Kingdom: Animalia
- Phylum: Chordata
- Class: Reptilia
- Order: Testudines
- Suborder: Cryptodira
- Family: Testudinidae
- Genus: Testudo
- Species: T. kleinmanni

Binomial name
- Testudo kleinmanni Lortet, 1883
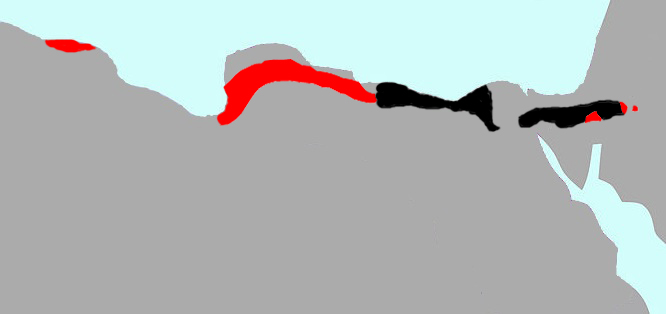
- Range map of the Egyptian tortoise; red color indicates remaining range, and black indicates extinct range

Synonyms
- Testudo leithii Günther, 1869; Peltastes leithii (Günther, 1869); Testudo kleinmanni Lortet, 1883; Medaestia leithi (Günther, 1869) (ex errore); Testudo leithi (Günther, 1869) (ex errore); Pseudotestudo kleinmanni (Lortet, 1883); Testudo kleinmanii (Lortet, 1883) (ex errore); Testudo werneri Perälä, 2001

= Kleinmann's tortoise =

Species of tortoise

Kleinmann's tortoise (Testudo kleinmanni), also called commonly the Egyptian tortoise, Leith's tortoise, and the Negev tortoise, is a critically endangered species of cryptodire turtle in the family Testudinidae. The species is native to Libya and possibly extinct in Egypt. The species was once more widespread, but its numbers are now dwindling, and complete extinction in the wild is a looming threat unless more actions are taken to protect this species.

== Etymology ==
The specific name, kleinmanni, is in honor of Edouard Kleinmann, a French stockbroker who collected the holotype in 1875.

The specific name, werneri (of the synonym Testudo werneri), is in honor of Israeli herpetologist Yehudah L. Werner.

== Description ==
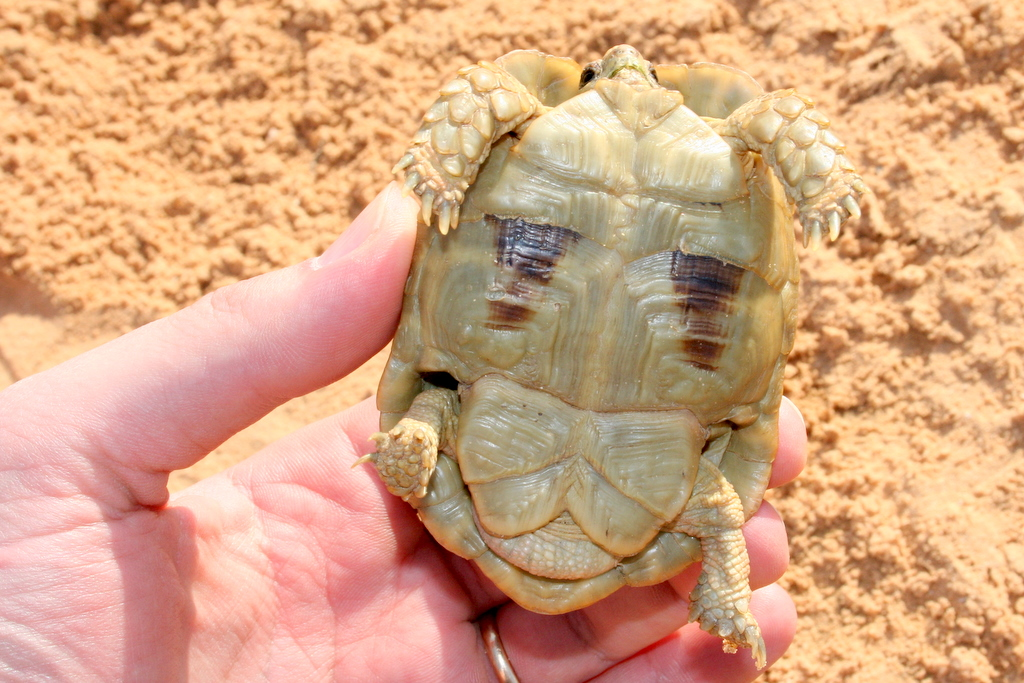
Belly of the Egyptian tortoise

Kleinmann's tortoise is the smallest tortoise in the Northern Hemisphere. Females are larger than males; males are more slender and have a longer tail.

The carapace has a high dome, and ranges in color from ivory to pale gold to dark brown to pink or dull yellow. This allows the paler tortoise to stay in the desert heat for longer. It is also an effective camouflage in the desert. The plastron is light yellow, often with two dark triangles on each abdominal scute. The plastral scutes have dark edgings that fade with age.

The head and limbs are a very pale ivory-yellow to yellowish-brown colour.

== Systematics ==
The proposed subgenus Pseudotestudo is invalid, based on immature characters. It has been proposed to unite this species with the marginated tortoise in the genus Chersus. These clearly share a common ancestor with the common tortoise (Greek tortoise). The former two are somewhat more similar to each other than to the Greek tortoise regarding DNA sequence data. Considering biogeography, however, this is either due to (rather unlikely) dispersal across the Mediterranean, or the supposed "clade" is invalid and the similarity due to convergent evolution.

=== Negev tortoise ===
The Negev subpopulation had been separated as a distinct species, "Negev tortoise" (Testudo werneri), as it did not appear to have distinct or strongly reduced haplotype diversity, consistent with the recent extinction of the Egyptian population and slow DNA sequence evolution rates in Testudo. Baha el Din (2006) synonymized T. werneri due to lacking mtDNA differences between T. kleinmanni from western Libya compared to tortoises from the Negev Desert. In the 2017 checklist of turtles of the world, it remained a synonym.

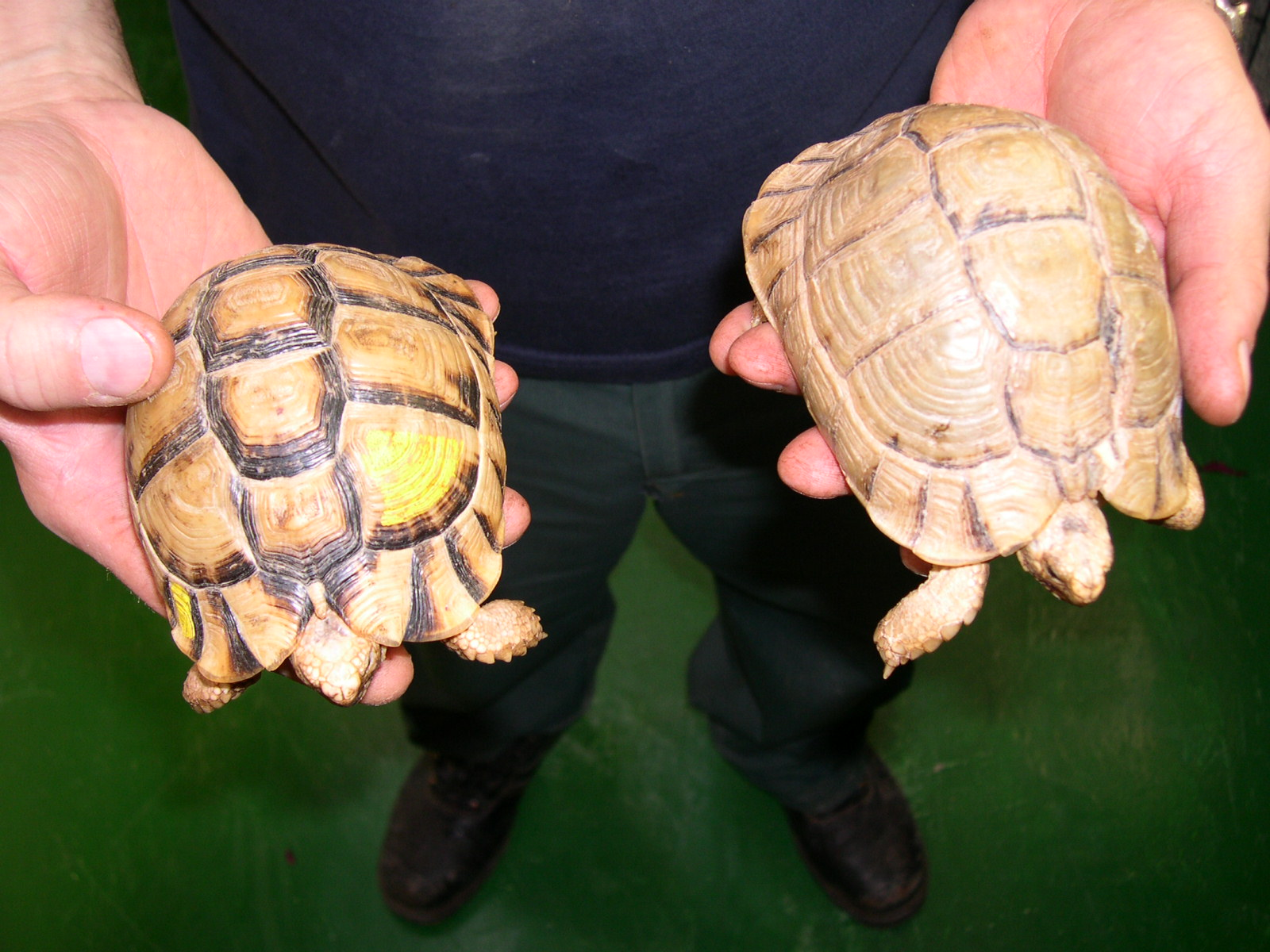
Characteristic specimens of the Egyptian tortoise (left) and Negev tortoise (right), dorsal view

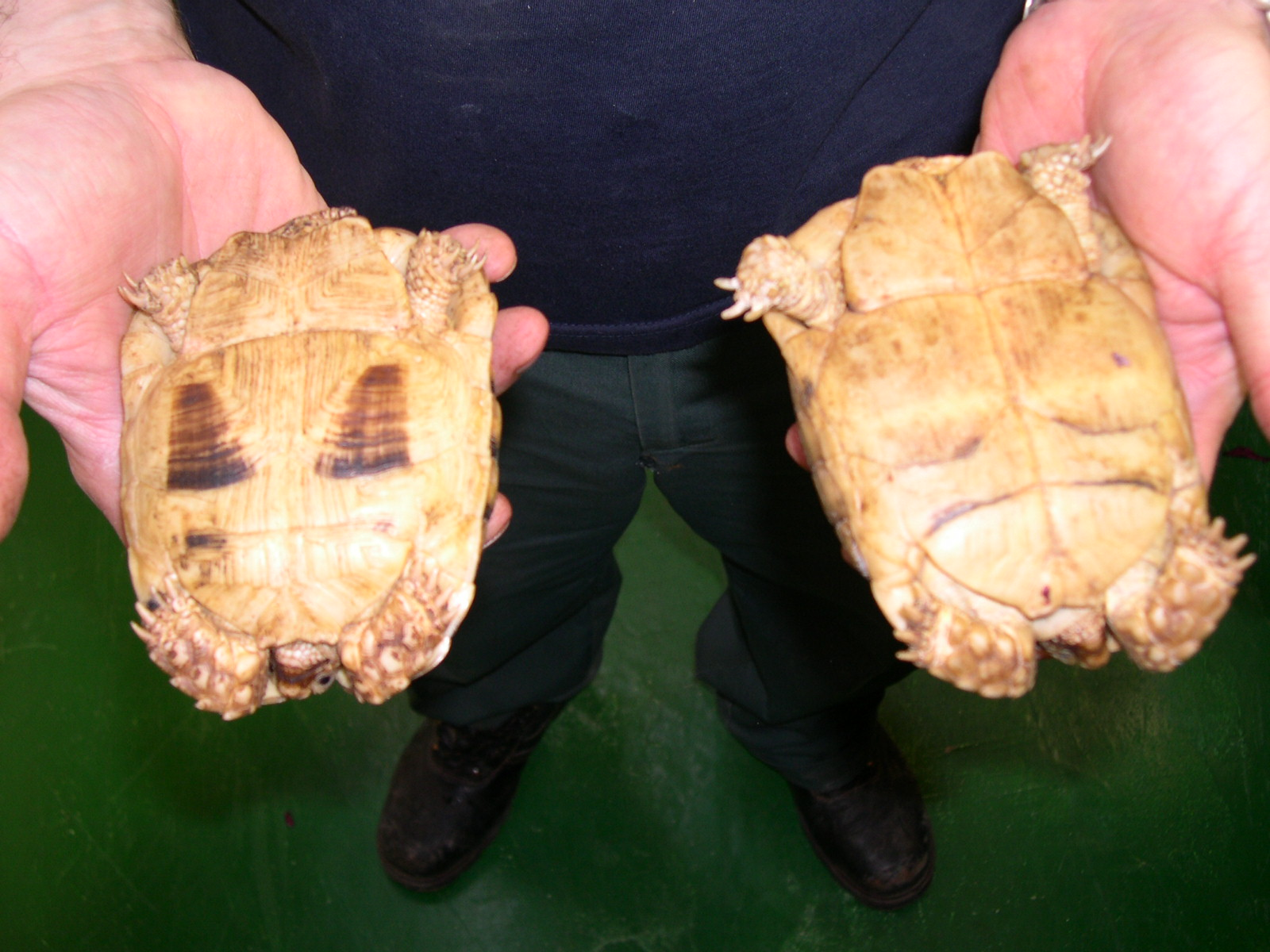
Ventral view: Differences are slight and unreliable (see above)

== Habitat and ecology ==
Kleinmann's tortoise lives in deserts and semiarid habitats, usually with compact sand and gravel plains, scattered rocks, shallow, sandy wadis, dry woodlands, shrubby areas, and coastal salt marsh habitats. In captivity, it eats grasses, fruits, and vegetables, but the diet of T. kleinmanni in the wild is unknown. Kleinmann's tortoise tend to live in habitats that receive less than 50 mm of rain every year. These habitats tend to be countries with expansive desert areas such as Egypt and Libya.

It is least active when the weather is very cold or very hot. During the colder months, it is out most during midday. During the warm season, it is active in the mornings and evenings. The rest of the day is spent under bushes or in rodent burrows.

== Reproduction ==
Kleinmann's tortoise becomes sexually mature when about 5 years old. In the wild, mating has only been observed in March, but in captivity, it mates in April and August to November. During courtship, the male will ram the female, sometimes chasing after her. Unlike any other Mediterranean tortoise, T. kleinmanni may make a mating call similar to the call of the mourning dove. Eggs are laid in shallow bowls beneath bushes, or in vacant burrows. Each clutch contains one to five eggs, which hatch in the summer or early autumn.

== Status and conservation ==
Once found in Egypt, Libya and Israel, the habitat of T. kleinmanni in Egypt has been all but destroyed, and the Egyptian tortoise is close to complete extinction there; in 2006, only 10 wild individuals were known from the vicinity of Lake Bardawil. Two populations can still be found in Libya, but much of the coastline habitat has been destroyed because of human activity. Habitat loss and the illegal pet trade are huge issues facing the species; it is also hunted locally for use in folk medicine. The population is still on the decline, and the risk of extinction in the wild is very real if habitat degradation and illegal trade continue at their present rate. In Israel, T. kleinmanni (previously known as T. werneri) populations are known from northwestern Negev and the Yemin Plain, with lone individuals occasionally found near Yeruham. It is protected by law and several conservation programs, such as the establishment of new protected areas, but is still highly threatened by the conversion of habitat to agricultural fields, extensive animal herding, and the approval of new developments on the sand dunes of the western Negev. In 2010, the population in Israel was estimated at less than 2,000 individuals.

On the IUCN Red List, Kleinmann's tortoise is classified as critically endangered (CR A2abcd+3d). Less than three Testudo generations ago, an estimated 55–56,000 adult Kleinmann's tortoises existed. Today, about 7,500 remain, and decline due to habitat destruction and unsustainable exploitation appears to be ongoing. While the former threat is believed to be alleviated, illegal pet trade is feared to have reduced the population to maybe 1,000 adult tortoises in the two or three remaining subpopulations. Given that T. kleinmanni is a slow-maturing, long-lived species with few offspring (see K-strategist), this is well possibly less than the minimum viable population size, eventually dooming the species to extinction in the wild. There are plans for augmenting the Israeli sub-population by releasing individuals from local controlled breeding centers in Israel, but these projects have yet to be approved by authorities.

Mixing individuals from the subpopulations for reintroduction purposes should be avoided, as the ecological parameters of habitat differ. DNA fingerprinting of individuals to help maintain heterozygosity in captive and reintroduction populations can be performed during routine stool analyses. In this context, notably, there may be a haplotype uniquely found in the Egyptian tortoise.

Captive breeding requires more care than in other Testudo species, as the species is more delicate and the clutch is very small, but is not highly difficult for experienced Testudo breeders. T. kleinmanni is not generally available for hobbyists and even if legal to keep, should be avoided without valid documentation. Smuggling continues to be a problem, but confiscated individuals are used to establish a captive safeguard population.

On May 21, 2007, Rome's main zoo, Bioparco, reported it has successfully bred the species from parents rescued from a smuggler's suitcase in 2005. It is also kept and bred at several other zoos in Europe and North America.

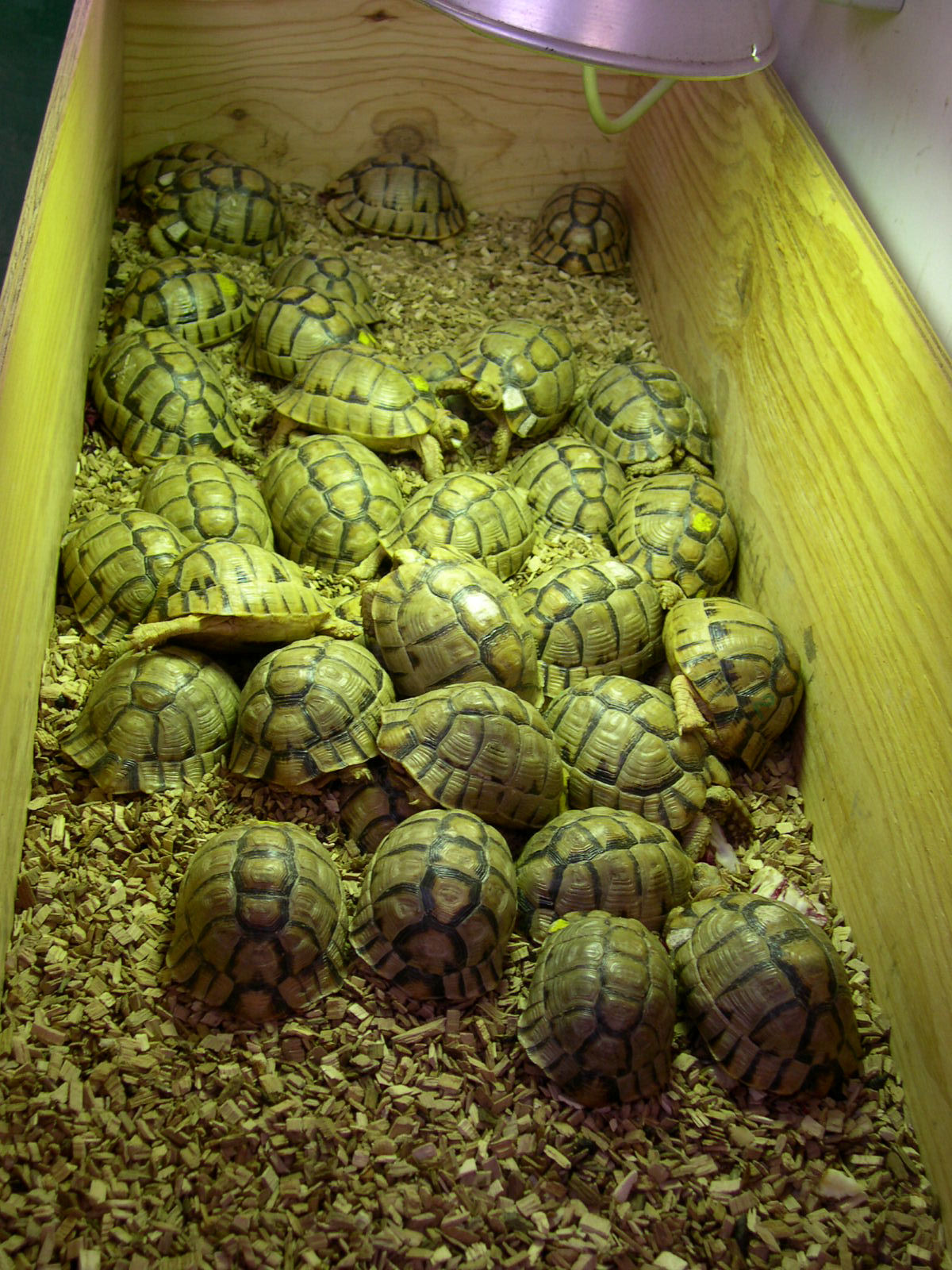
Intercepted shipment of Kleinmann's tortoise from Libya for the illegal pet market, port of Genoa, 2005.

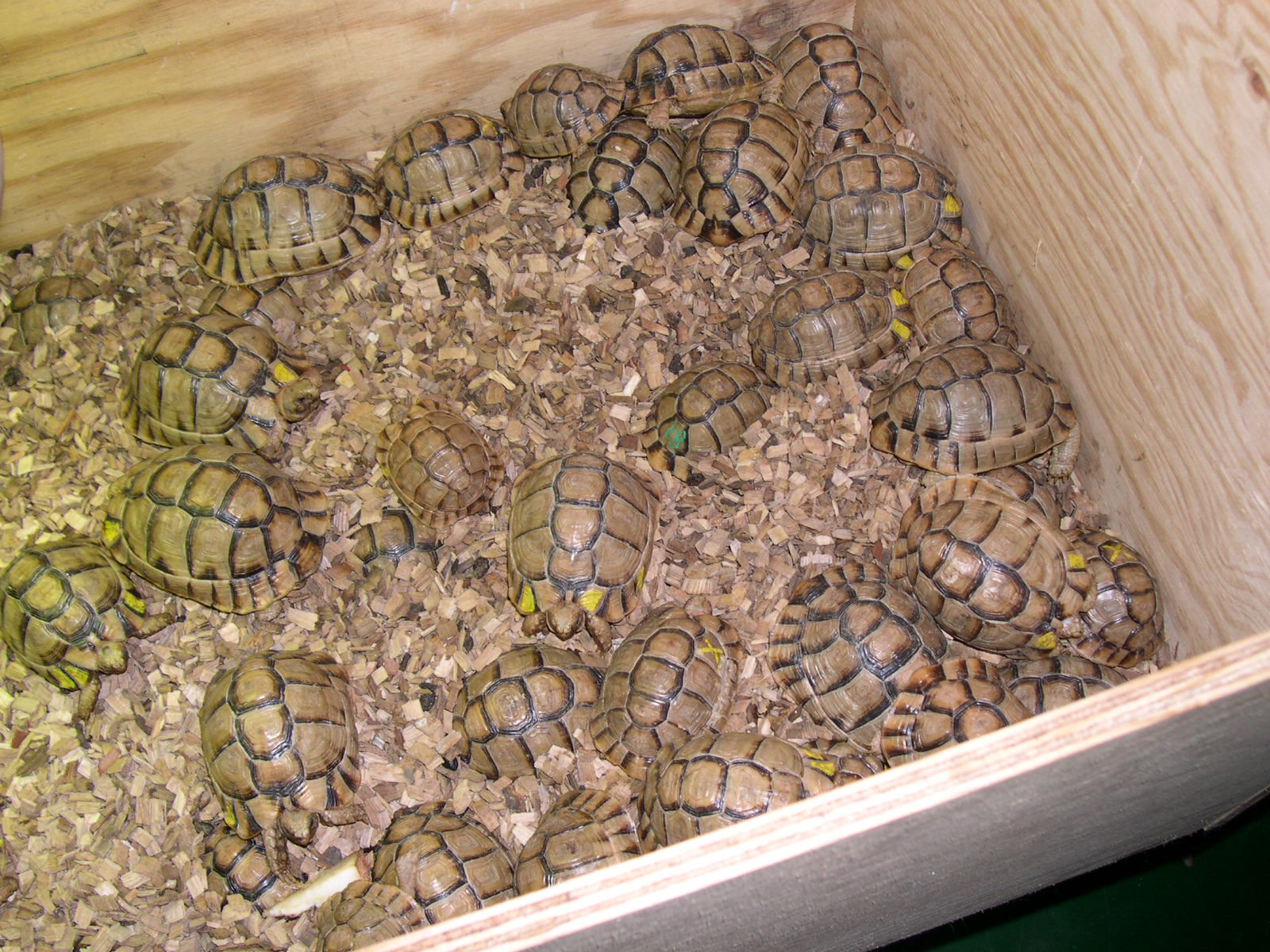
T. kleinmanni now in Bioparco: Smuggling conditions are typically worse.

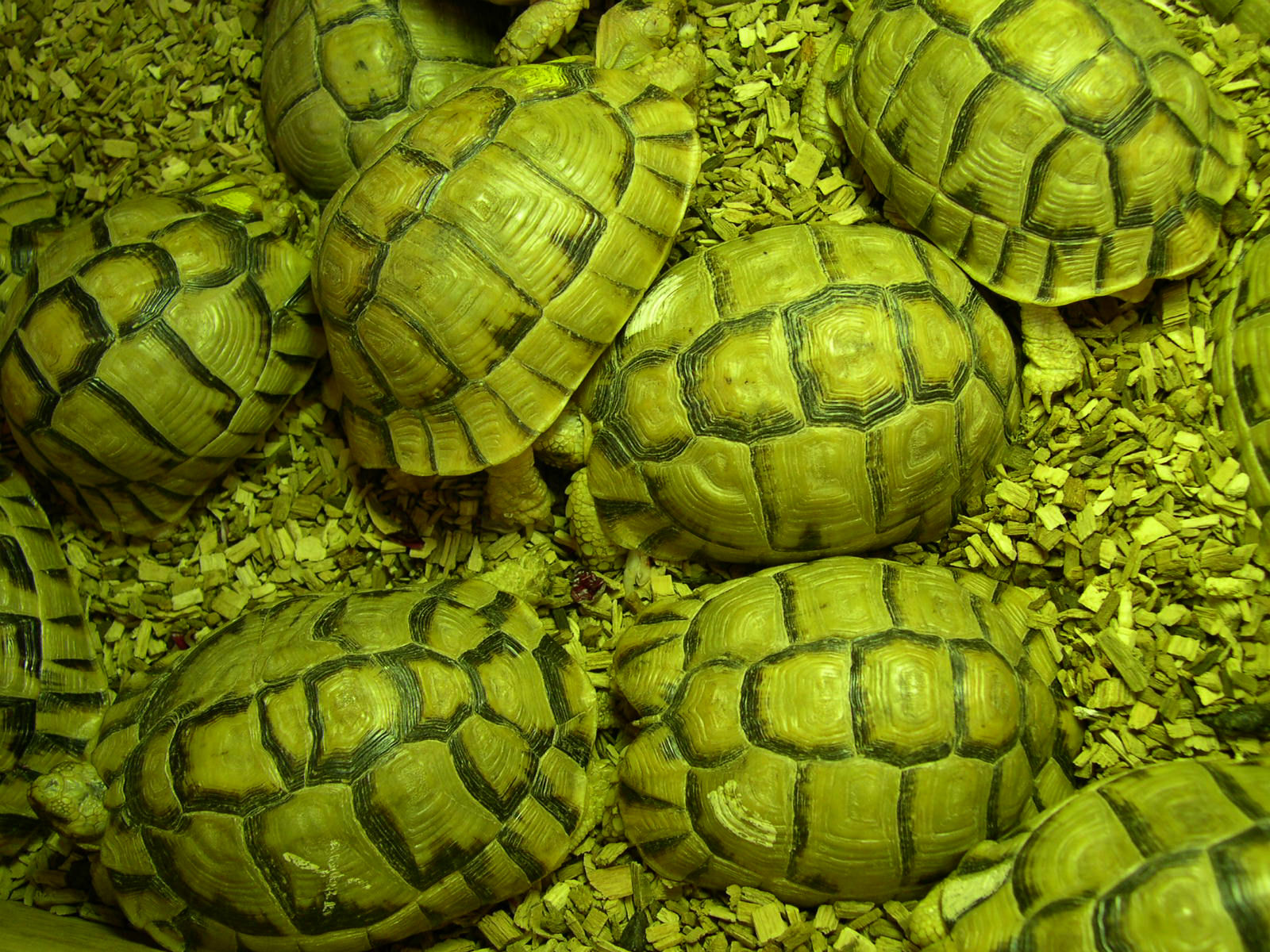
T. kleinmanni from Libya.

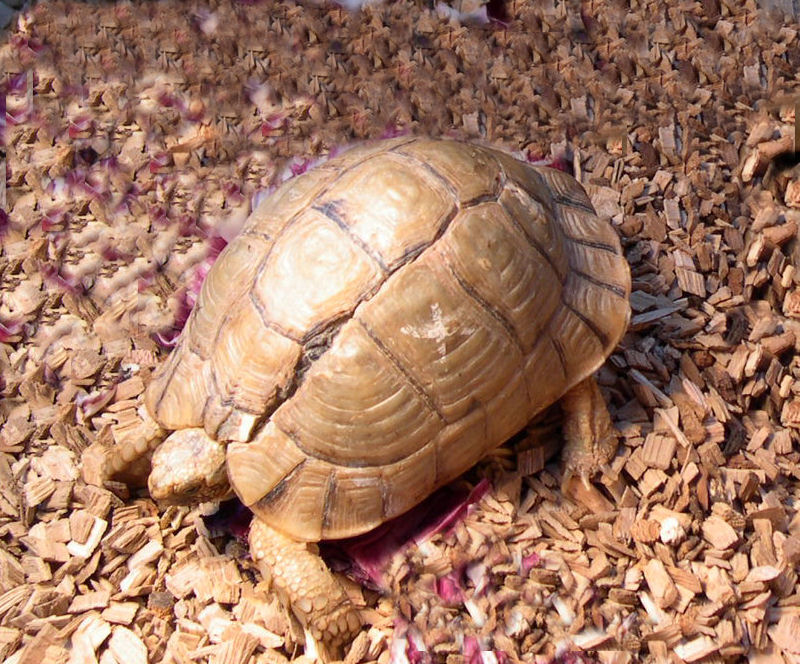
Kleinmann's tortoise, carapace fractured during smuggling.

== Threats ==
Kleinmann's tortoise confronts a range of anthropogenic challenges affecting its conservation. These threats include agricultural practices, overgrazing, industrial development, and, notably, the illegal pet trade. The species suffered a substantial setback when Egyptian subpopulations faced extinction, leading to the utilization of the Libyan stock in both national and international pet markets, a practice that eventually became illegal.

Kleinmann's tortoise encounters threats from agricultural activities, overgrazing, and industrial development. These pressures contribute to habitat degradation, posing challenges to the species' survival and exacerbating its vulnerability.

A critical concern for Kleinmann's tortoise is the illegal pet trade, which originated with the use of Libyan stock after Egyptian subpopulations were depleted. The illicit trade persists within Egypt and Libya. This trade has potentially devastating consequences for the global population, with collection pressure reported to be higher in the eastern regions.

Kleinmann's tortoise faces heightened vulnerability due to its low annual biomass production, resulting in a high sensitivity to population disturbance. The species exhibits poor recovery abilities from activities impacting the population size negatively.
