= Oullins =

Commune in Lyon, France

- Part of Oullins-Pierre-Bénite
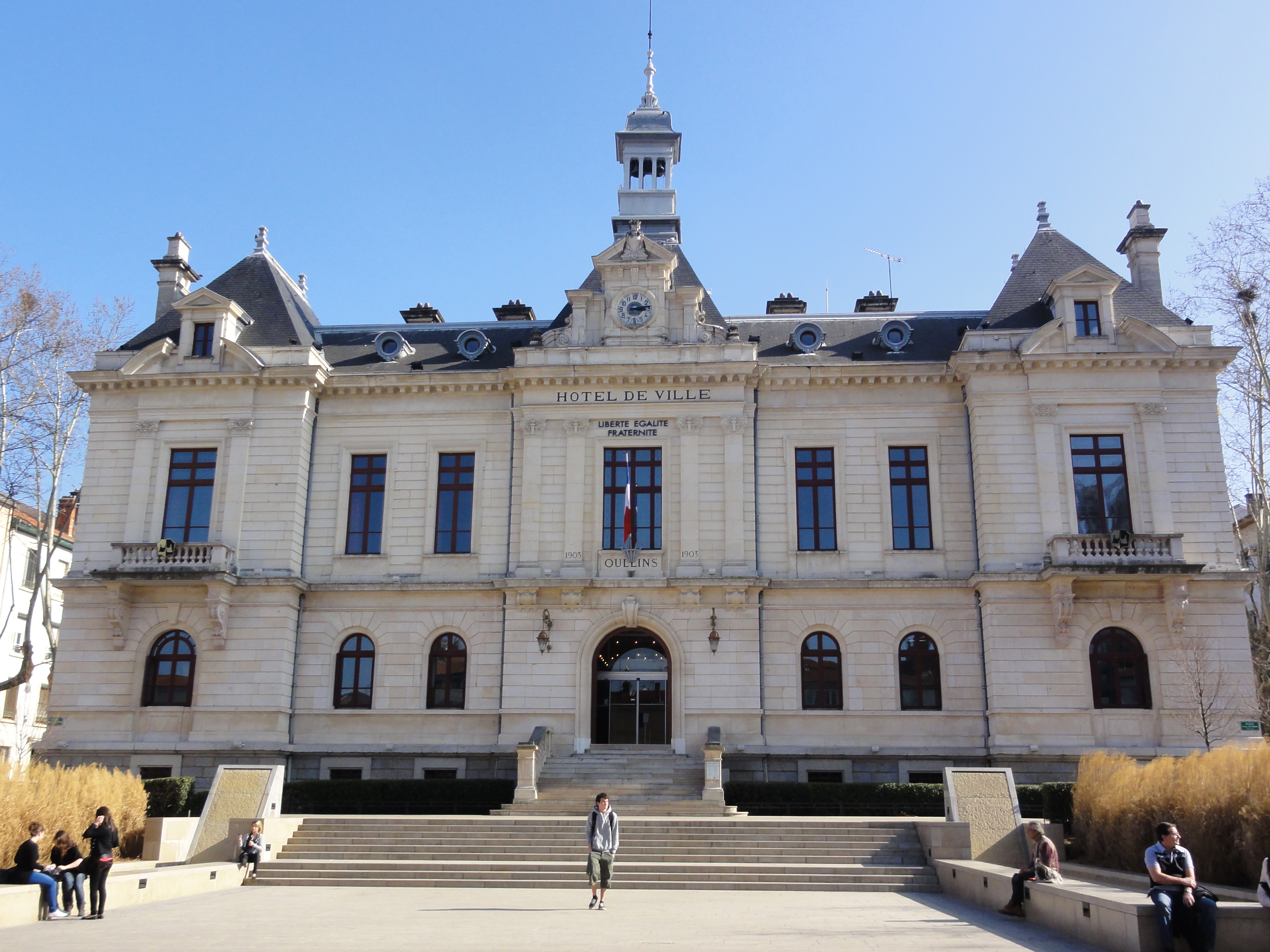
- The Hôtel de Ville

- Coat of arms
- Location of Oullins
- Location within France Location within Auvergne-Rhône-Alpes
- Coordinates: 45°42′54″N 4°48′30″E
- Country: France
- Region: Auvergne-Rhône-Alpes
- Metropolis: Lyon Metropolis
- Arrondissement: Lyon
- Commune: Oullins-Pierre-Bénite
- Area^{1}: 4.4 km^{2} (1.7 sq mi)
- Elevation: 178 m (584 ft)
- Highest elevation: 253 m (830 ft)
- Lowest elevation: 163 m (535 ft)
- Population (2022): 27,343
  - Density: 6,200/km^{2} (16,000/sq mi)
- Demonym: Oullinois
- Time zone: UTC+01:00 (CET)
  - Summer (DST): UTC+02:00 (CEST)
- Postal code: 69600
- ^{1} French Land Register data, which excludes lakes, ponds, glaciers > 1 km^{2} (0.386 sq mi or 247 acres) and river estuaries.

Oullins (French pronunciation: [ulɛ̃]) is a former commune in the Metropolis of Lyon in the Auvergne-Rhône-Alpes region in central-eastern France. A suburb of the city of Lyon, it is adjacent to it to the southwest, on the right bank of the Rhône.

On 1 January 2024, Oullins merged with Pierre-Bénite to form the new commune of Oullins-Pierre-Bénite.

== History ==
The Hôtel de Ville was completed in 1903.

== Population ==
Historical population

Year	Pop.	±% p.a.
1793	2,000	—
1800	1,761	−1.80%
1806	1,851	+0.83%
1821	1,852	+0.00%
1831	2,315	+2.26%
1836	2,944	+4.92%
1841	3,315	+2.40%
1846	3,319	+0.02%
1851	3,616	+1.73%
1856	5,703	+9.54%
1861	6,584	+2.91%
1866	7,010	+1.26%
1872	5,126	−5.08%
1876	5,674	+2.57%
1881	7,536	+5.84%
1886	7,189	−0.94%
1891	8,327	+2.98%
1896	9,085	+1.76%

Year	Pop.	±% p.a.
1901	9,343	+0.56%
1906	10,284	+1.94%
1911	12,243	+3.55%
1921	14,089	+1.41%
1926	15,238	+1.58%
1931	16,652	+1.79%
1936	16,734	+0.10%
1946	18,300	+0.90%
1954	19,224	+0.62%
1962	24,356	+3.00%
1968	26,604	+1.48%
1975	27,772	+0.62%
1982	27,168	−0.31%
1990	26,129	−0.49%
1999	25,183	−0.41%
2007	25,605	+0.21%
2012	25,896	+0.23%
2017	26,273	+0.29%

Source: EHESS and INSEE (1968-2017)

== Transport ==
- Several Buses (C7, C10, 8, 12, 14, 17, 63, 88)
- Subway Line B in December 2013.
- Oullins station, which is part of the TER Auvergne-Rhône-Alpes rail network

== Notable people ==
- Jean-Bryan Boukaka, footballer
- Barbara Buatois, cyclist
- Georges Charpy (1865–1945)
- Patrice Garande, footballer
- Sabrina Palie, basketball athlete
- Joseph Marie Jacquard
- Clémence Lortet, naturalist, botanist
- Louis Charles Émile Lortet, physician, botanist, zoologist and Egyptologist.
- Lionel Bah, professional football player
- Féthi Harek, professional football player
- Patrick de Gayardon, skydiver
- Charles Le Gendre, American Civil War general & first foreign advisor in Japan
- Dora Jemaa-Amirouche, Athlete(400m hurdles)
- Clément Turpin, football referee
- Olivier Panis, racing driver
- Jean-Louis Ubaud, politician

== Twin towns ==
- Nürtingen, Germany, since 1962
- Pescia, Italy, since 1994

== See also ==
- Communes of the Metropolis of Lyon
