= Georges Roffavier =

French botanist (1775-1866)

Georges Roffavier (17 September 1775, in Lyon – 12 March 1866, in Lyon) was a French botanist.

In 1806 he studied botany under Jean-Emmanuel Gilibert, later taking part in botanical excursions to Grand-Colombier (1817), Mont-Cenis (1826) and Chamonix (1830). In 1830 he was named interim manager of the botanical garden at Lyon.

With Nicolas Charles Seringe and others, he was a founding member of the Société linnéenne de Lyon, serving as its treasurer from 1822 to 1829. In 1864 he donated his collections, herbarium and library to Dr. Louis Lortet.

Plants with the specific epithet of roffavieri are named in his honor, an example being Rosa roffavieri.

== Publications ==
- "Supplément a`la Flore lyonnaise publiée par J.B. Balbis en 1827 et 1828, ou description des plantes phanérogames et cryptogames découvertes depuis la la publication de cet ouvrage : suivi d'un tableau général contenant la nomenclature méthodique des espéces agames décrites dans la Flore lyonnaise, conjointement avec celles qui ont été trouvées depuis la méme époque dans les environs de Lyon". (with Giovanni Battista Balbis), 1835.
