= Clémence Lortet =

French botanist (1772–1835)

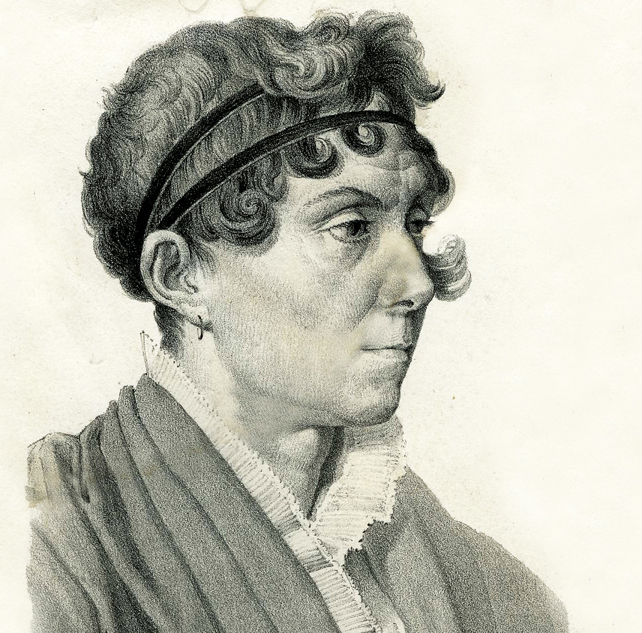
- Born: 17 September 1772; Lyon, France
- Died: 15 April 1835 (aged 62); Oullins, France
- Burial place: Oullins Cemetery
- Occupations: Botanist and naturalist
- Children: Pierre Lortet

Clémence Lortet (17 September 1772 – 15 April 1835) (née Richard) was a French botanist and naturalist. In 1823, she became an associate of the Linnean Society of Paris, and with Giovanni Balbis and others, co-founded the Linnean Society of Lyon.

== Life and work ==
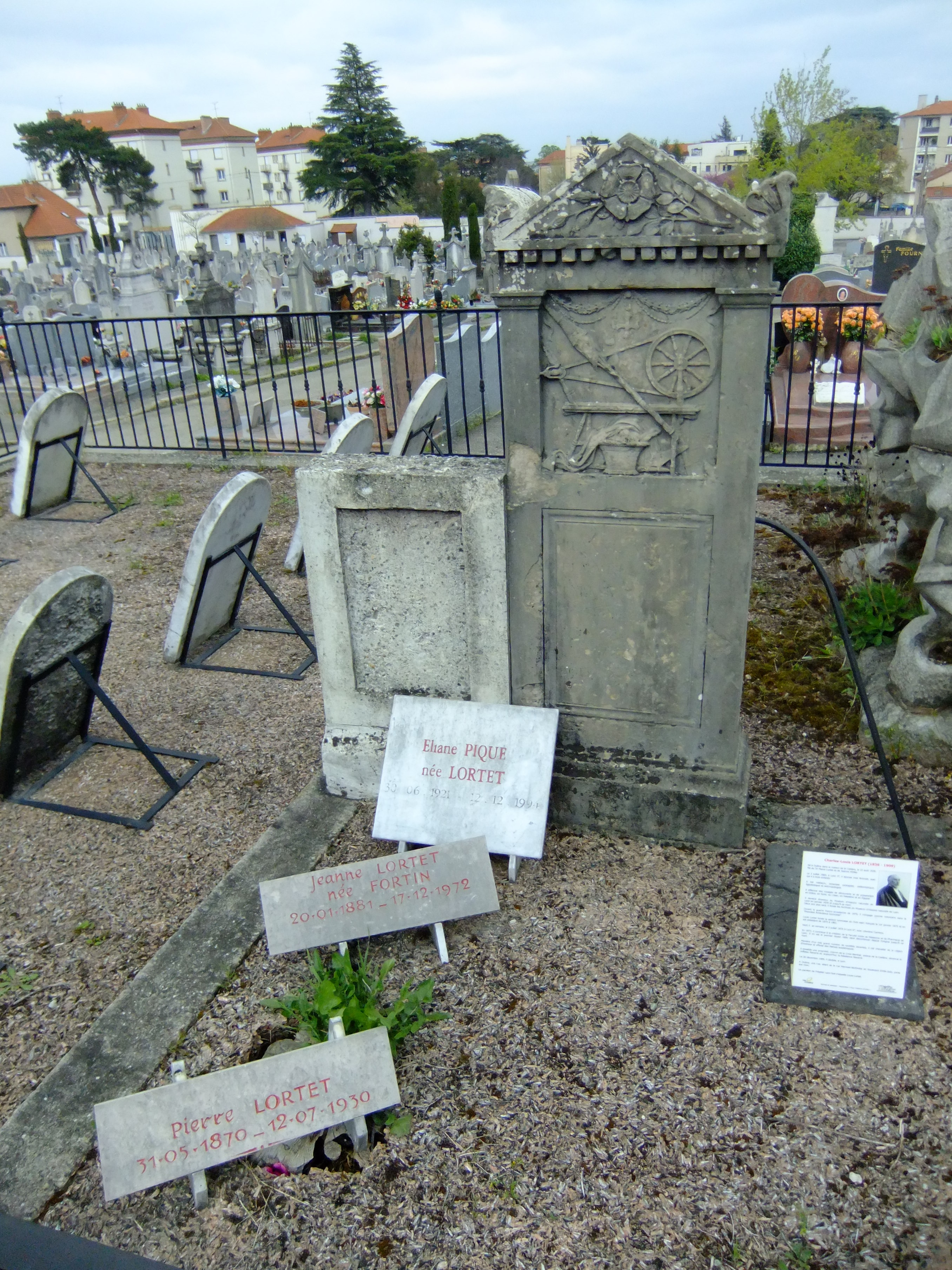
Lortet family burial place, Oullins, Rhône, France

As the daughter of Pierre Richard (1741–1815), silk dyer, and Jeanne Gondret (1750–1826), she was introduced to science very early by her father. In 1791, she married Jean-Pierre Lortet (1756–1823) and they had a son, Pierre Lortet (1792–1868).

During the Siege of Lyon in 1793, when young Pierre was only an infant, Clémence worked hard to treat and save the wounded on both sides of the conflict, both Royalists and Jacobins, at considerable personal risk. In 1803, deeply affected by these events, she consulted the physician Jean-Emmanuel Gilibert, who was also a botanist and designer and director of the Jardin des Plantes de Lyon, who recommended to her: "Exercise your legs and keep your head busy. You have a garden, grow plants in it and come to my botany lessons." A sustained collaboration between the two followed.

In time, Clémence Lortet became a naturalist in mineralogy and botany. In particular, she collaborated with botanists Noël-Antoine Aunier and Georges Roffavier, then with Giovanni Battista Balbis. In 1823, she became a free associate of the Linnaean Society of Paris. She co-founded, with Balbis among others, the Linnaean Society of Lyon. A sustained collaboration followed. Although she did not publish any journal articles in her lifetime, several of her manuscripts are published.

== Family ==
Her son was the physician Pierre Lortet and his son was the physician and botanist Louis Lortet (1836–1909).

== Taxa ==
- L'Hieracium lortetiae (Asteraceae in the Flore lyonnaise) was found in Pilat by Clémence Lortet
- The genus Lortetia Ser., 1847 (Passifloraceae) was created by Nicolas Charles Seringe, in memory of Clémence Lortet

== Honors ==
The municipal library of the 6th arrondissement of Lyon, which is part of the Municipal Library network of Lyon, has borne her name since 2017.
