= Lortet's barbel =

Conservation status
- Data Deficient (IUCN 3.1)

Scientific classification
- Kingdom: Animalia
- Phylum: Chordata
- Class: Actinopterygii
- Order: Cypriniformes
- Family: Cyprinidae
- Subfamily: Barbinae
- Genus: Luciobarbus
- Species: L. lorteti

Binomial name
- Luciobarbus lorteti Sauvage, 1882

Synonyms
- Barbus lorteti Sauvage, 1882

Species of fish

Lortet's barbel (Lucioarbus lorteti) is a species of ray-finned fish in the family Cyprinidae. It is only found in the lower course of Orontes River in Syria and Turkey, which were poisoned and nearly dried in 1989 and changed the lake from being abundant to completely fishless. Aside from being extinct in Lake Amik, nothing else is known about the fish.

Although the patronym is not identified, probably in honor of Louis Charles Émile Lortet (1836-1909).
