= Jean-Louis Ubaud =

French politician

Jean-Louis Ubaud (born 1959 in Oullins) is a French politician, a member of the Socialist Party. He is a municipal and former departmental councillor in Oullins, in the department of Rhône.

== Life ==
Ubaud was born in Oullins in 1959 into a family that migrated there in the 19th century to work for the PLM railway company. He worked in the metal-working industry, first as a technician and then in sales. In addition to his political work, he now works in the town hall at Lyon.

== Political career ==
Ubaud became involved in the Young Socialist Movement while still in school and became the youngest member of the council in 1983. Following the right-wing election victory of 1995, he was in opposition until being elected to the general (departmental) council in 1998. He was re-elected in 2004 and 2011.

In the 2008 municipal elections, he narrowly missed being elected because of votes that went instead to the Communists. After an appeal to the Tribunal Administratif (the lowest level of courts in administrative matters), the election results were validated despite evidence of "irregularity with no proof of intention to defraud". He stood again in the 2013 elections, against François-Noël Buffet.

=== Government service ===
- City councillor for Oullins, elected in 1983, 1989, 1995, 2001, 2007
- Departmental councillor for Rhône, elected in 1998, 2004, 2011
- Administrator at SYTRAL (Syndicat mixte des transports pour le Rhône et l'agglomération lyonnaise) since 2001
