= Lionel Bah =

Ivorian footballer (born 1980)

Personal information
- Date of birth: 2 February 1980 (age 46)
- Place of birth: Oullins, France
- Height: 1.85 m (6 ft 1 in)
- Position: Midfielder

Team information
- Current team: Lyon-La Duchère (manager)

Senior career*
Years	Team	Apps	(Gls)
1999–2000	Louhans-Cuiseaux	1	(0)
2000–2005	Guingamp	37	(4)
2005–2006	Reims	24	(0)
2006–2007	Creteil	22	(0)
2007–2008	Boulogne	17	(1)
2008–2009	APOP Kinyras Peyias	2	(0)
2009	Astra Ploieşti	1	(0)
2009–2012	Louhans-Cuiseaux		
2012–2013	Andrézieux II		

International career
2003–2007	Ivory Coast	2	(0)

Managerial career
- 2013: RWS Bruxelles (caretaker)
- 2014–2016: Feurs (academy)
- 2016–2018: Saint-Priest (academy)
- 2018–2023: Saint-Priest
- 2024: Compiègne
- 2024–: Lyon-La Duchère
- * Club domestic league appearances and goals

Lionel Bah (born 2 February 1980) is a professional football coach and a former midfielder. He is the manager of Championnat National 3 club Lyon-La Duchère. Born in France, he made two appearances for the Ivory Coast national team at international level.

== Career ==
Bah was born in Oullins, Rhône.

In March 2007, he received his first call-up for the Ivory Coast in an African Cup of Nations qualifier against Madagascar, a match played away.

After a successful trial with Astra Ploieşti in January 2009, Bah was signed to a six-month contract with Astra Ploieşti. In June 2009, he helped Astra Ploieşti gain promotion to the Romanian Premier League.
