= Dora Jemaa-Amirouche =

French hurdler (born 1985)

Personal information
- Nationality: French
- Born: 15 July 1985 (age 40) Oullins
- Years active: 2006–2010
- Height: 1.54 m (5 ft 1 in)

Sport
- Event: 400 m hurdles
- Club: AC Paris-Joinville

Dora Jemaa-Amirouche (born 15 July 1985, at Oullins) is a French athlete, who specializes in the 400 hurdles.

== Biography ==
She won two champion of France titles at the 400 meters hurdles, in 2006 and 2010, and she also won national title for the Indoors 400 m in 2008.

=== Prize list ===
- French Championships in Athletics :
  - winner 400 hurdles in 2006 and 2010
- French Indoor athletics Championships:
  - winner of the 400m 2008

=== Records ===
Personal Bests
Event	Performance	Location	Date
400 m hurdles	56.27s	Munich	23 June 2007
