= Sabrina Palie =

French basketball player

Sabrina Palie (born 23 July 1981) is a French basketball player. She was born in Oullins, France.

Palie plays for club Villeneuve D'Ascq Lille Metropole|Villeneuve d'Ascq of the LFB, the top women's basketball league in France. She has played for other teams, including: Challes (France), Napoli BK (Italy), Aix-en-Provence (France), Union Hainaut (France), and Priolo (Italy).

== Biography ==
Pre-selected for the France women's national basketball team in 2005, she played in three games for the French national team, from July 29 against Hungary to July 30, 2005, against Poland. She was selected for a third game on August 15 against China but did not take the court.

In 2009, she began the season as a substitute in Aix-en-Provence, filling in for the injured Claire Tomaszewski, before finishing the season in Naples (10.5 points per game).

In 2006, she played in the WNBA (11 games, averaging 1.0 points) for the Detroit Shock, who won the WNBA championship under head coach Bill Laimbeer. In mid-2012, she retired from professional sports.

She played in Nationale 1 during the 2013–2014 season for the Aulnoye-Aymeries club, which earned promotion to Ligue 2.

In January 2015, she joined Léon Trégor Basket 29. After averaging 16.8 points and 3.8 rebounds in 10 games, she extended her contract for another season in Brittany.

In September 2016, she competed with the French 3x3 national team in the World Championship in China.

For the 2017–2018 season, she left Landerneau Bretagne Basket (formerly Léon Trégor Basket 29) to play for Chalon Basket Club in NF3. She scored 29 points against Caluire on April 28, 2018, in the NF3 playoffs.
