= Oullins-Pierre-Bénite =

- Commune
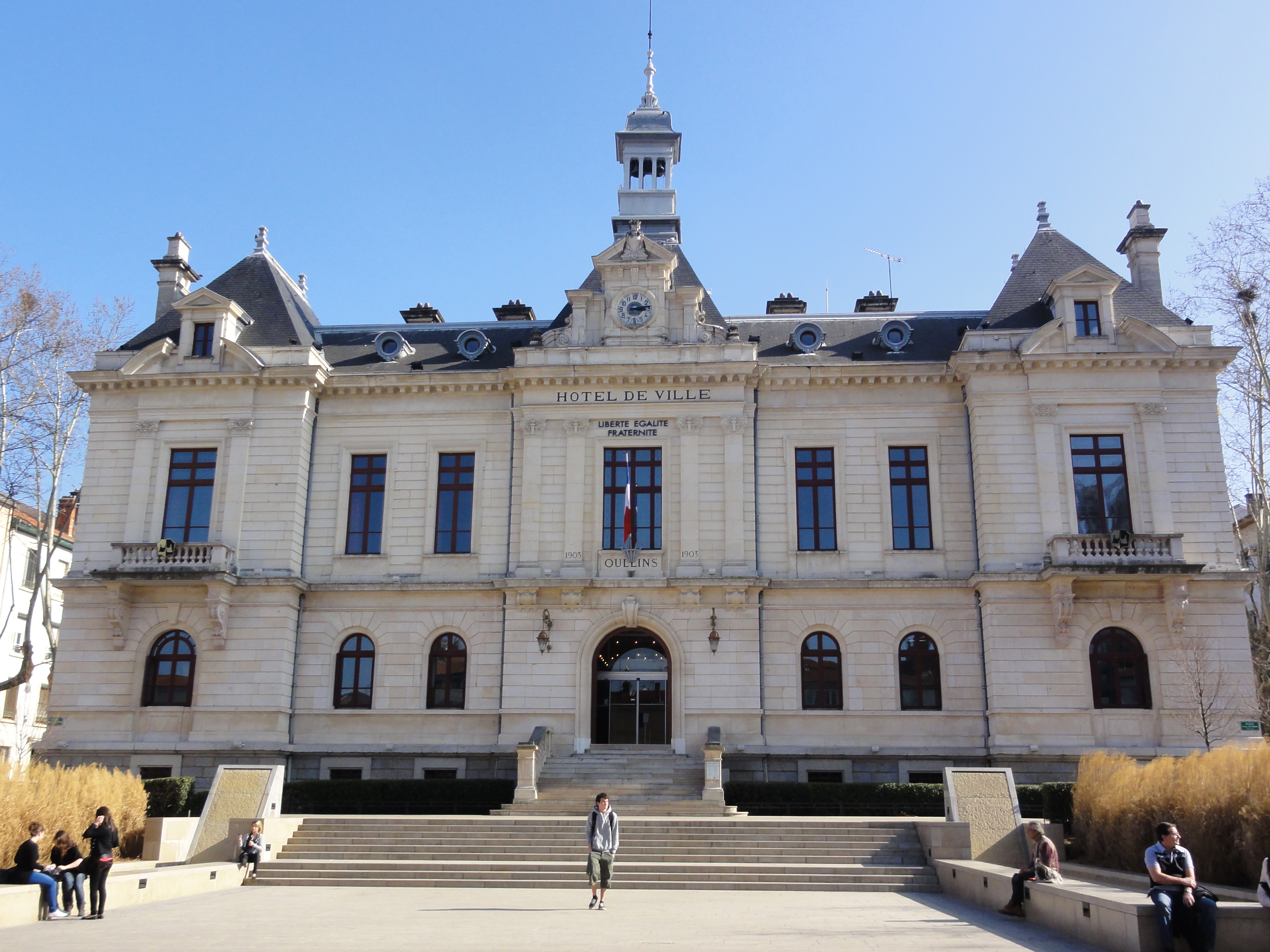
- The Hôtel de Ville

- Coat of arms
- Location of Oullins-Pierre-Bénite
- Location within France Location within Auvergne-Rhône-Alpes
- Coordinates: 45°42′54″N 4°48′30″E
- Country: France
- Region: Auvergne-Rhône-Alpes
- Metropolis: Lyon Metropolis
- Arrondissement: Lyon

Government
  - Mayor (2024–2026): Jérôme Moroge
- Area^{1}: 8.88 km^{2} (3.43 sq mi)
- Highest elevation: 271 m (889 ft)
- Lowest elevation: 155 m (509 ft)
- Population (2023): 38,168
  - Density: 4,300/km^{2} (11,100/sq mi)
- Time zone: UTC+01:00 (CET)
  - Summer (DST): UTC+02:00 (CEST)
- INSEE/Postal code: 69149 /69310, 69600
- Website: https://www.oullins.fr
- ^{1} French Land Register data, which excludes lakes, ponds, glaciers > 1 km^{2} (0.386 sq mi or 247 acres) and river estuaries.

Oullins-Pierre-Bénite (French pronunciation: [ulɛ̃ pjɛʁ benit]) is a commune in the Metropolis of Lyon in Auvergne-Rhône-Alpes region in eastern France. It was established on 1 January 2024, with the merger of the communes of Oullins and Pierre-Bénite.

It is a suburb of the city of Lyon, and is adjacent to it on the southwest.

== History ==
The new municipality was officially established on 1 January 1, 2024 by decree of 12 December 2023, with the transformation of the two old communes into "delegated communes". The Hôtel de Ville, which was formerly the town hall of Oullins, was completed in 1903.

== Population ==
Population data refer to the commune in its geography as of January 2025.

Historical population
Year	Pop.	±% p.a.
1968	34,634	—
1975	37,821	+1.27%
1982	36,636	−0.45%
1990	35,703	−0.32%
1999	35,146	−0.17%
2007	35,558	+0.15%
2012	35,967	+0.23%
2017	36,663	+0.38%
2023	38,168	+0.67%
Source: INSEE
