= Pierre-Bénite =

Commune in Lyon, France

- Part of Oullins-Pierre-Bénite
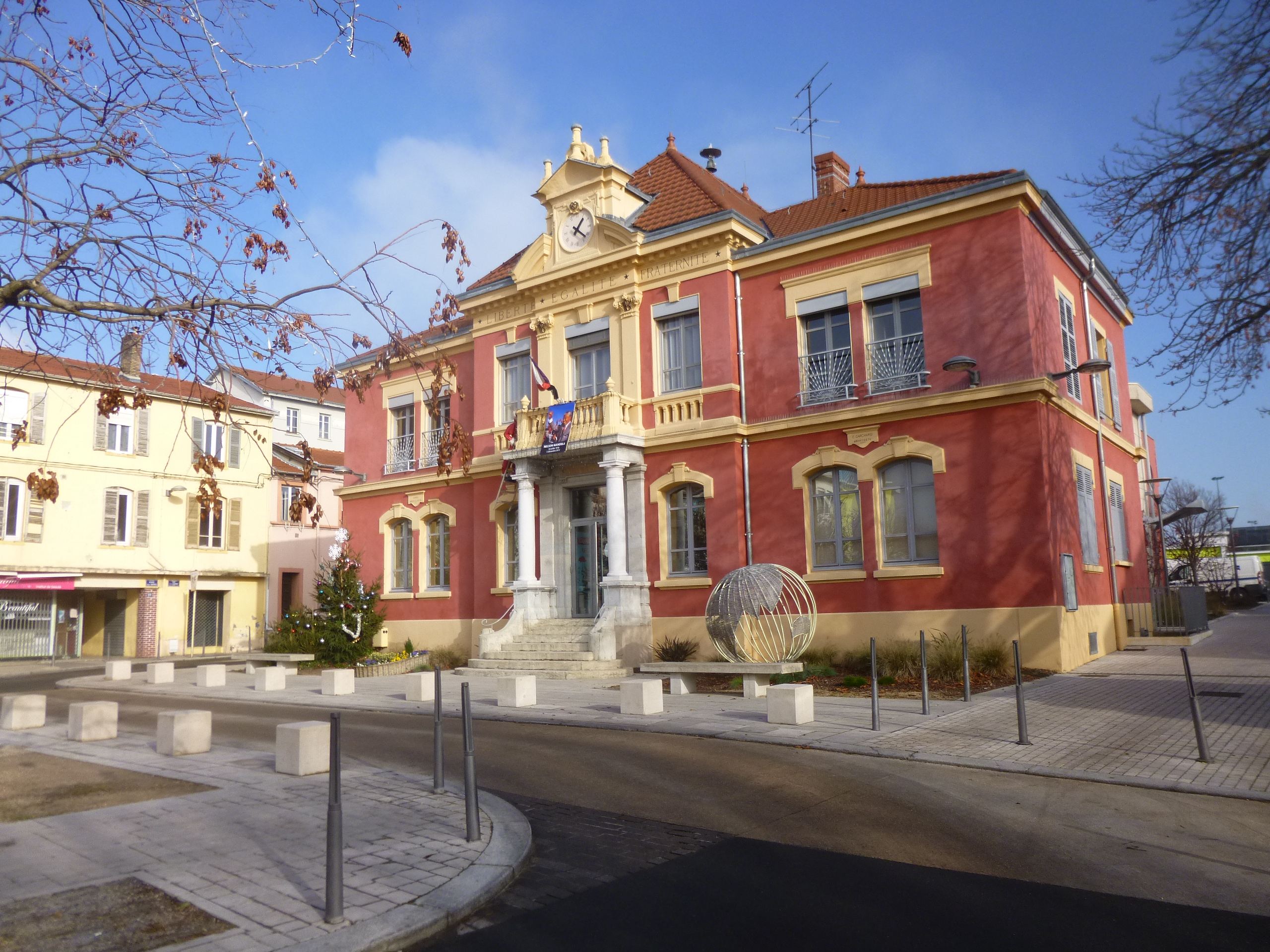
- The town hall in Pierre-Bénite

- Coat of arms
- Location of Pierre-Bénite
- Location within France Location within Auvergne-Rhône-Alpes
- Coordinates: 45°42′16″N 4°49′30″E
- Country: France
- Region: Auvergne-Rhône-Alpes
- Metropolis: Lyon Metropolis
- Arrondissement: Lyon
- Commune: Oullins-Pierre-Bénite
- Area^{1}: 4.48 km^{2} (1.73 sq mi)
- Elevation: 167 m (548 ft)
- Highest elevation: 232 m (761 ft)
- Lowest elevation: 155 m (509 ft)
- Population (2022): 10,585
  - Density: 2,360/km^{2} (6,120/sq mi)
- Demonym: Pierre-Bénitain(e)s
- Time zone: UTC+01:00 (CET)
  - Summer (DST): UTC+02:00 (CEST)
- Postal code: 69310
- Website: www.pierrebenite.fr
- ^{1} French Land Register data, which excludes lakes, ponds, glaciers > 1 km^{2} (0.386 sq mi or 247 acres) and river estuaries.

Pierre-Bénite (French pronunciation: [pjɛʁ benit]; Arpitan: Piérra-Benête) is a former commune in the Metropolis of Lyon in Auvergne-Rhône-Alpes region in eastern France.

On 1 January 2024, Pierre-Bénite merged with Oullins to form the new the commune of Oullins-Pierre-Bénite.

== Geography ==
Pierre-Bénite, a suburb around 6 kilometers (3.7 miles) south of Lyon, extends over 440 hectares (1,100 acres) on the right bank of the river Rhône, alongside the A7 motorway. It is limited to the north by Lyon, to the west by Oullins, to the southwest by Saint-Genis-Laval, to the south by Irigny, and to the east by the Rhône, across from Saint-Fons.

== Population ==
Historical population
Year	Pop.	±% p.a.
1968	8,030	—
1975	10,049	+3.26%
1982	9,468	−0.85%
1990	9,574	+0.14%
1999	9,963	+0.44%
2007	9,953	−0.01%
2012	10,071	+0.24%
2017	10,390	+0.63%
Source: INSEE

== See also ==
- Communes of the Metropolis of Lyon
