= Giovanni Battista Balbis =

Italian botanist and politician (1765–1831)

- Born: 17 November 1765
- Died: 3 February 1831 (aged 65)
- Other name: Jean-Baptiste Balbis
- Occupations: Botanist, politician
- Known for: Co-founded the Linnean Society of Lyon

Giovanni Battista Balbis (17 November 1765 – 3 February 1831) was an Italian botanist and politician who worked in Italy and France. He was also known by the names Gioanni Battista Balbis and Jean-Baptiste Balbis.

With French botanist Clémence Lortet and others, he co-founded the Linnean Society of Lyon.

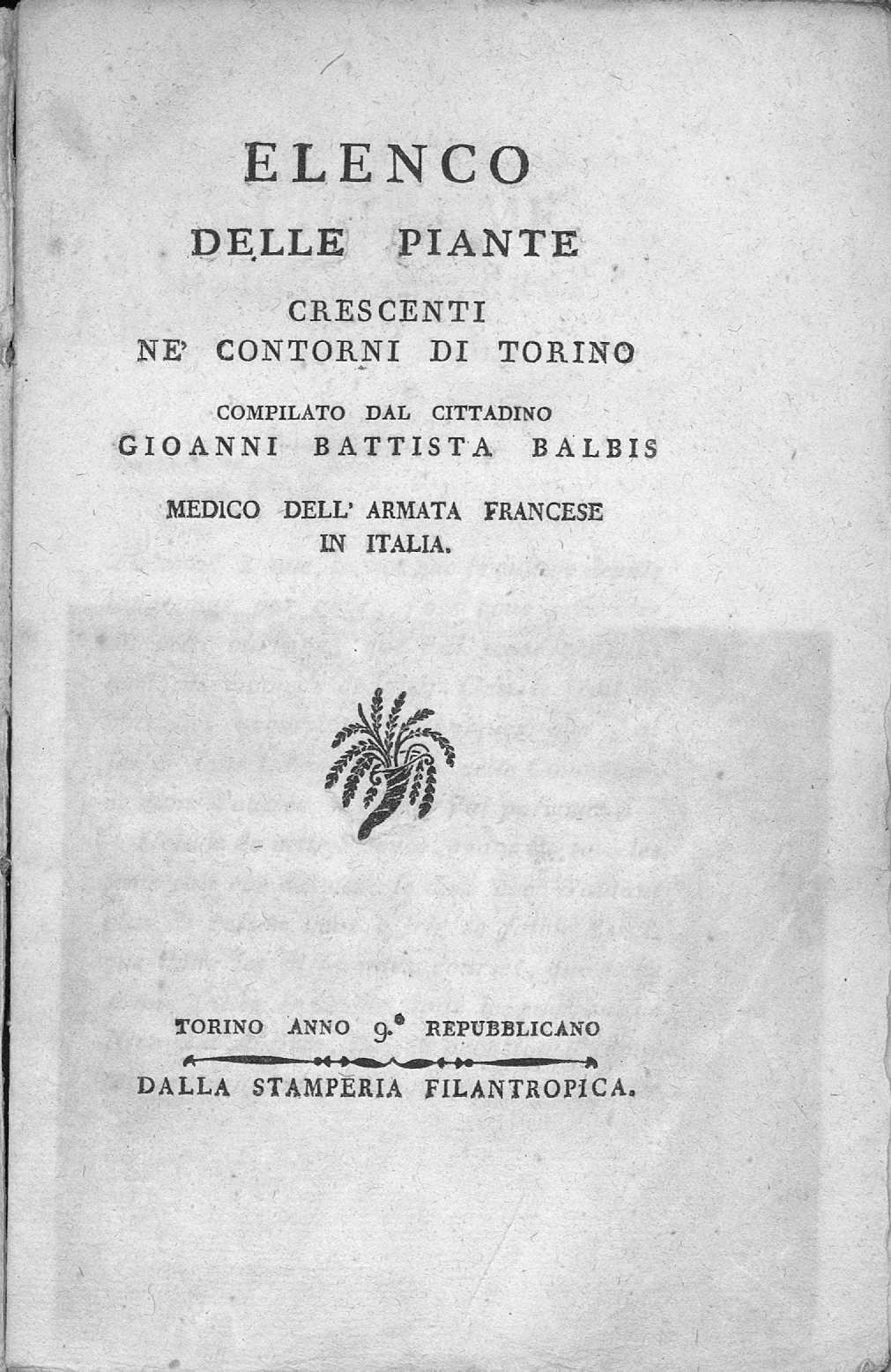
Elenco delle piante crescenti ne' contorni di Torino, 1800-1801

In 1804, botanist Antonio José Cavanilles, published Balbisia, which is a genus of flowering plants from southern South America, belonging to the family Francoaceae and was named in Giovanni Battista Balbis's honour.
