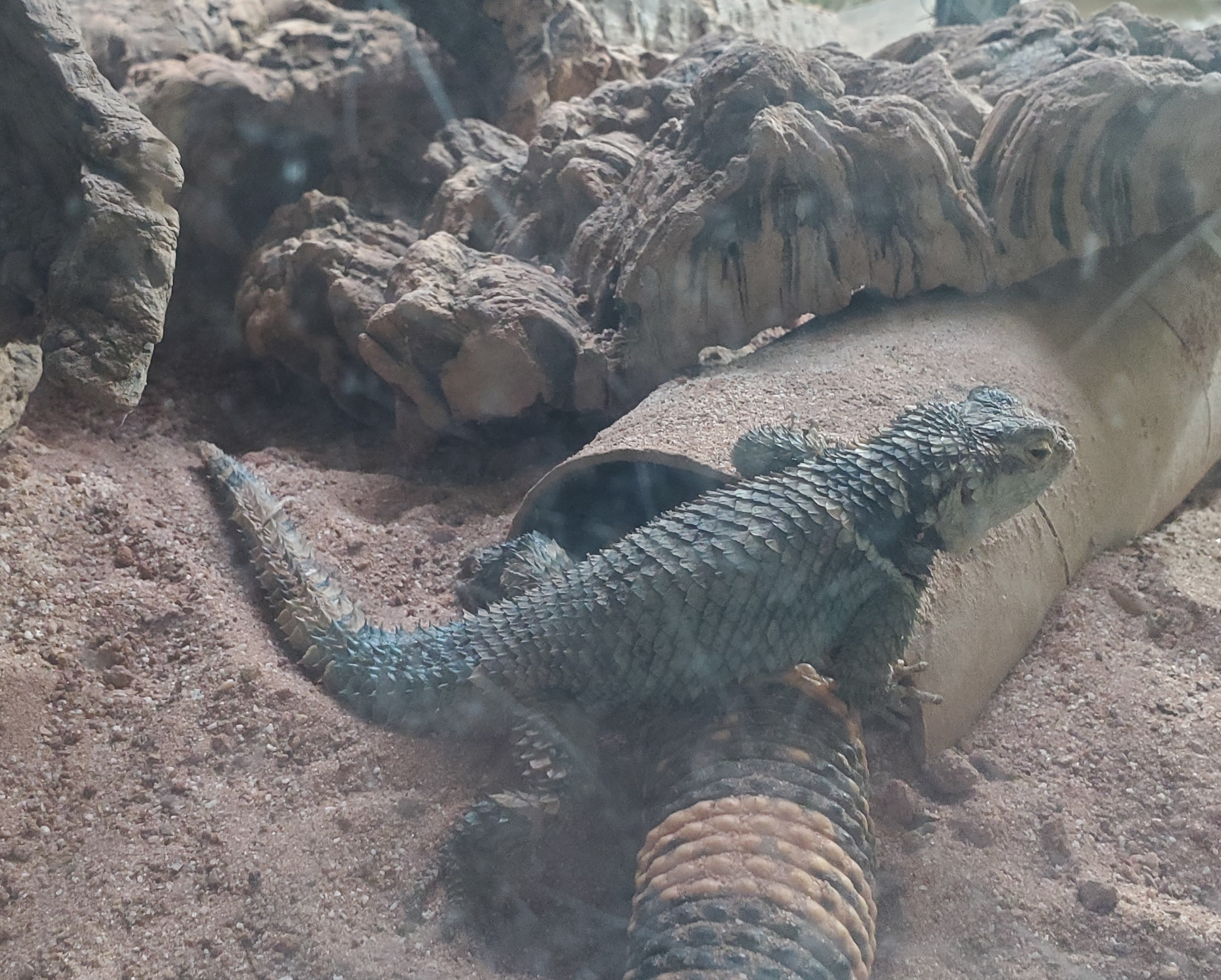

Conservation status
- Least Concern (IUCN 3.1)

Scientific classification
- Kingdom: Animalia
- Phylum: Chordata
- Class: Reptilia
- Order: Squamata
- Suborder: Iguania
- Family: Phrynosomatidae
- Genus: Sceloporus
- Species: S. serrifer

Binomial name
- Sceloporus serrifer Cope, 1866

= Sceloporus serrifer =

Species of lizard

Sceloporus serrifer, the rough-scaled lizard or Yucatecan rough-scaled lizard, is a species of phrynosomatid lizard.

== Geographic range ==
It ranges from the United States in southern Texas, through the eastern states of Mexico, to Central America in Guatemala and Belize.

== Subspecies ==
Three subspecies of S. serrifer are recognized, including the nominate race, but the subspecies are known to intergrade in areas where their geographic ranges overlap, so differentiating them can be difficult.

- S. s. plioporus H.M. Smith, 1939 - West Gulf spiny lizard
- S. s. prezygus H.M. Smith, 1942
- S. s. serrifer Cope, 1866 - Yucatán spiny lizard
