= Louis Charles Émile Lortet =

French physician, botanist, zoologist and Egyptologist

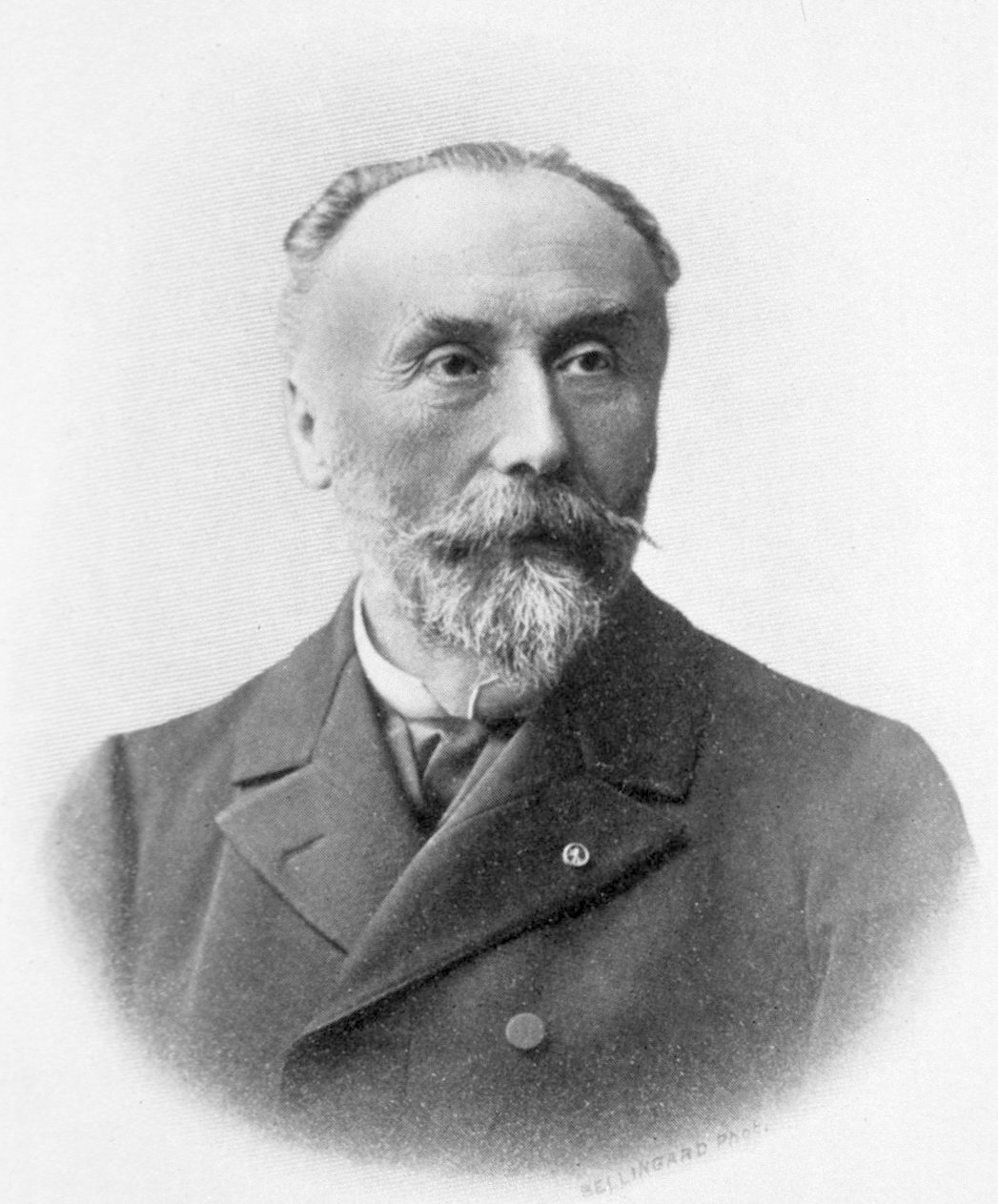
Louis Charles Émile Lortet

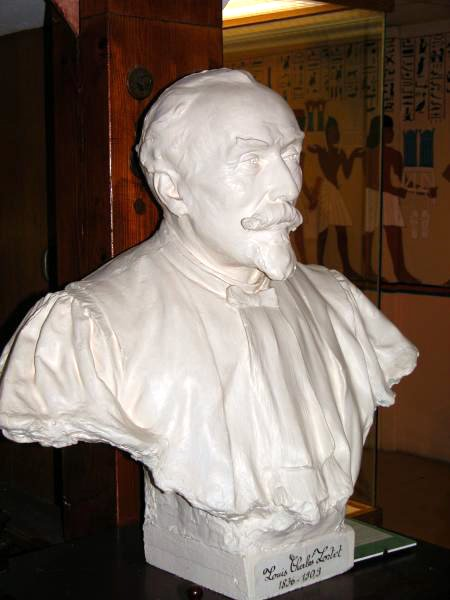
Bust of Louis Charles Émile Lortet

Louis Charles Émile Lortet (22 August 1836 – 26 December 1909) was a French physician, botanist, zoologist and Egyptologist who was a native of Oullins.

He earned his medical doctorate in 1861, and his degree in natural sciences in 1867. He served as premier doyen at the Faculty of Medicine of Lyon from 1877 until 1906. Also, from 1868 to 1909, he was director of the natural history museum in Lyon.

Lortet is remembered for his scientific and zoological expeditions to the Middle East (Syria, Lebanon and Egypt). He performed studies of mummified animals from the New Kingdom of ancient Egypt, and in 1880 took part in an excavation of a Phoenician necropolis.

Lortet was a member of numerous scientific societies, such as the Société de géographie de Lyon, being a founding member in 1858. Species with the epithet of lorteti are named in his honor; an example being the pufferfish species Carinotetraodon lorteti.

== Family ==
His Grandmother Clémence Lortet (17 September 1772 – 15 April 1835) was a French botanist and naturalist.

== Written works ==
- Faune momifiée de l'ancienne Égypte (Mummified fauna of Ancient Egypt)
- La vérité (Nécropole de Khozan) (The truth; Necropolis of Khozan)
- Recherches sur la vitesse du cours du sang dans les artères du cheval au moyen d’un nouvel hémadromographe (Research on the velocity of blood in the arteries of a horse by means of a new hemadromograph) (1867)
- La Syrie d'aujourd'hui. Voyages dans La Phénicie, Le Liban et La Judée (Syria of today. Voyages in Phoenecia, Lebanon and Judaea. 1875–1880 (1881)
- Note sur le Rhizoprion bariensis de Jourdan, (Article on Rhizoprion bariensis of Jourdan)
- Passage des leucocytes a travers les membranes organiques (Passage of leucocytes through the organic membranes) (1867)
- Recherche sur les mastodontes et les faunas mammalogiques qui les accompagnent (Research of mastodons and associated megafauna) (1878)
- Poissons et reptiles du Lac de Tibériade et de quelques autres parties de la Syrie (1883)
- Les reptiles fossiles du bassin du Rhône (Reptilian fossils of the Rhone basin) (1892)

== Tribute ==
For the fish known as both Luciobarbus lorteti and Barbus lorteti although the patronym is not identified, probably in honor of Lortet.

== See also ==
- Category:Taxa named by Louis Charles Émile Lortet
