= List of Geranium species =

The genus Geranium contains more than 420 plant species, which are also known as cranesbill or hardy geranium (to distinguish them from Pelargonium species).

== A ==
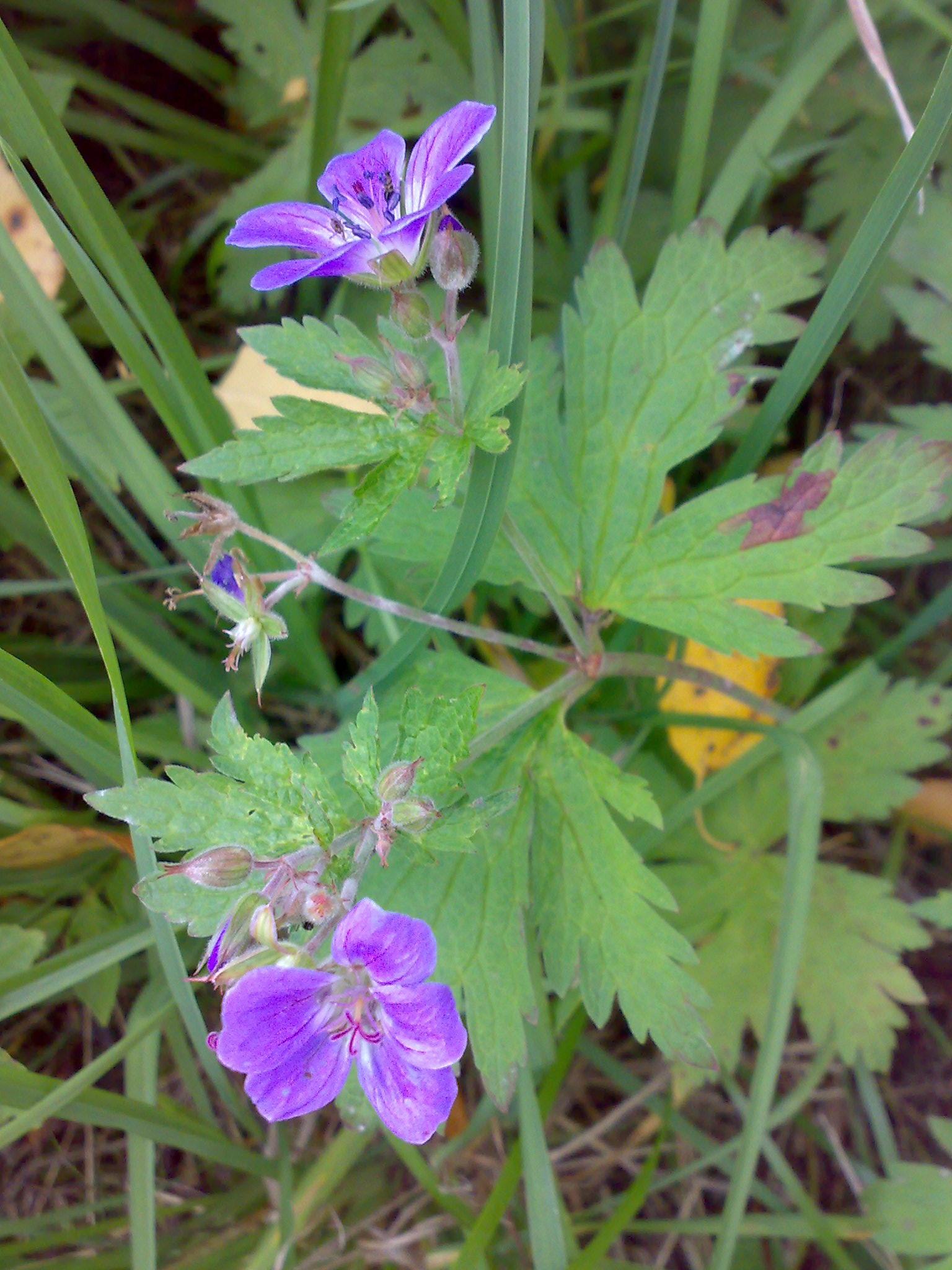
Geranium sylvaticum

- Geranium aculeolatum
- Geranium aequale
- Geranium aequatoriale
- Geranium affine
- Geranium albanum
- Geranium albicans
- Geranium albidum
- Geranium albiflorum
- Geranium album
- Geranium alonsoi
- Geranium alpicola
- Geranium amatolicum
- Geranium amoenum
- Geranium andicola
- Geranium andringitense
- Geranium angelense
- Geranium angustipetalum
- Geranium antisanae
- Geranium antrorsum
- Geranium apricum
- Geranium arabicum
- Geranium arachnoideum
- Geranium arboreum – Hawai'i red cranesbill, Hawaiian red-flowered geranium
- Geranium ardjunense
- Geranium argenteum – silvery cranesbill
- Geranium argentinum
- Geranium aristatum
- Geranium asiaticum
- Geranium asphodeloides – Turkish rock geranium
- Geranium atlanticum
- Geranium atropurpureum – western purple cranesbill
- Geranium austroapenninum
- Geranium ayacuchense
- Geranium ayavacense
- Geranium azorelloides

== B ==
- Geranium balgooyi
- Geranium bangii
- Geranium baschkyzylsaicum
- Geranium baurianum
- Geranium bellum
- Geranium bequaertii
- Geranium berterianum
- Geranium bicknellii – Bicknell's cranesbill, northern cranesbill
- Geranium biuncinatum
- Geranium bockii
- Geranium bohemicum
- Geranium bolivianum
- Geranium braziliense
- Geranium brutium
- Geranium brycei
- Geranium butuoense

== C ==
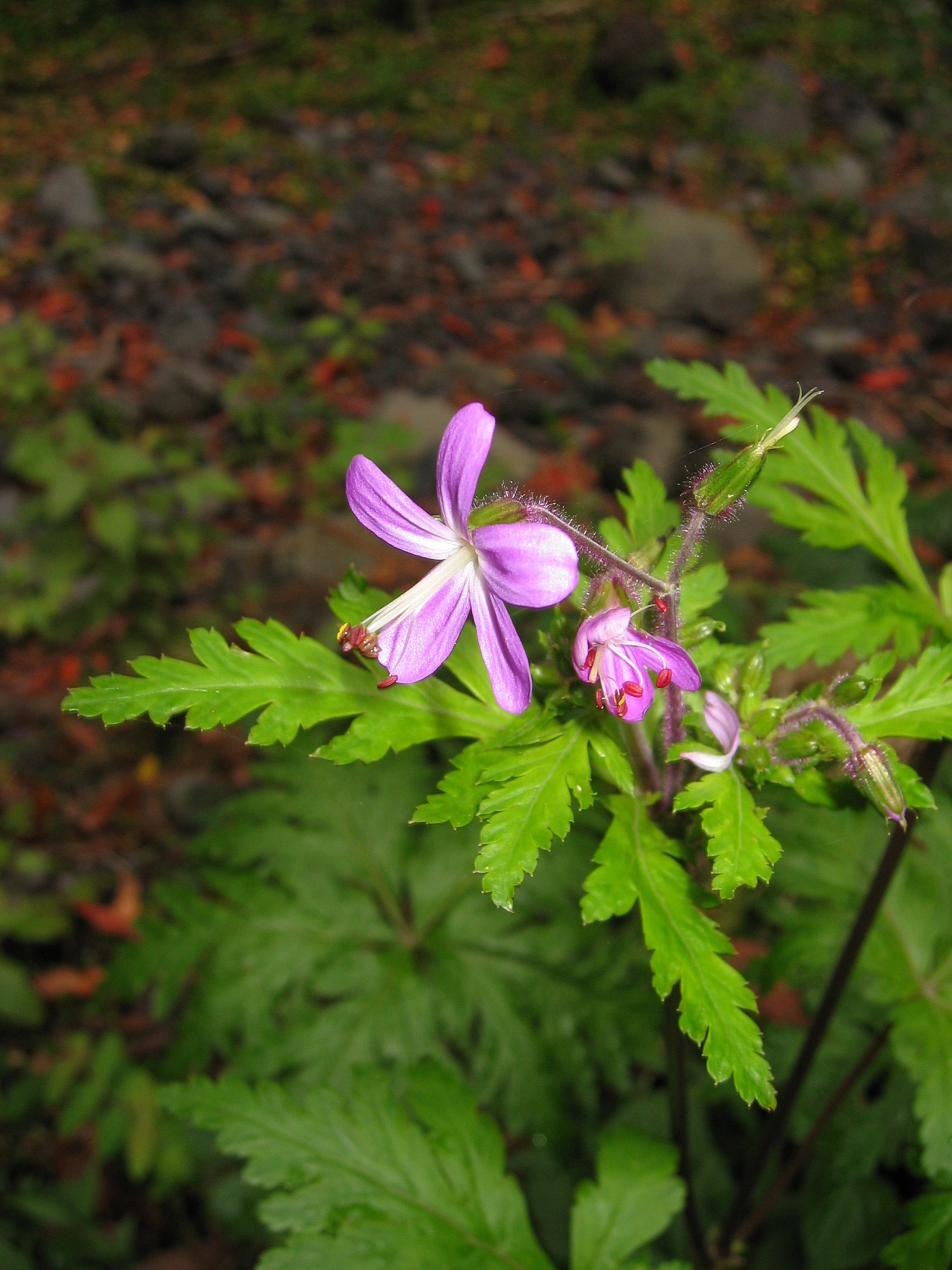
Geranium reuteri

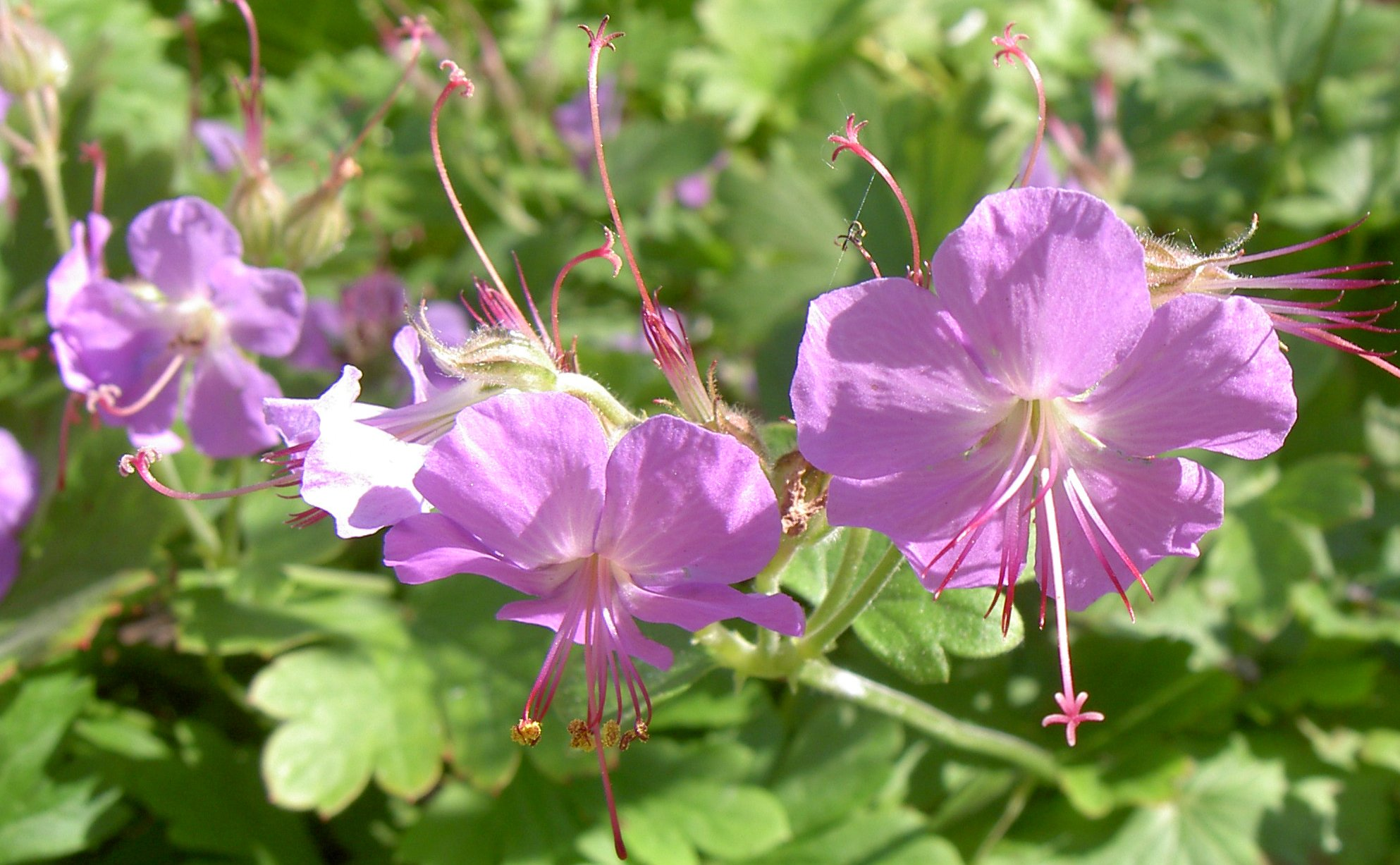
Geranium × cantabrigiense

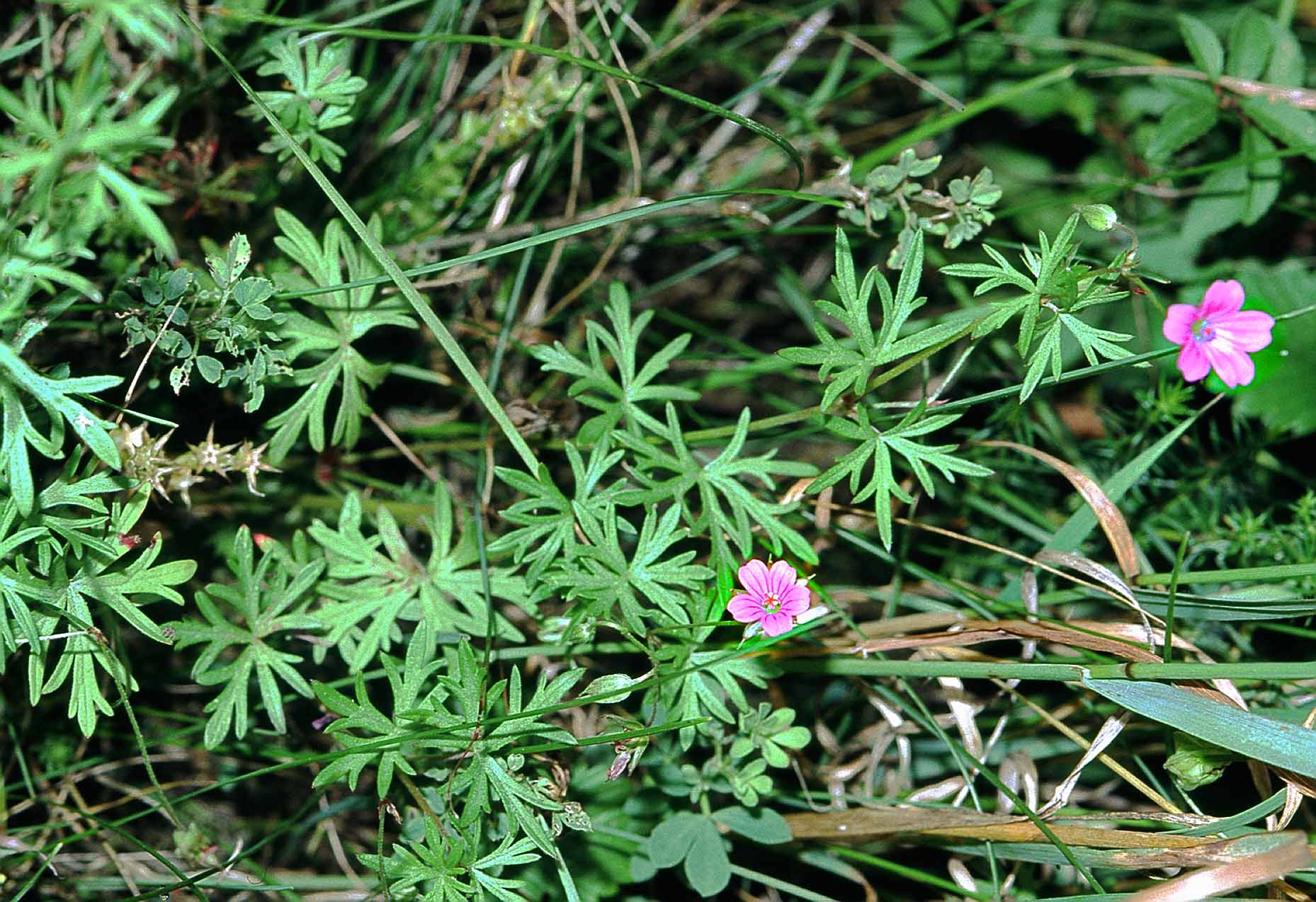
Geranium columbinum, long-stalked cranesbill

- Geranium caeruleatum
- Geranium caespitosum – Pineywoods geranium, purple cluster geranium, tufted geranium
- Geranium caffrum
- Geranium californicum – California cranesbill
- Geranium campanulatum
- Geranium campii
- Geranium canescens
- Geranium canopurpureum
- Geranium × cantabrigiense (G. dalmaticum × G. maccrorrhizum)
- Geranium carmineum
- Geranium carolinianum – Carolina cranesbill, Carolina geranium
- Geranium cataractum
- Geranium caucense
- Geranium cazorlense
- Geranium chamaense
- Geranium chaparense
- Geranium charucanum
- Geranium chelikii
- Geranium chilense
- Geranium chimborazense
- Geranium chinchense
- Geranium chinense
- Geranium christensenianum
- Geranium cinereum – ashy cranesbill
- Geranium clarkei – Clark's geranium
- Geranium clarum
- Geranium collae
- Geranium collinum
- Geranium columbianum
- Geranium columbinum – long-stalked cranesbill
- Geranium comarapense
- Geranium commutatum
- Geranium confertum
- Geranium contortum
- Geranium core-core
- Geranium costaricense
- Geranium crassipes
- Geranium crassiusculum
- Geranium crenatifolium
- Geranium cruceroense
- Geranium cuatrecasasii
- Geranium cuchillense
- Geranium cuneatum – silver geranium, hinahina

== D ==
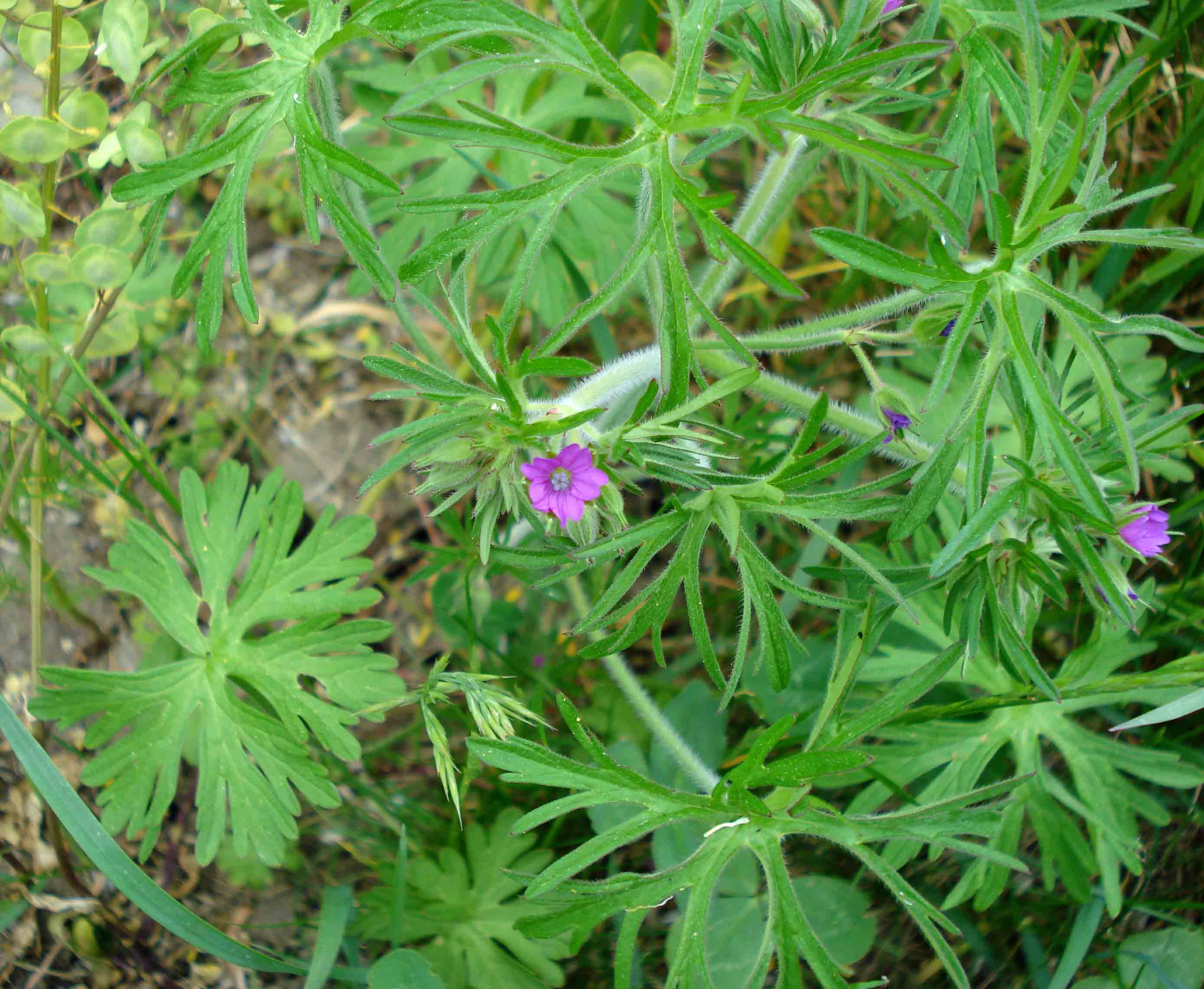
Geranium dissectum, cut-leaved cranesbill

- Geranium dahuricum
- Geranium dalmaticum – Dalmatian cranesbill
- Geranium davisianum
- Geranium delavayi
- Geranium deltoideum
- Geranium dielsianum
- Geranium diffusum
- Geranium digitatum
- Geranium discolor
- Geranium dissectum – cut-leaved cranesbill, cutleaf geranium
- Geranium divaricatum – spreading cranesbill, fanleaf geranium
- Geranium dolomiticum
- Geranium donianum
- Geranium drakensbergense
- Geranium dregei
- Geranium drummondii
- Geranium duclouxii
- Geranium durangense

== E ==
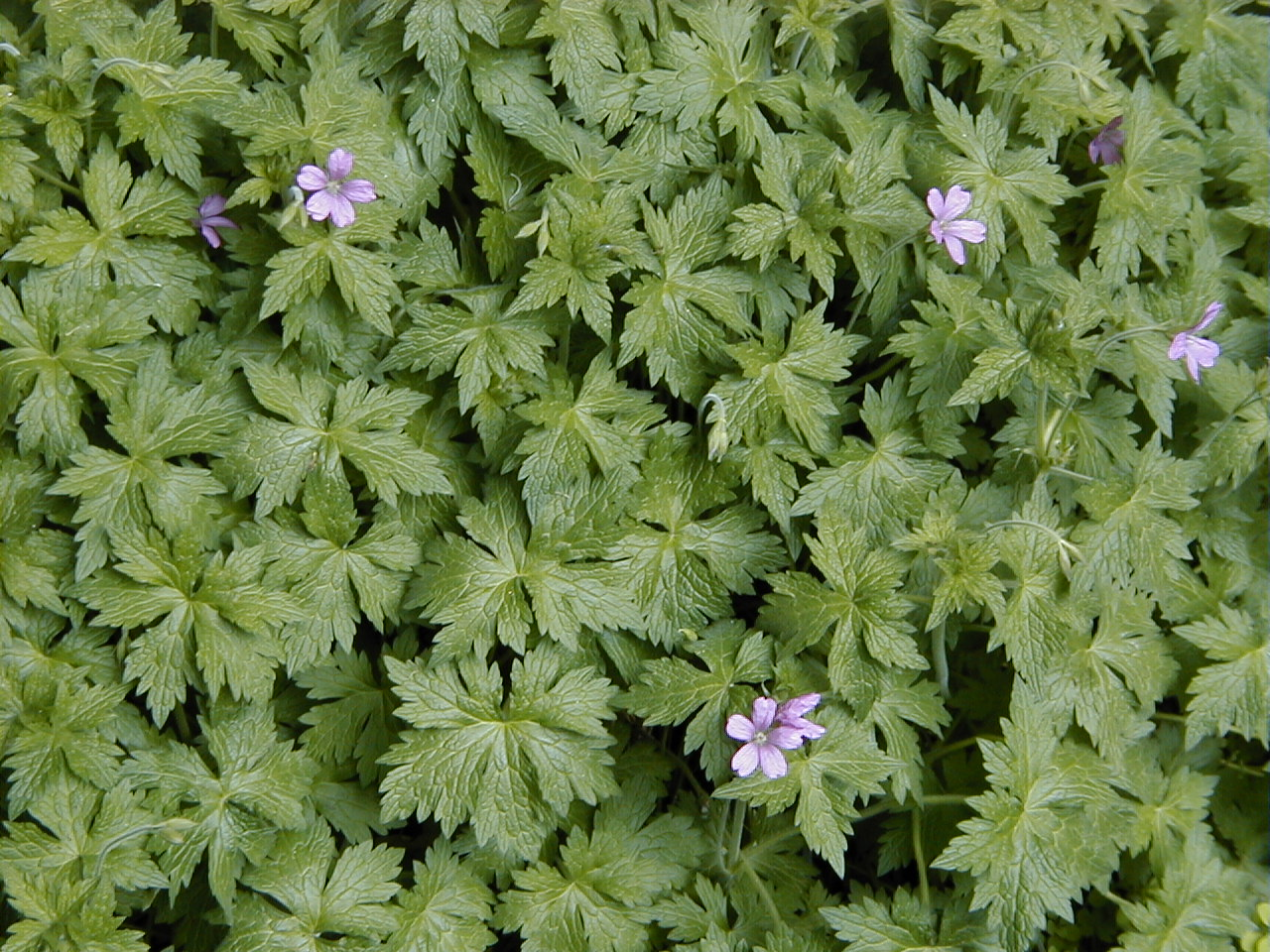
Geranium endressii, French cranesbill

- Geranium ecuadoriense
- Geranium editum
- Geranium eginense
- Geranium elatum
- Geranium endressii – French cranesbill, Endress' cranesbill
- Geranium erianthum – woolly geranium
- Geranium escalonense
- Geranium exellii
- Geranium exallum

== F ==
- Geranium fallax
- Geranium fargesii
- Geranium farreri
- Geranium favosum
- Geranium ferganense
- Geranium fiebrigianum
- Geranium filipes
- Geranium finitimum
- Geranium flaccidum
- Geranium flanaganii
- Geranium franchetii
- Geranium frigidurbis
- Geranium fuscicaule

== G ==
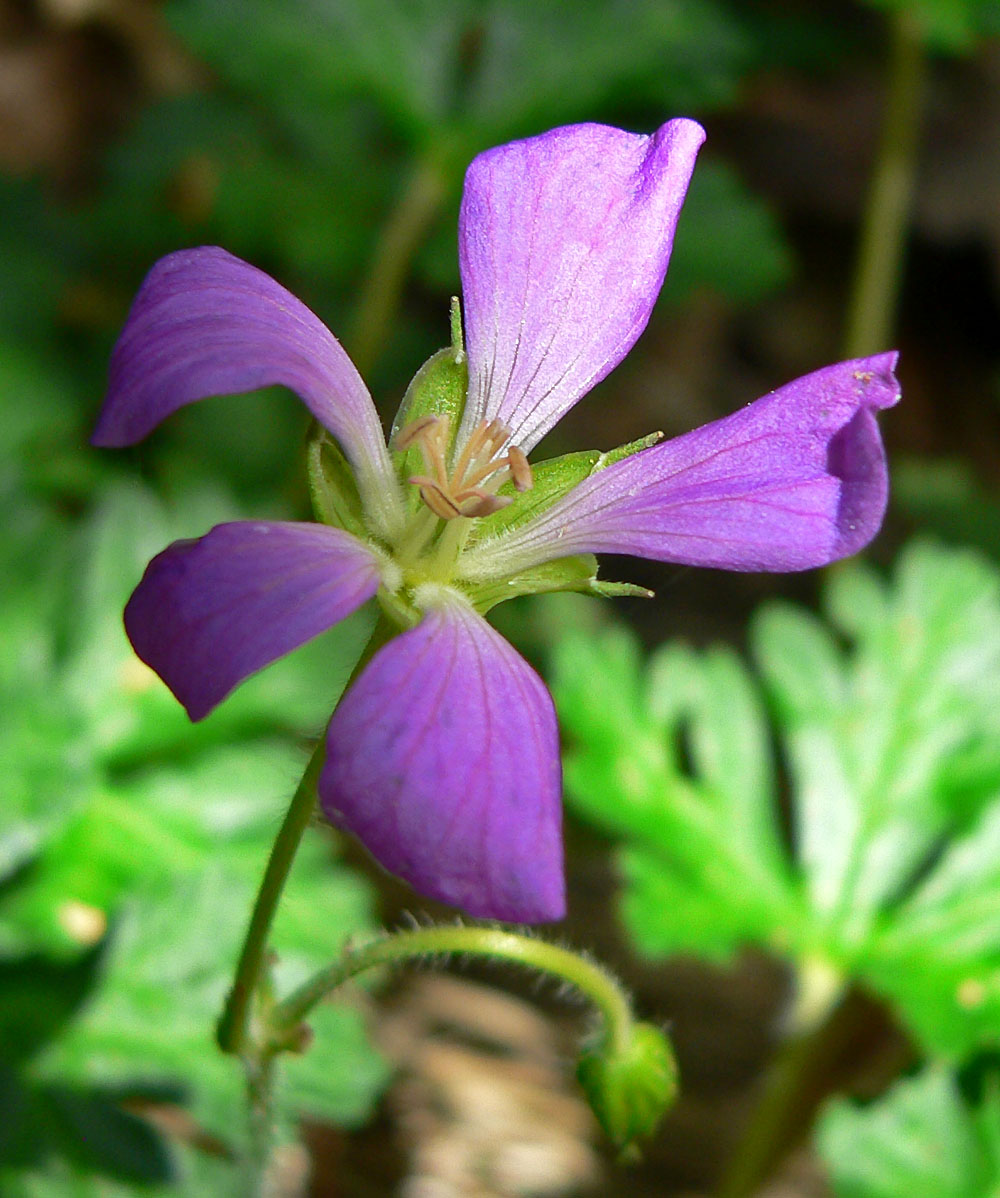
Geranium goldmanii

- Geranium geissei
- Geranium gentryi
- Geranium glaberrimum Boiss. & Heldr.
- Geranium glanduligerum
- Geranium goldmanii
- Geranium gorbizense
- Geranium gracile
- Geranium grandistipulatum
- Geranium graniticola
- Geranium guamanense
- Geranium guatemalense
- Geranium gymnocaulon

== H ==
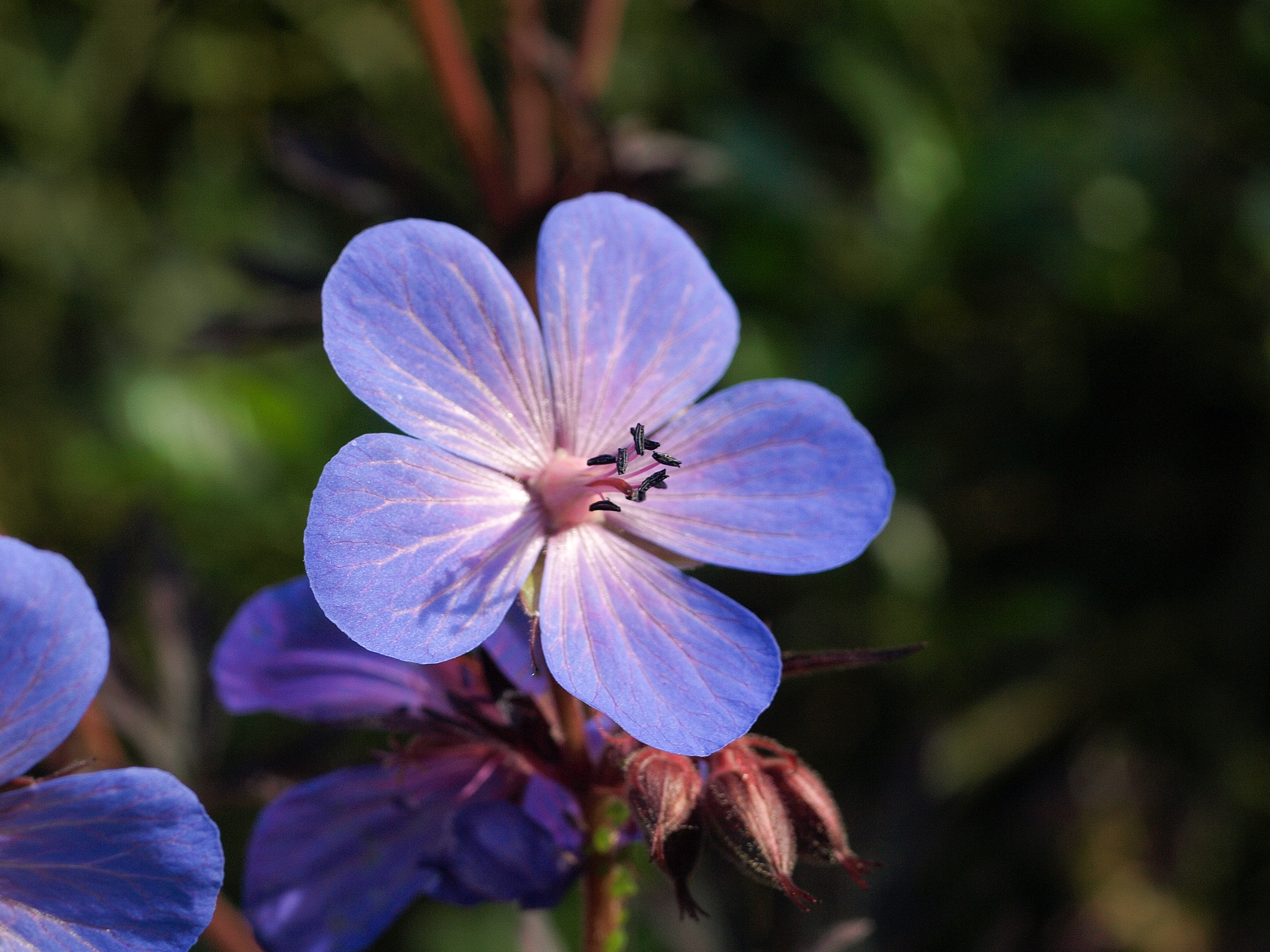
Geranium himalayense, Himalayan cranesbill

- Geranium hanaense – Maui geranium
- Geranium harmsii
- Geranium harveyi
- Geranium hattae
- Geranium hayatanum
- Geranium heinrichsae
- Geranium henryi
- Geranium hernandesii
- Geranium herrerae
- Geranium herzogii
- Geranium hillebrandii
- Geranium himalayense – Himalayan cranesbill, lilac cranesbill
- Geranium hintonii
- Geranium hispidissimum
- Geranium holm-nielsenii
- Geranium holosericeum
- Geranium homeanum – Australasian geranium
- Geranium huantense
- Geranium humboldtii
- Geranium humile
- Geranium hyperacrion
- Geranium hystricinum

== I ==
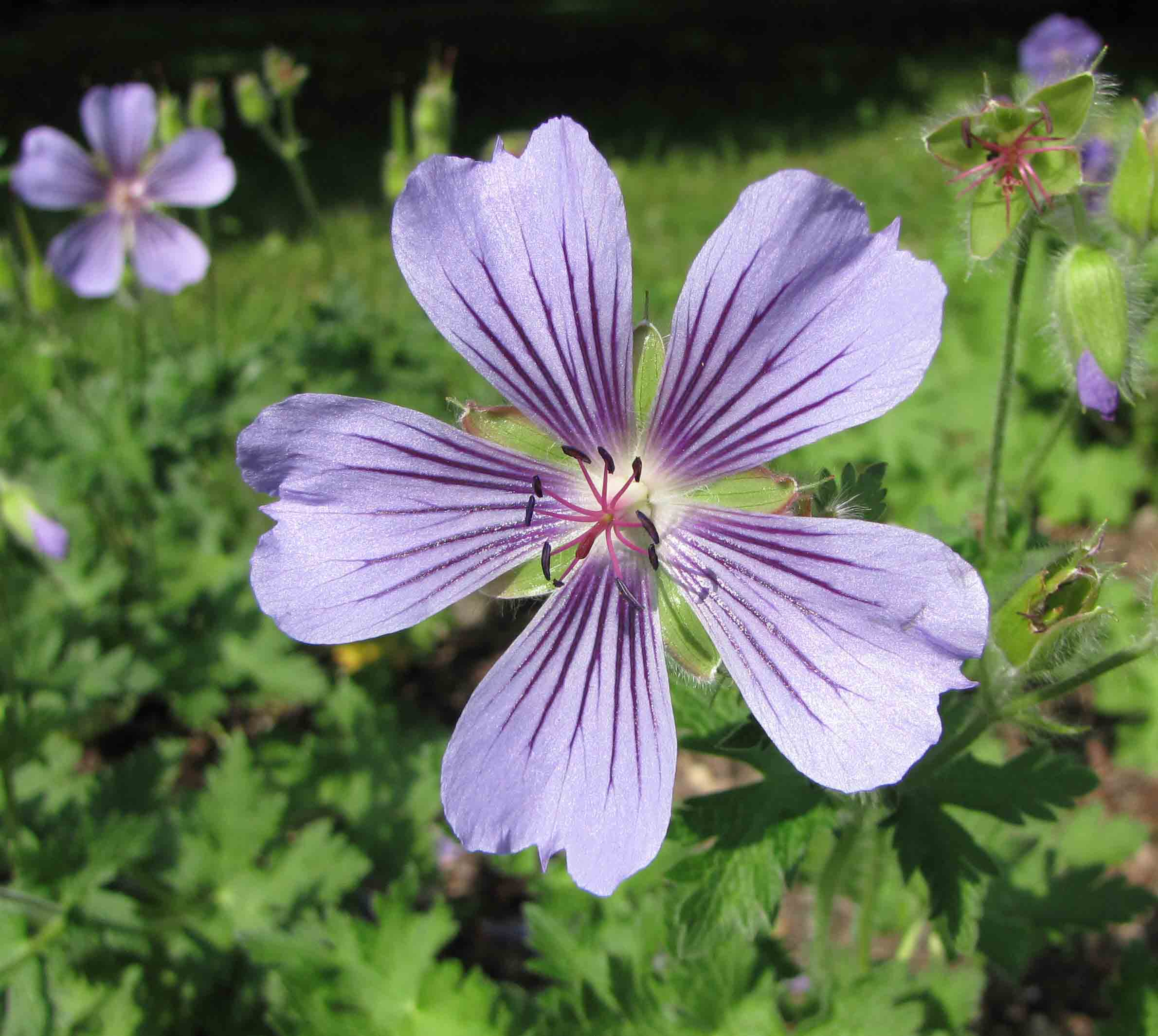
Geranium ibericum

- Geranium ibericum – Caucasian cranesbill, Iberian geranium, Caucasus geranium
- Geranium igualatense
- Geranium imbaburae
- Geranium incanum

== J ==
- Geranium jaekelae
- Geranium jahnii
- Geranium jinchuanense

== K ==
- Geranium kashmirianum
- Geranium kauaiense – Kaua'i geranium
- Geranium kerberi
- Geranium kilimandscharicum
- Geranium killipianum
- Geranium killipii
- Geranium kishtvariense
- Geranium knuthianum
- Geranium knuthii
- Geranium koreanum – Korean cranesbill
- Geranium kotschyi
- Geranium krameri
- Geranium krylovii
- Geranium kurdicum

== L ==
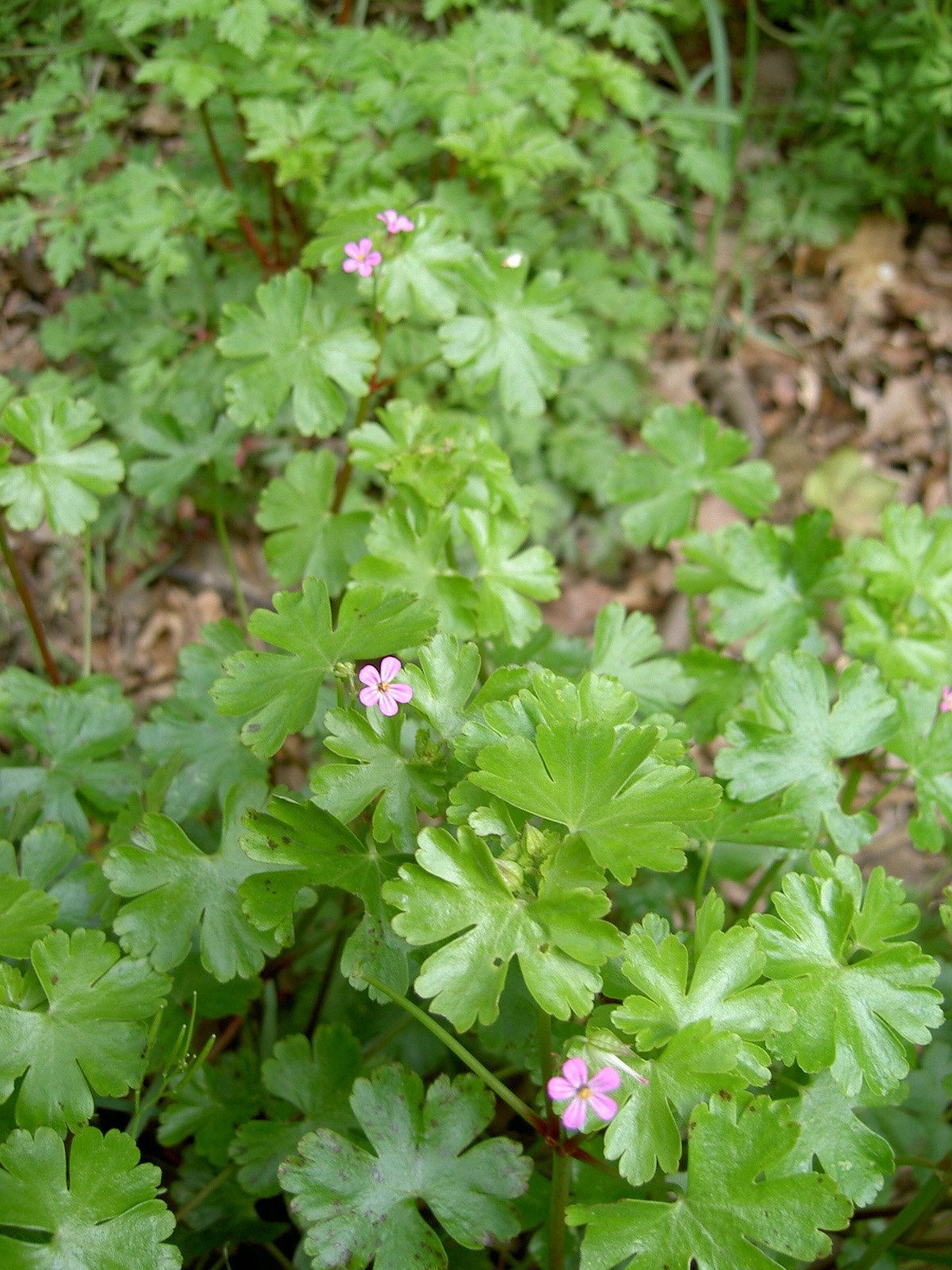
Geranium lucidum, shining cranesbill

- Geranium lacustre
- Geranium lambertii
- Geranium lanuginosum
- Geranium lasiocaulon
- Geranium lasiopus
- Geranium latilobum
- Geranium latum
- Geranium laxicaule
- Geranium lazicum
- Geranium lechleri
- Geranium lentum – Mogollon geranium, Mogollon cranesbill
- Geranium leptodactylon
- Geranium leucanthum
- Geranium libani
- Geranium libanoticum
- Geranium lignosum
- Geranium lilacinum
- Geranium limae
- Geranium × lindavicum (G. argenteum × G. cinereum)
- Geranium linearilobum
- Geranium loxense
- Geranium lozanoi
- Geranium lucidum – shining cranesbill, shining geranium

== M ==
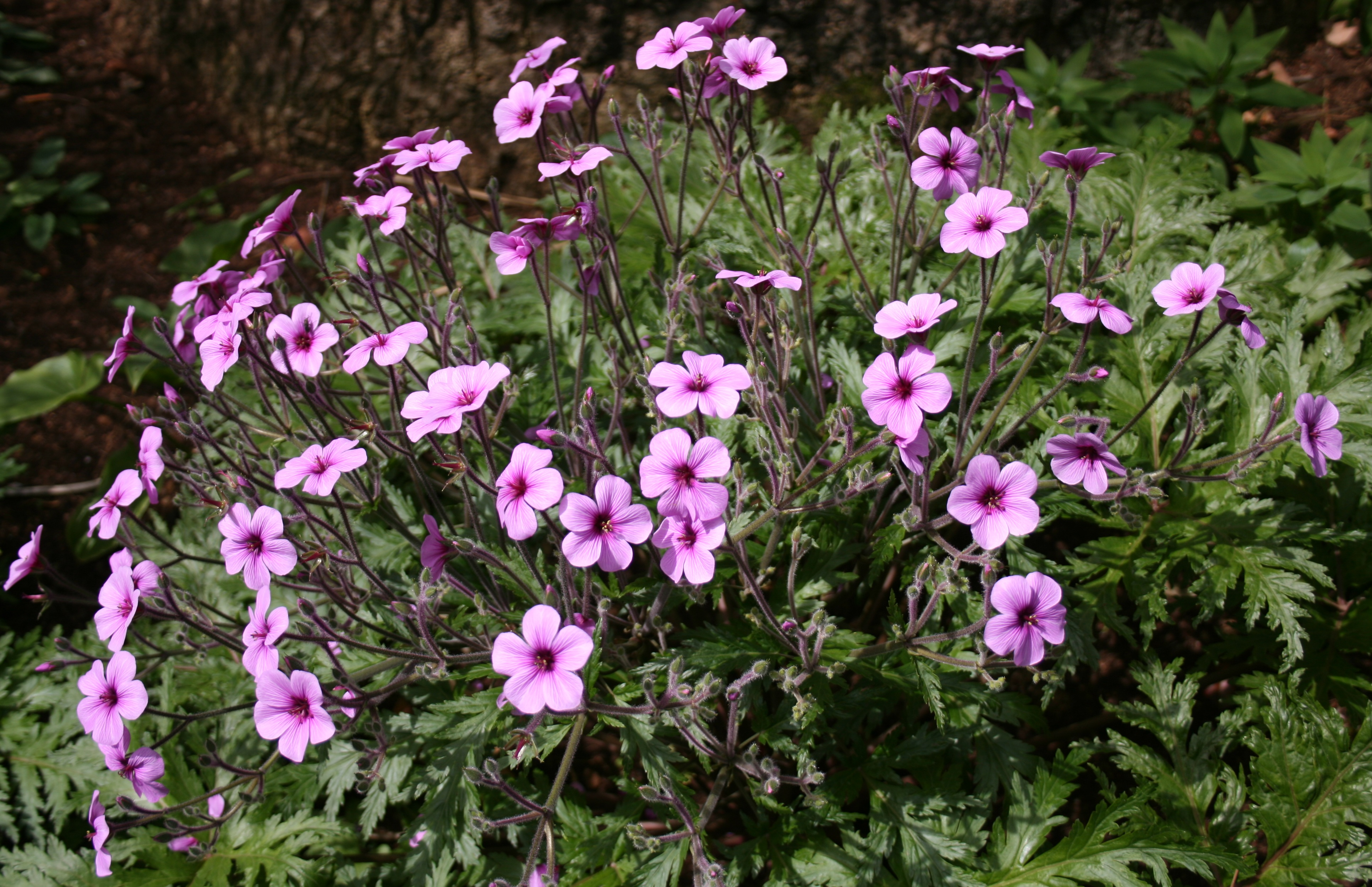
Geranium maderense, Madeira cranesbill

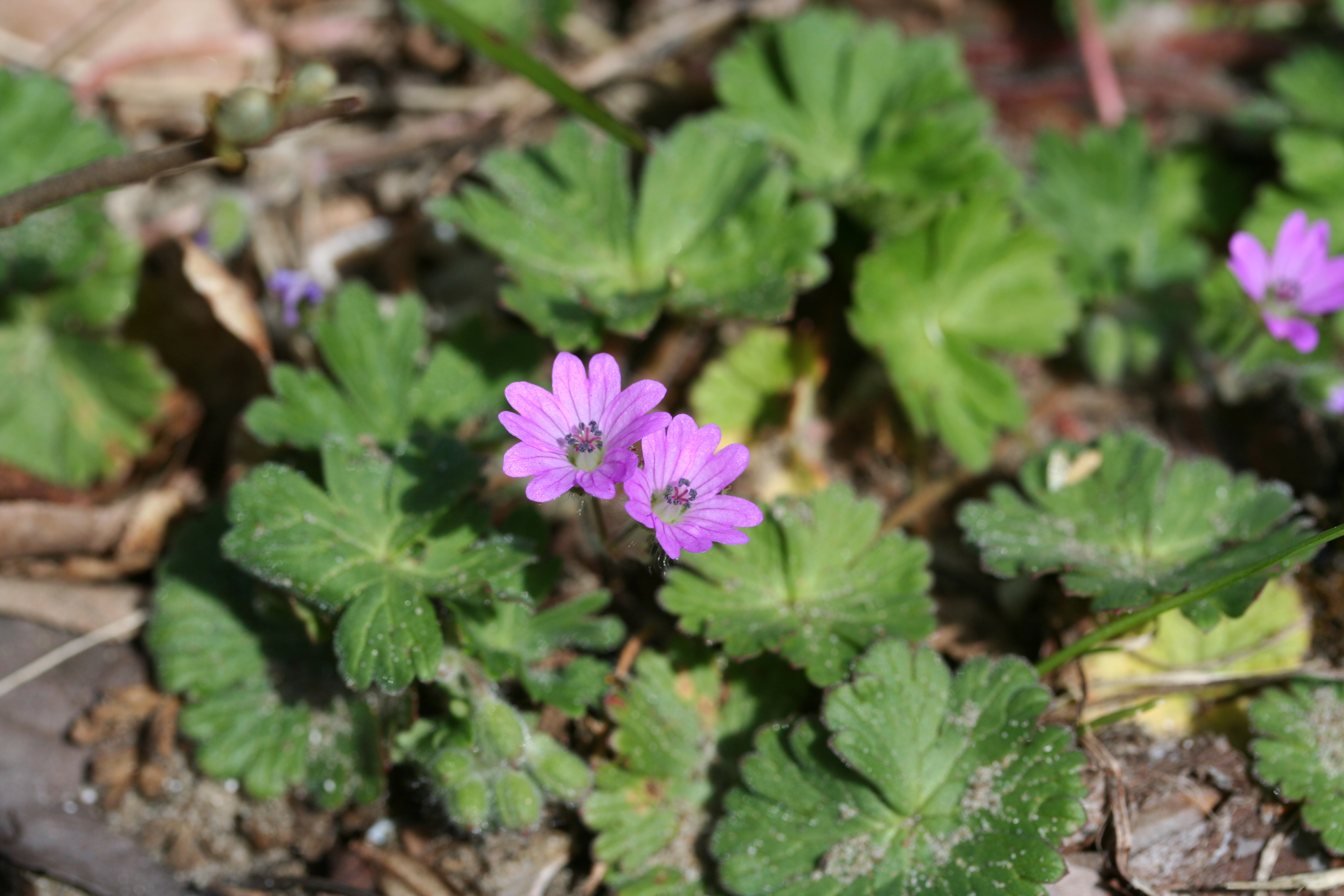
Geranium molle, dovefoot cranesbill

- Geranium macrorrhizum – rock cranesbill, bigroot geranium, Bulgarian geranium, zdravetz
- Geranium macrostylum
- Geranium maculatum – spotted geranium, wild geranium, wood geranium, spotted cranesbill, wild cranesbill, alum bloom, alum root, old maid's nightcap
- Geranium maderense – Madeira cranesbill, giant herb-robert
- Geranium × magnificum – purple cranesbill (G. ibericum × G. platypetalum)
- Geranium magellanicum
- Geranium makmelicum
- Geranium malpapense
- Geranium malviflorum
- Geranium maniculatum
- Geranium mascatense
- Geranium mathewsii
- Geranium matucanense
- Geranium maximowiczii
- Geranium melanopotanicum
- Geranium meridense
- Geranium mexicanum
- Geranium mlanjensis
- Geranium mogotocorense
- Geranium molle – dovefoot cranesbill, awnless geranium, dovefoot geranium
- Geranium mollendiense
- Geranium × monanense – Munich cranesbill (G. phaeum × G. reflexum)
- Geranium monanthum
- Geranium montanum
- Geranium monticola
- Geranium moorei
- Geranium moupinense
- Geranium multiceps
- Geranium multiflorum – Haleakalā geranium, manyflower geranium
- Geranium multipartitum
- Geranium multisectum

== N ==
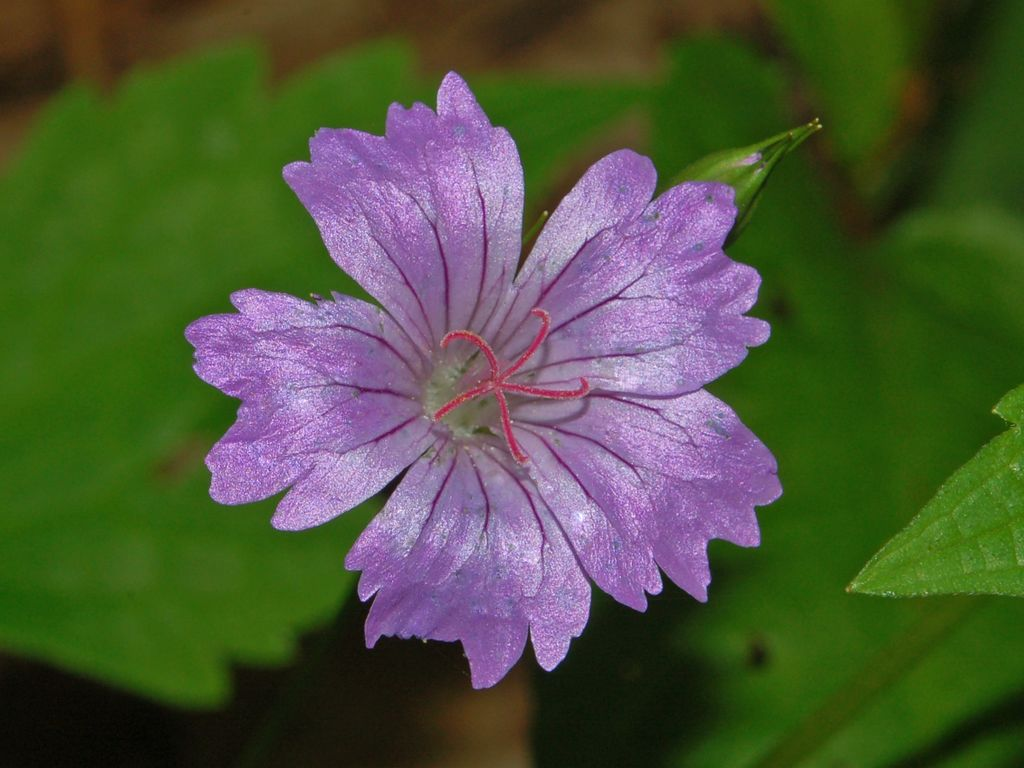
Geranium nodosum

- Geranium nakaoanum
- Geranium nanum
- Geranium napuligerum
- Geranium natalense
- Geranium neglectum
- Geranium neohispidum
- Geranium neopumilum
- Geranium nepalense
- Geranium nervosum
- Geranium niuginiense
- Geranium nivale
- Geranium niveum
- Geranium nodosum – knotted cranesbill
- Geranium nuristanicum
- Geranium nyassense

== O ==
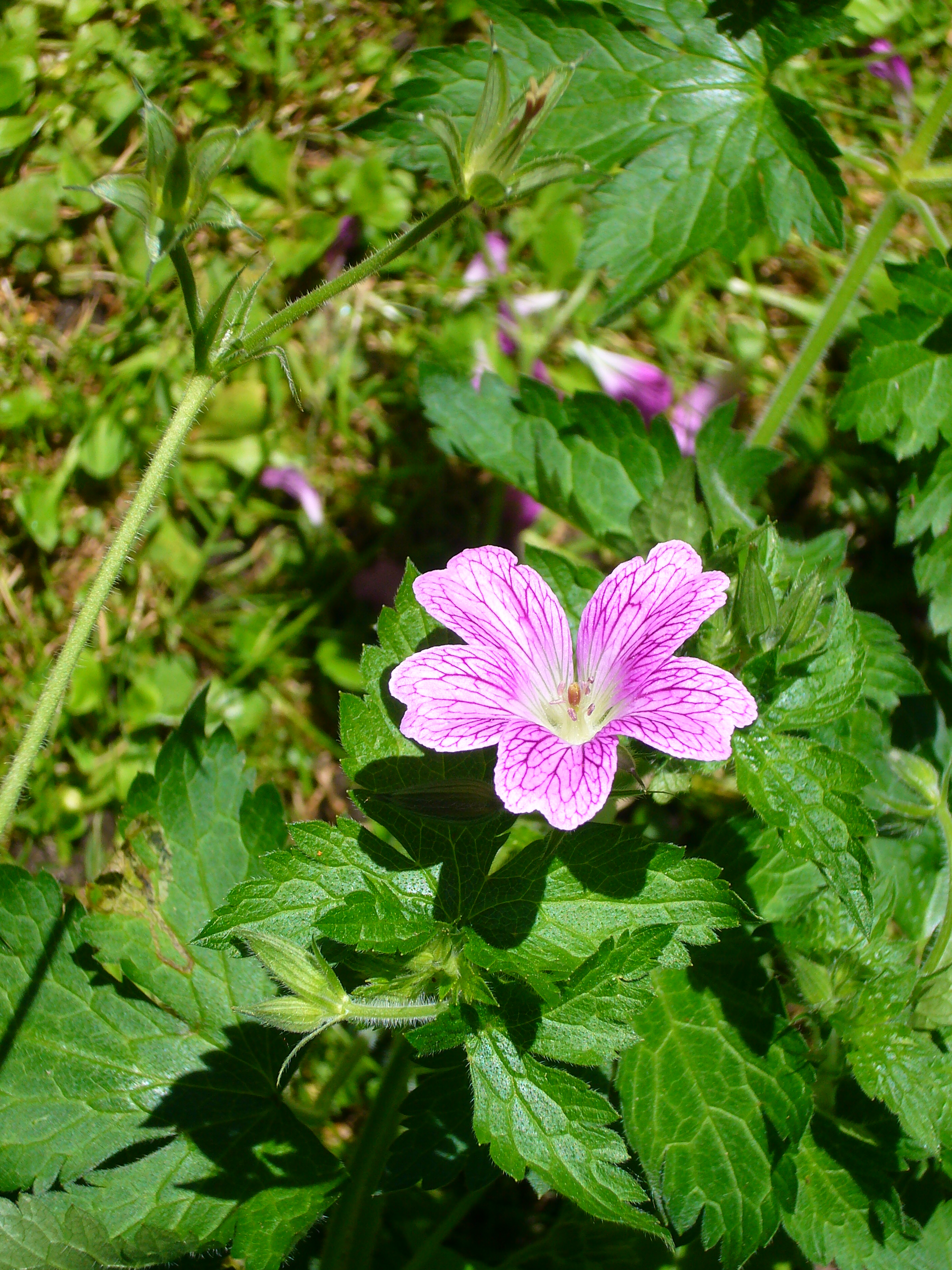
Geranium × oxonianum, Druce's cranesbill

- Geranium oaxacanum
- Geranium obtusisepalum
- Geranium ochsenii
- Geranium oreganum – Oregon geranium, Oregon cranesbill
- Geranium orientali-tibeticum
- Geranium ornithopodioides
- Geranium ornithopodon
- Geranium × oxonianum Yeo – Druce's cranesbill (G. endressi × G. versicolor)

== P ==
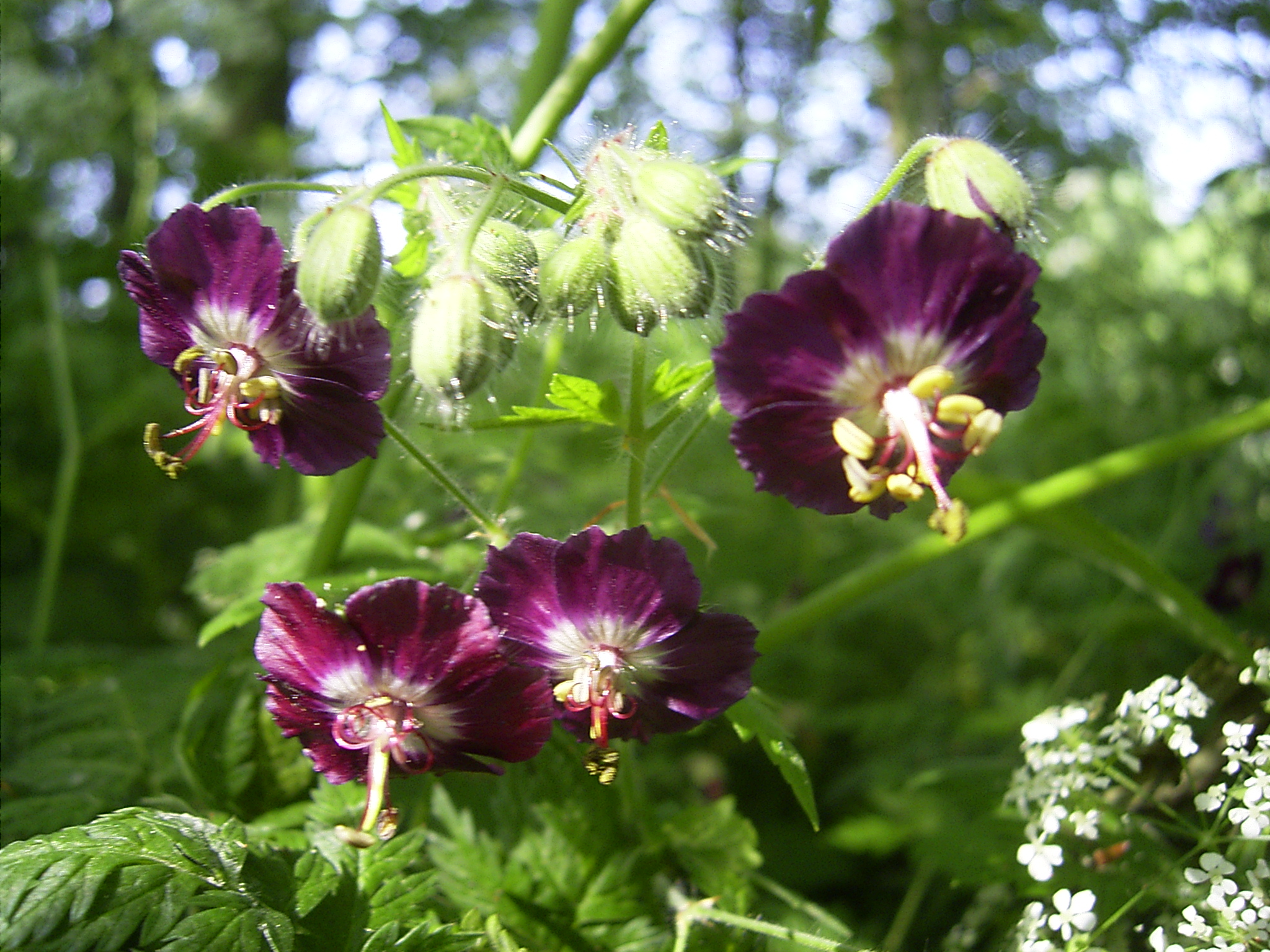
Geranium phaeum, dusky cranesbill

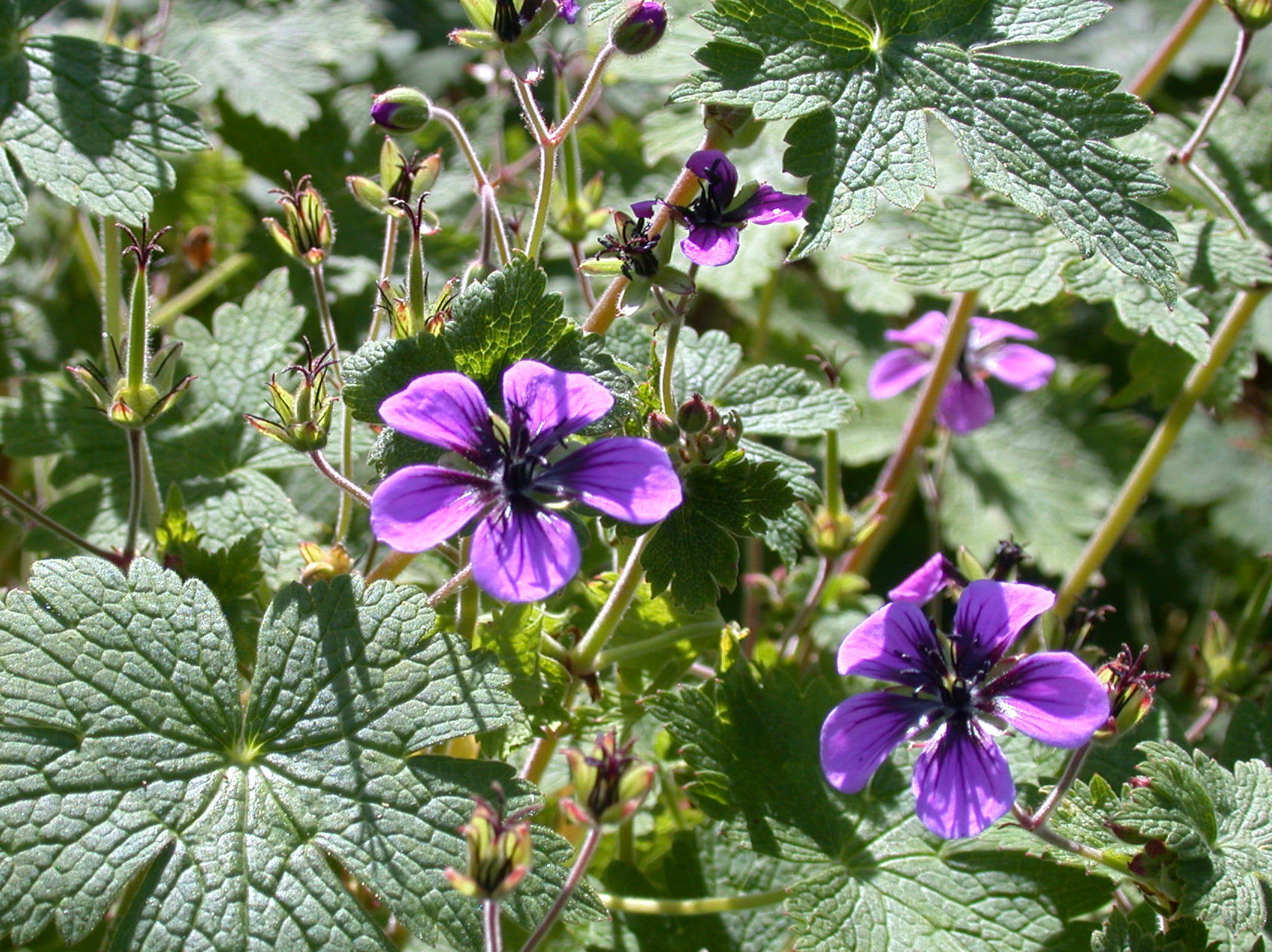
Geranium procurrens

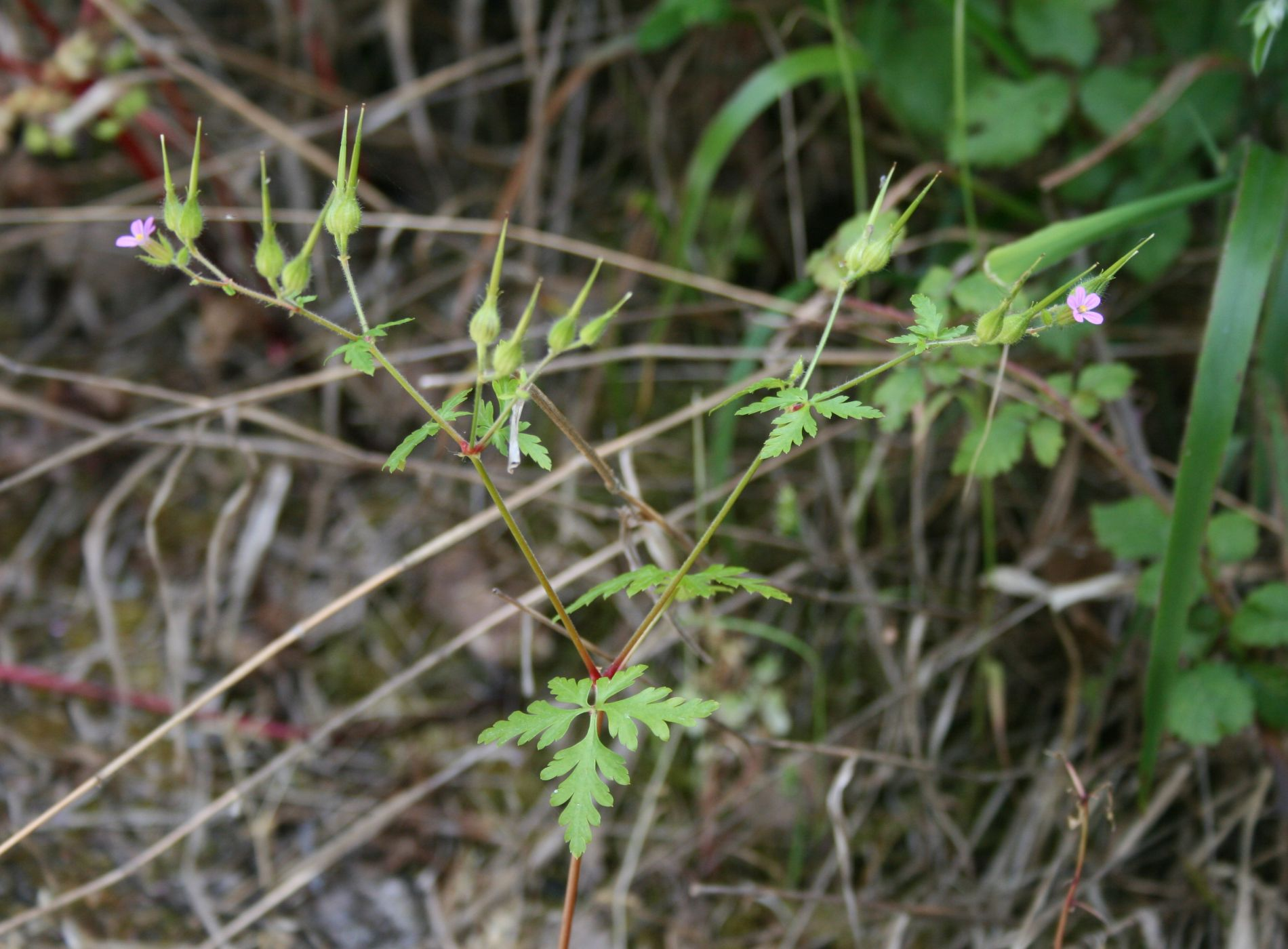
Geranium purpureum, little robin

- Geranium paishanense
- Geranium palcaense
- Geranium pallidifolium
- Geranium palmatipartitum
- Geranium palmatum – Canary Island geranium
- Geranium paludosum
- Geranium palustre – marsh cranesbill
- Geranium pamiricum
- Geranium papuanum
- Geranium paramicola
- Geranium parodii
- Geranium patagonicum
- Geranium pavonianum
- Geranium peloponnesiacum
- Geranium persicum
- Geranium peruvianum
- Geranium petri-davisii
- Geranium pflanzii
- Geranium phaeum – dusky cranesbill, mourning widow
- Geranium philippii
- Geranium pichinchense
- Geranium pilgerianum
- Geranium pinetophilum
- Geranium piurense
- Geranium platyanthum
- Geranium platypetalum – broad-petaled geranium
- Geranium platyrenifolium
- Geranium pogonanthum
- Geranium polyanthes
- Geranium ponticum
- Geranium potentillifolium
- Geranium potentilloides – cinquefoil geranium, native carrot (Australia)
- Geranium potosinum
- Geranium pratense – meadow cranesbill
- Geranium pringlei
- Geranium procurrens Yeo
- Geranium pseudofarreri
- Geranium pseudosibiricum
- Geranium psilostemon – Armenian cranesbill
- Geranium pulchrum
- Geranium purpureum Vill. – little robin
- Geranium pusillum – small-flowered cranesbill, small geranium
- Geranium pylzowianum
- Geranium pyrenaicum Burm.f. – hedgerow cranesbill, hedgerow geranium

== R ==
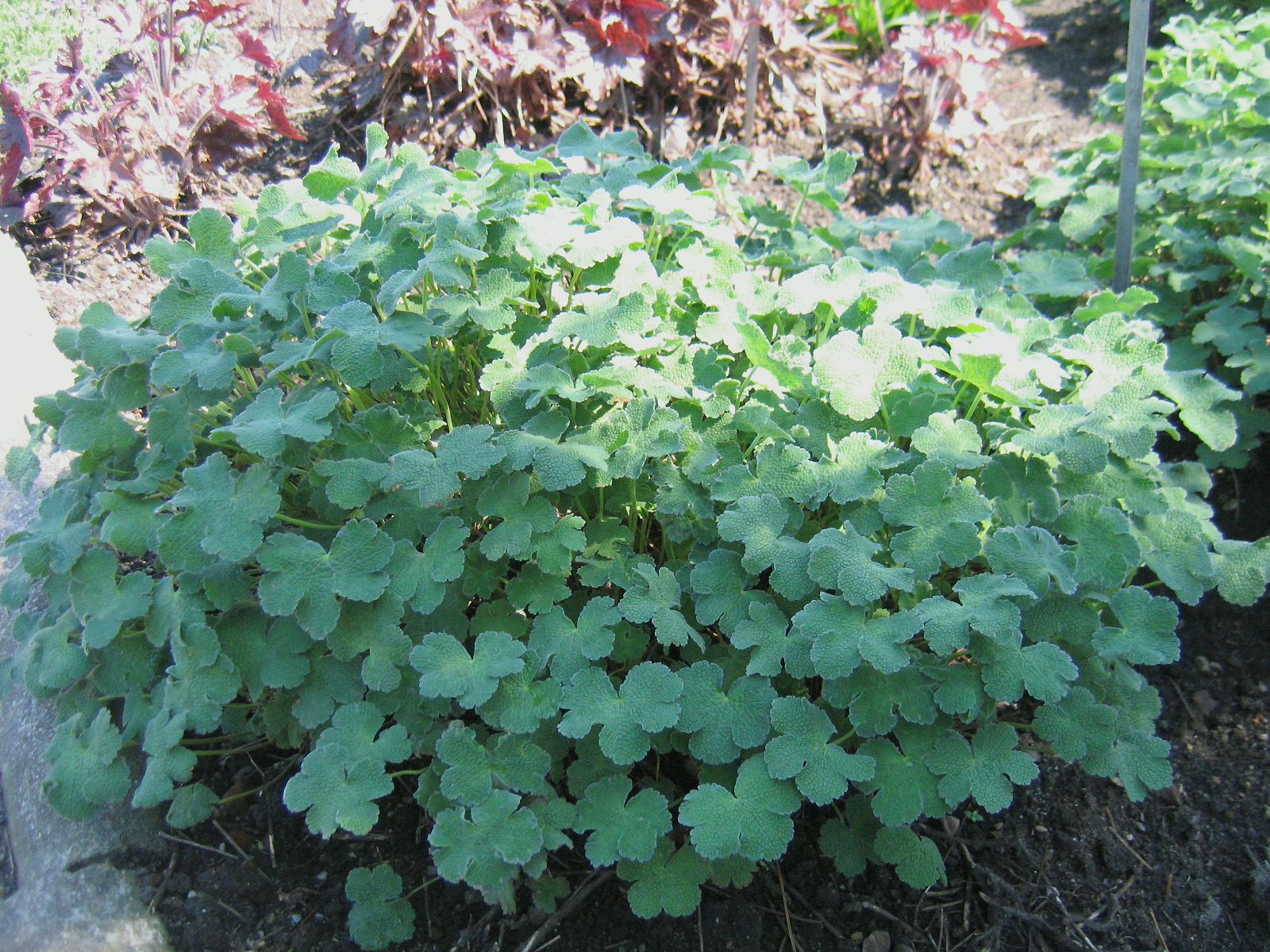
Geranium renardii

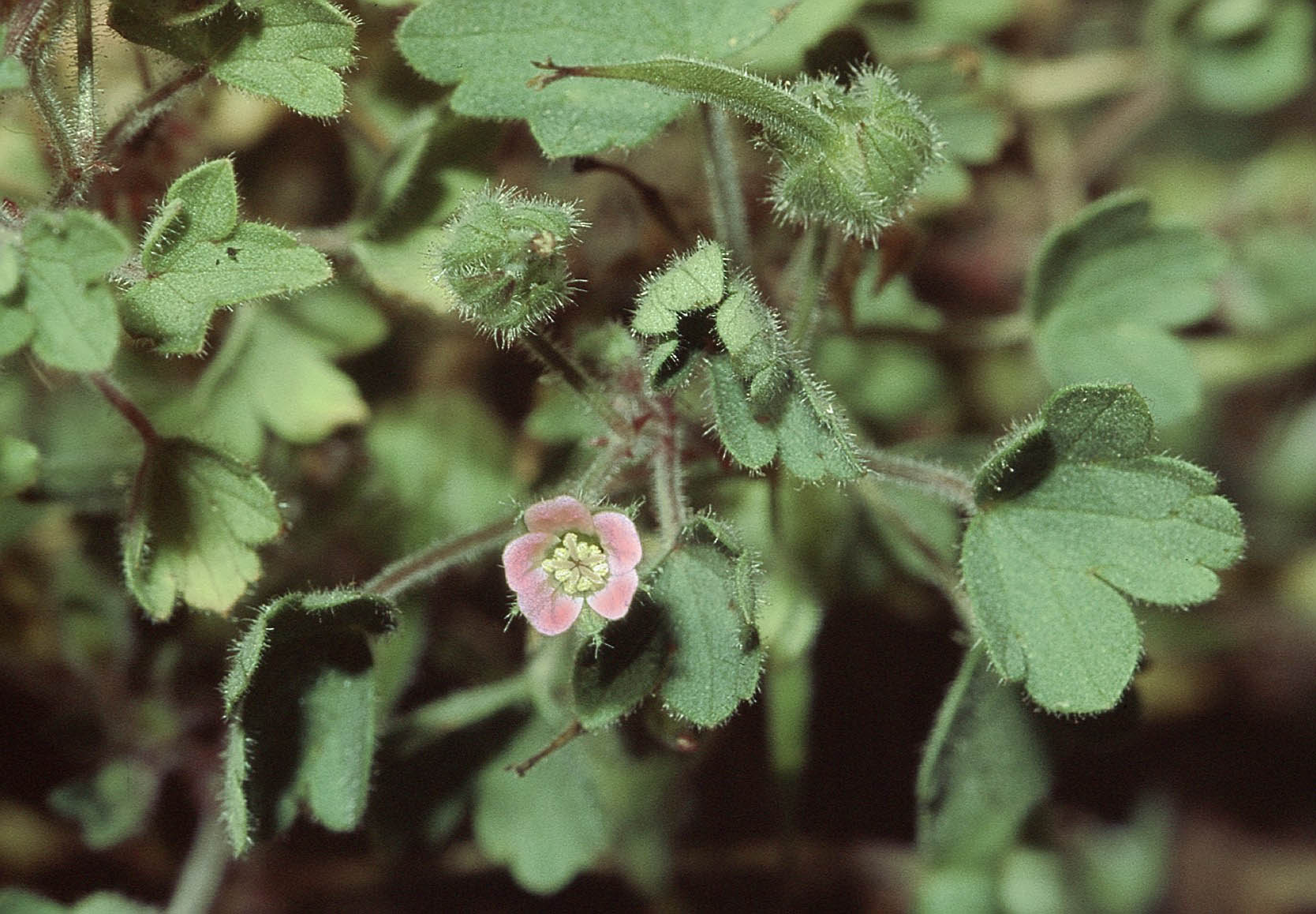
Geranium rotundifolium, round-leaved cranesbill

- Geranium raimondii
- Geranium rapulum
- Geranium rectum
- Geranium reflexum – reflexed cranesbill
- Geranium refractum
- Geranium regelii
- Geranium reinii
- Geranium renardii
- Geranium renifolium
- Geranium repens
- Geranium reptans
- Geranium retectum
- Geranium retrorsum – common cranesbill, New Zealand geranium
- Geranium reuteri – giant geranium
- Geranium rhomboidale
- Geranium richardsonii – Richardson's geranium
- Geranium × riversleaianum
- Geranium rivulare
- Geranium robertianum – herb robert, robert geranium
- Geranium robustipes
- Geranium robustum
- Geranium rosthornii
- Geranium rotundifolium – round-leaved cranesbill, roundleaf geranium
- Geranium rubescens – greater herb-robert
- Geranium rubifolium
- Geranium rubricum
- Geranium ruizii
- Geranium rupicola
- Geranium ruprechtii

== S ==
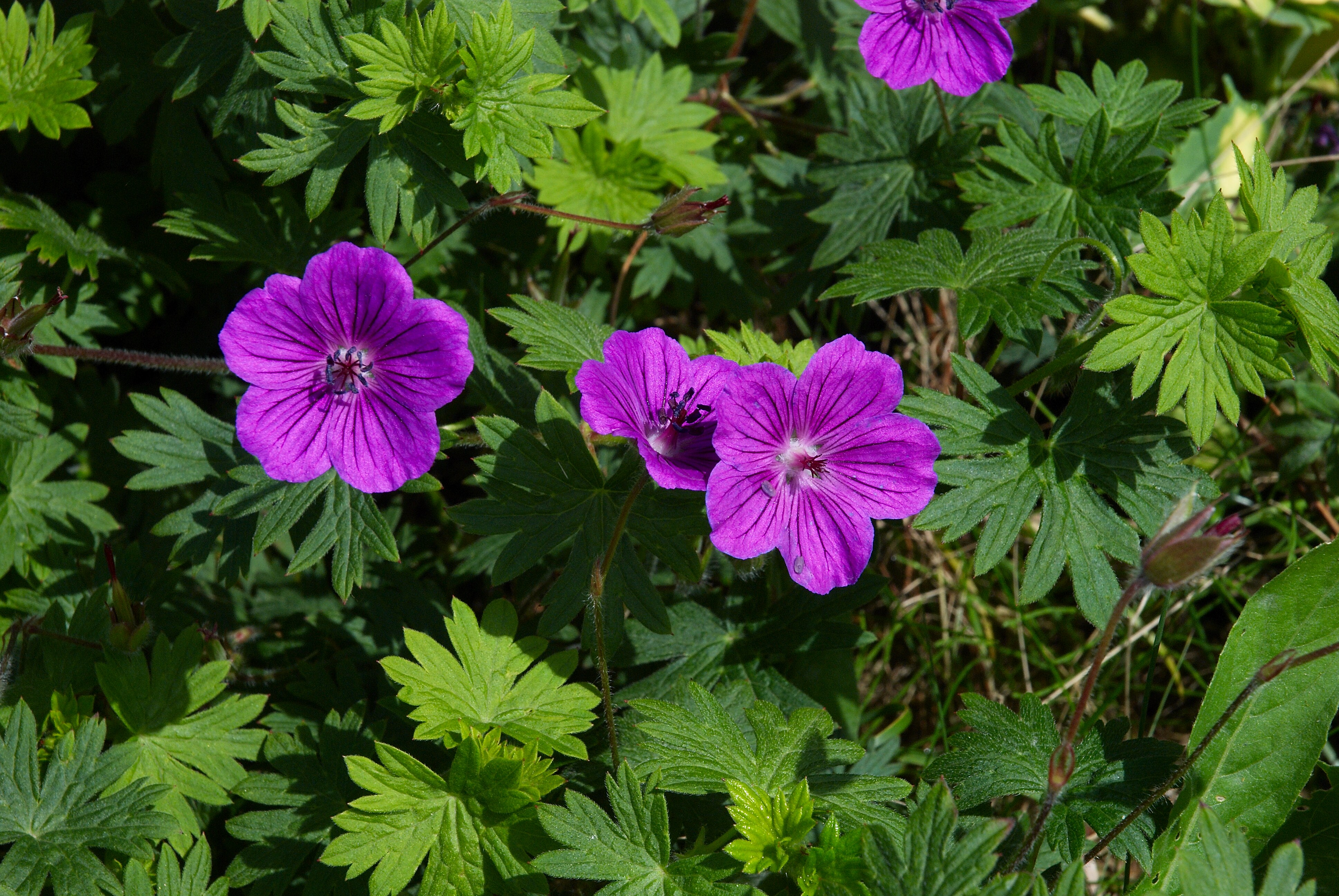
Geranium sanguineum, bloody cranesbill

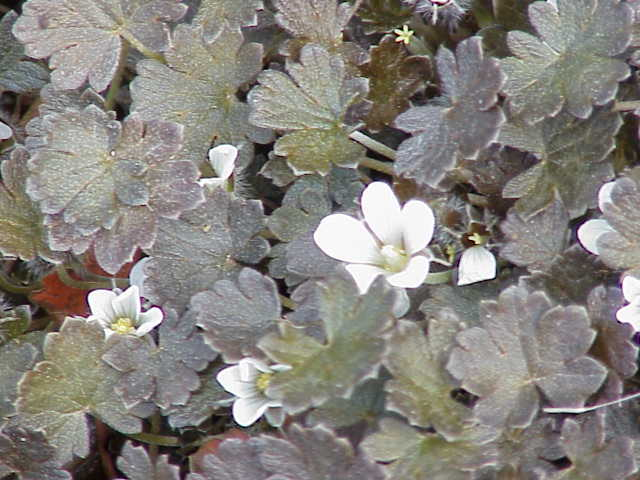
Geranium sessiliflorum cv. 'Nigrum'

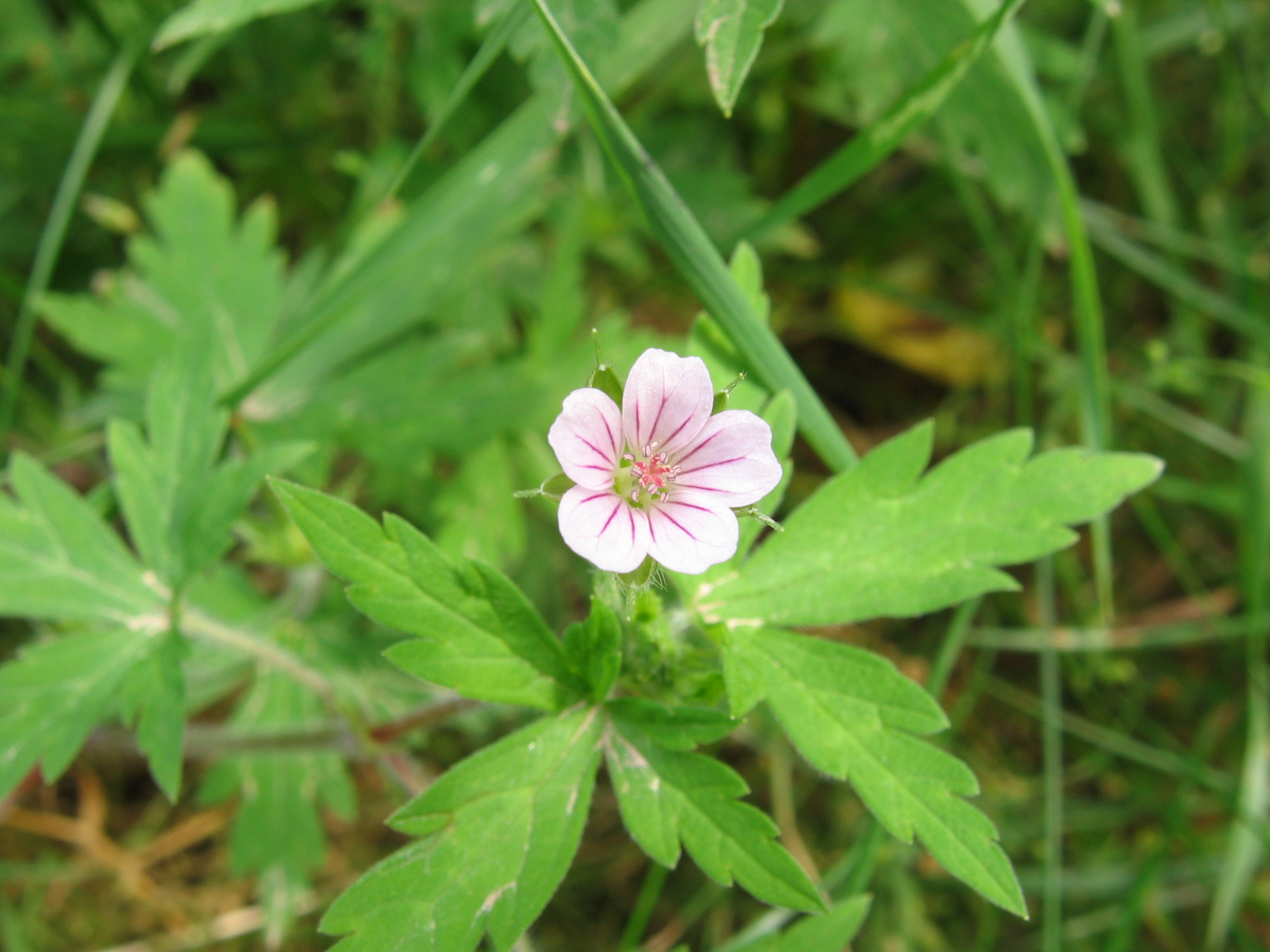
Geranium sibiricum, Siberian geranium

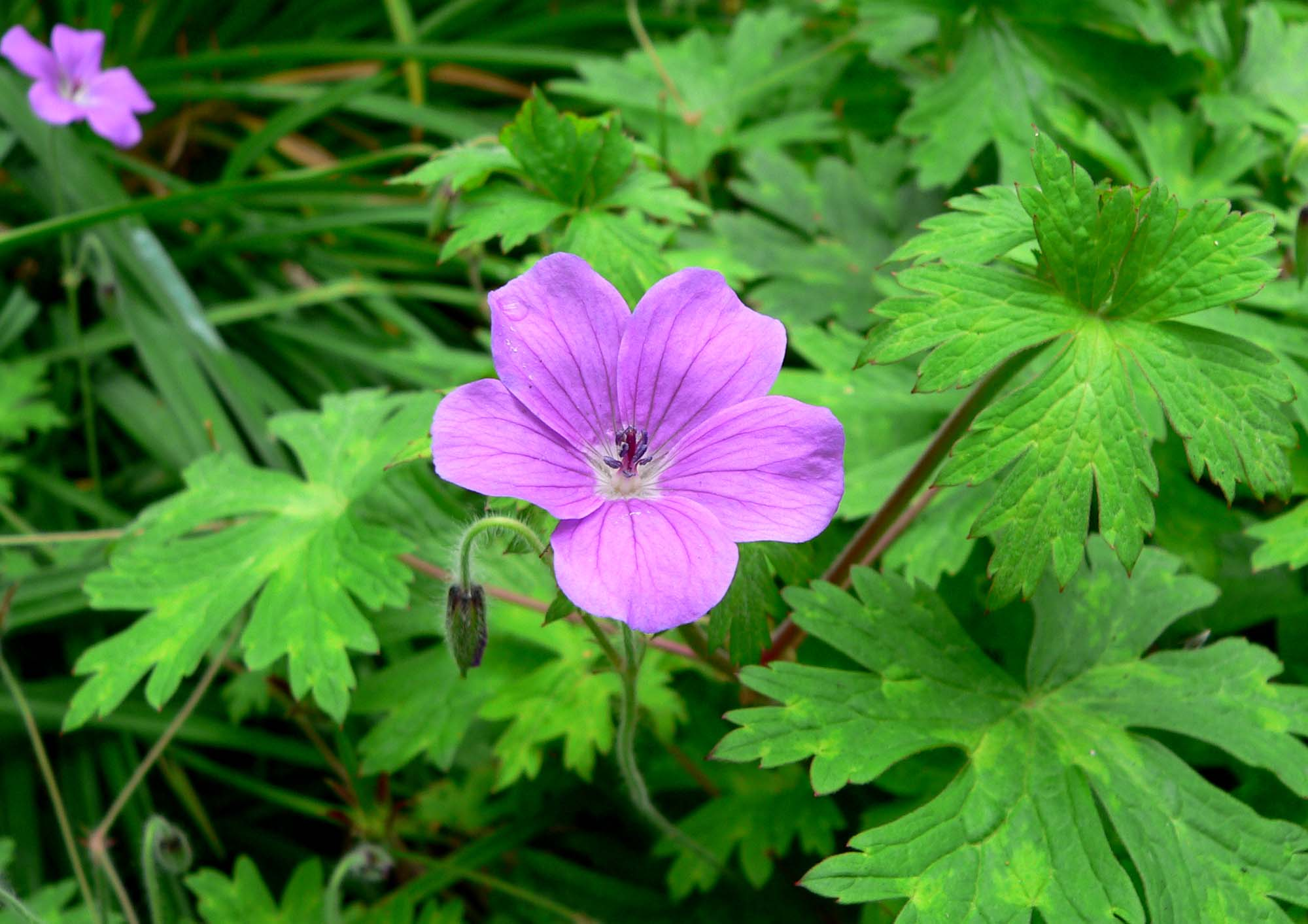
Geranium swatense

- Geranium sanguineum L. – bloody cranesbill, bloody geranium
- Geranium santacruzense
- Geranium santanderiense
- Geranium saxatile
- Geranium schiedeanum
- Geranium schimpffii
- Geranium schlechteri
- Geranium schultzei
- Geranium scissum
- Geranium scullyi
- Geranium sebosum
- Geranium seemannii
- Geranium selloi
- Geranium sepalo-roseum
- Geranium sericeum
- Geranium sessiliflorum
- Geranium shensianum
- Geranium shikokianum
- Geranium siamense
- Geranium sibbaldioides
- Geranium sibiricum – Siberian geranium
- Geranium sinense
- Geranium skottsbergii
- Geranium smithianum
- Geranium soboliferum
- Geranium sodiroanum
- Geranium solanderi – Solander's geranium
- Geranium solitarium
- Geranium sophiae
- Geranium soratae
- Geranium sparsiflorum
- Geranium squamosum
- Geranium staffordianum
- Geranium stapfianum
- Geranium stoloniferum
- Geranium stramineum
- Geranium strictipes
- Geranium stuebelii
- Geranium subacutum
- Geranium subargenteum
- Geranium subcaulescens
- Geranium subcompositum
- Geranium subglabrum
- Geranium sublaevispermum
- Geranium subnudicaule
- Geranium subscandens
- Geranium subsericeum
- Geranium subulato-stipulatum
- Geranium subumbelliforme
- Geranium superbum
- Geranium suzukii
- Geranium swatense
- Geranium sylvaticum – wood cranesbill, woodland geranium

== T ==
- Geranium tafiense
- Geranium tanii
- Geranium texanum – Texas geranium
- Geranium thessalum
- Geranium thunbergii – Thunberg's geranium
- Geranium tiguense
- Geranium totorense
- Geranium tracyi
- Geranium transbaicalicum
- Geranium traversii
- Geranium trianae
- Geranium trilophum
- Geranium tripartitum
- Geranium trolliifolium
- Geranium tuberaria
- Geranium tuberosum – tuberous cranesbill

== U ==
- Geranium umbelliforme
- Geranium unguiculatum
- Geranium uralense

== V ==
- Geranium vagans
- Geranium venezuelae
- Geranium venturianum
- Geranium versicolor – pencilled cranesbill, veiny geranium
- Geranium viscosissimum – sticky purple geranium
- Geranium vulcanicola

== W ==
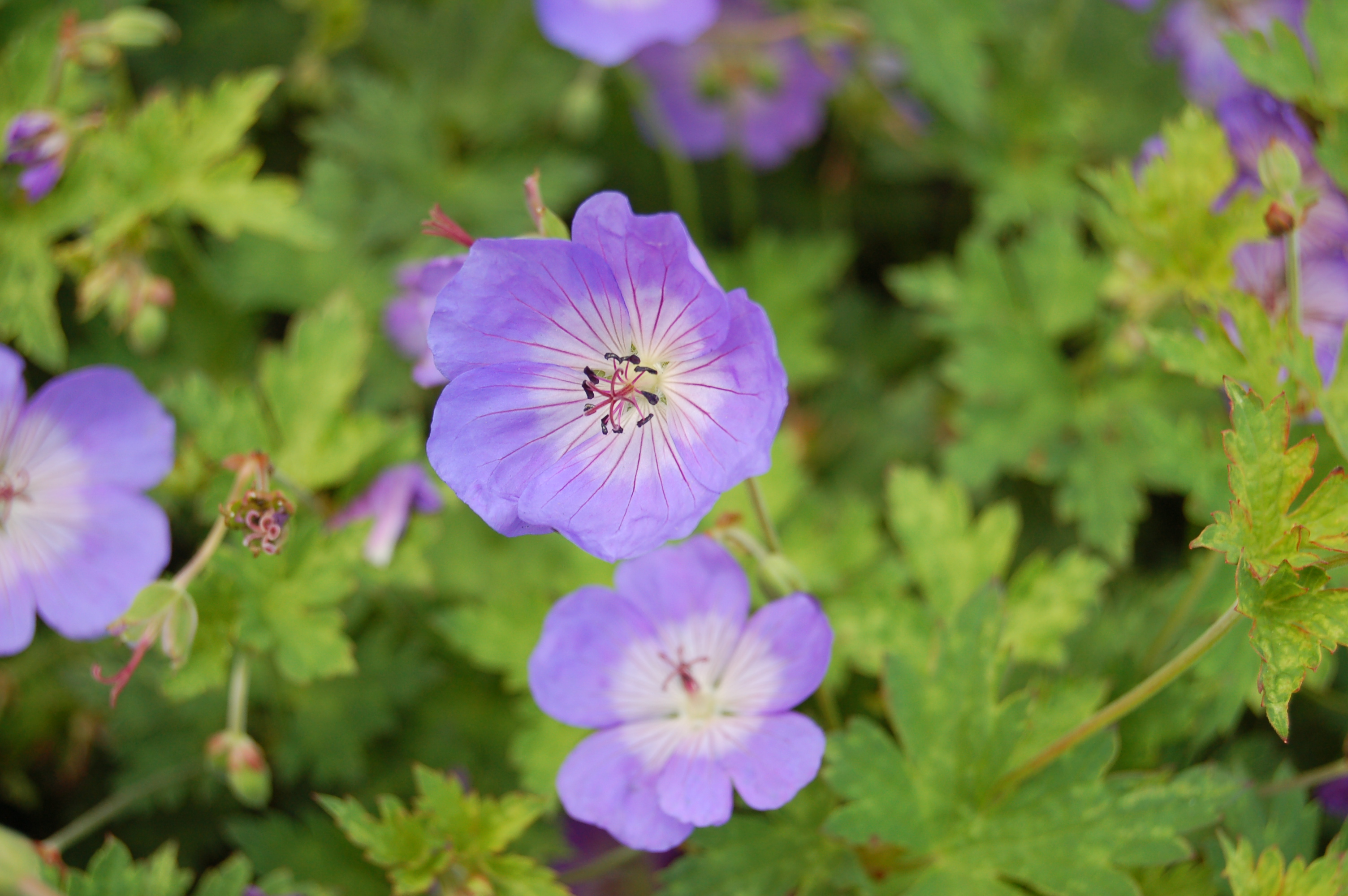
Geranium wallichianum 'Buxton's Blue'

- Geranium wakkerstroomianum
- Geranium wallichianum
- Geranium wardii
- Geranium weberbauerianum
- Geranium weddellii
- Geranium whartonianum
- Geranium wilfordii
- Geranium wilhelminae
- Geranium wislizeni – Huachuca geranium, Huachuca Mountain geranium
- Geranium wlassovianum

== Y ==
- Geranium yaanense
- Geranium yeoi
- Geranium yesoense
- Geranium yoshinoi
- Geranium yuexiense
- Geranium yunnanense
