= Geranium × riversleaianum =

Scientific classification
- Kingdom: Plantae
- Clade: Tracheophytes
- Clade: Angiosperms
- Clade: Eudicots
- Clade: Rosids
- Order: Geraniales
- Family: Geraniaceae
- Genus: Geranium
- Species: G. × riversleaianum

Binomial name
- Geranium × riversleaianum P.F.Yeo

Species of plant

Geranium × riversleaianum is an artificial hybrid species of flowering plant in the family Geraniaceae. Its parents are Geranium endressii (from the Pyrenees) and Geranium traversii (from the Chatham Islands of New Zealand). A trailing perennial reaching 30 cm (12 in), its cultivar 'Russell Prichard' has gained the Royal Horticultural Society's Award of Garden Merit, and is widely available from commercial nurseries.
