= Geranium umbelliforme =

Scientific classification
- Kingdom: Plantae
- Clade: Tracheophytes
- Clade: Angiosperms
- Clade: Eudicots
- Clade: Rosids
- Order: Geraniales
- Family: Geraniaceae
- Genus: Geranium
- Species: G. umbelliforme

Binomial name
- Geranium umbelliforme Franchet

Species of flowering plant

Geranium umbelliforme is a plant species native to central Sichuan and Yunnan, China at elevations of 2,800–3,200 m (9,200–10,500 ft).
