= Geranium rectum =

Scientific classification
- Kingdom: Plantae
- Clade: Tracheophytes
- Clade: Angiosperms
- Clade: Eudicots
- Clade: Rosids
- Order: Geraniales
- Family: Geraniaceae
- Genus: Geranium
- Species: G. rectum

Binomial name
- Geranium rectum Trautv.

Synonyms
- Geranium rectum var. glabratum Trautv.; Geranium rectum var. villosulum Trautv.; Geranium rectum var. villosum Regel

Species of plant

Geranium rectum is a species of flowering plant in the family Geraniaceae. It is native to Kazakhstan, Uzbekistan, Xinjiang, and the western Himalayas. A perennial reaching 22 to 84 cm (9 to 33 in), it is typically found in meadows and woodlands at elevations from 1,400 to 2,400 m (4,600 to 7,900 ft). It may be available from commercial nurseries.
