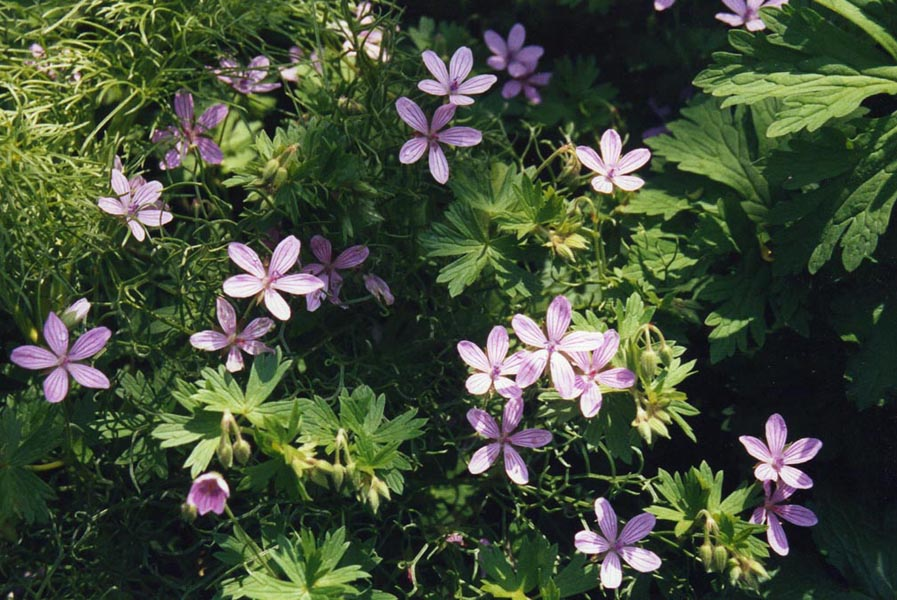
- In bloom
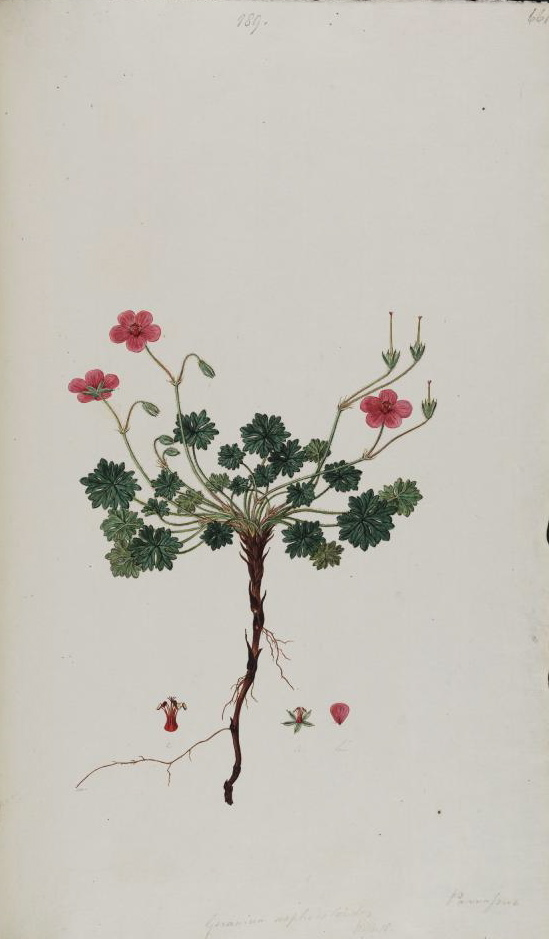
- Botanical illustration

Scientific classification
- Kingdom: Plantae
- Clade: Tracheophytes
- Clade: Angiosperms
- Clade: Eudicots
- Clade: Rosids
- Order: Geraniales
- Family: Geraniaceae
- Genus: Geranium
- Species: G. asphodeloides

Binomial name
- Geranium asphodeloides Burm.f.

Synonyms
- List: Geranium asphodeloides subsp. nemorosum (Ten.) Fritsch; Geranium asphodeloides var. nemorosum (Ten.) Boiss.; Geranium asphodeloides subsp. pallens Woronow; Geranium fasciculatum Pančić; Geranium haemanthum Willd. ex Spreng.; Geranium nemorosum Ten.; Geranium orientale Mill.; Geranium pallens M.Bieb.; Geranium pyrenaicum var. nemorosum (Ten.) DC.; Geranium tauricum Rupr.

= Geranium asphodeloides =

Species of plant

Geranium asphodeloides, the asphodel cranesbill, is a species of flowering plant in the family Geraniaceae. It is native to southeastern Europe, Crimea, the Transcaucasus, Turkey, and Lebanon/Syria. A spreading perennial, it is recommended as a pollinator-attracting ground cover, for rock and gravel gardens, and for planting beneath roses.

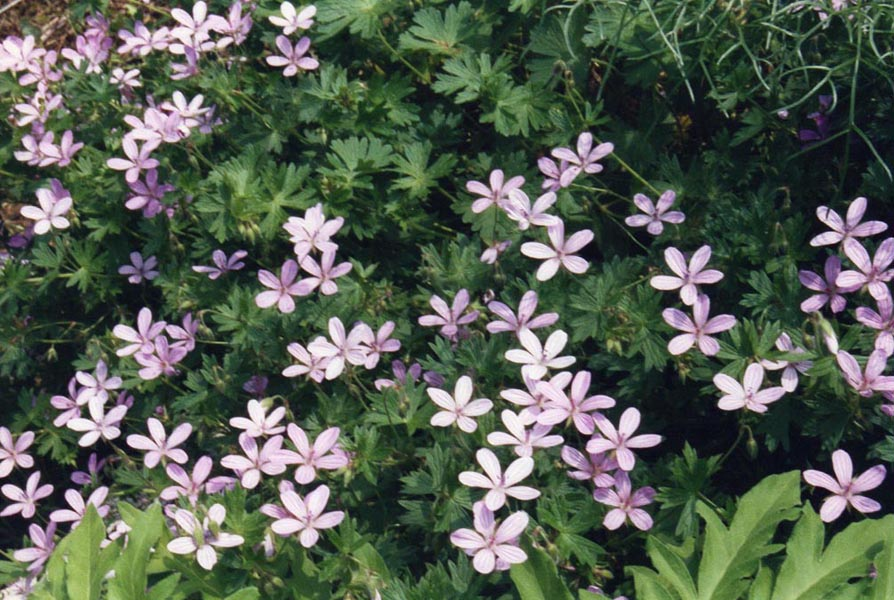
Profusely flowering
