= Geranium aculeolatum =

Scientific classification
- Kingdom: Plantae
- Clade: Tracheophytes
- Clade: Angiosperms
- Clade: Eudicots
- Clade: Rosids
- Order: Geraniales
- Family: Geraniaceae
- Genus: Geranium
- Species: G. aculeolatum

Binomial name
- Geranium aculeolatum Oliv.

Species of flowering plant

Geranium aculeolatum is a herbaceous plant species in the family Geraniaceae. It is native to Africa, where it is found in tropical regions. It is found in forested areas in clearings and often has climbing or trailing stems that root at the nodes.
