= Geranium exallum =

Conservation status
- Endangered (IUCN 3.1)

Scientific classification
- Kingdom: Plantae
- Clade: Tracheophytes
- Clade: Angiosperms
- Clade: Eudicots
- Clade: Rosids
- Order: Geraniales
- Family: Geraniaceae
- Genus: Geranium
- Species: G. exallum

Binomial name
- Geranium exallum H.E.Moore

Species of flowering plant

Geranium exallum is a species of flowering plant in the family Geraniaceae. It is endemic to Ecuador. Its natural habitat is subtropical or tropical high-elevation shrubland.
