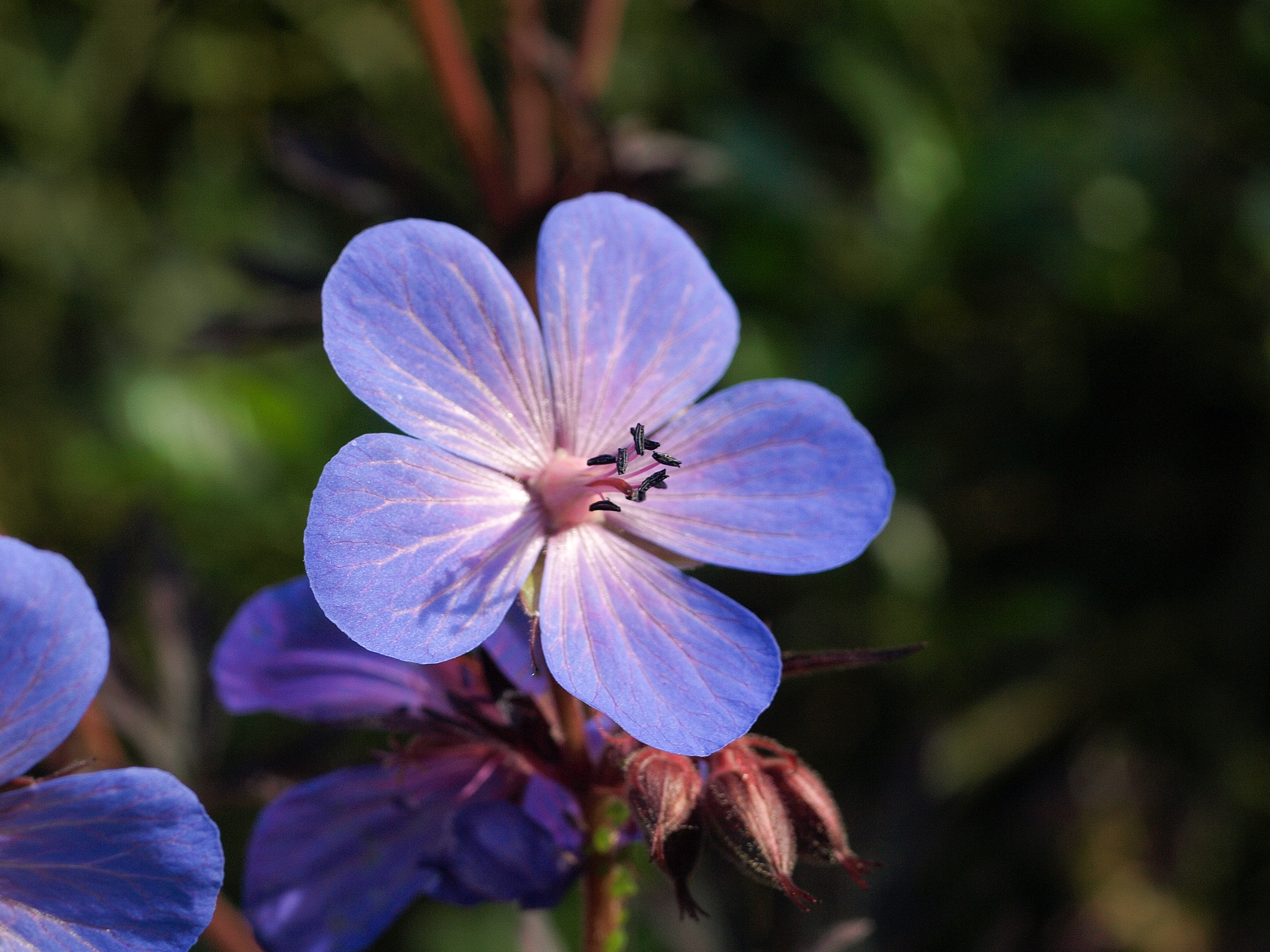

Scientific classification
- Kingdom: Plantae
- Clade: Tracheophytes
- Clade: Angiosperms
- Clade: Eudicots
- Clade: Rosids
- Order: Geraniales
- Family: Geraniaceae
- Genus: Geranium
- Species: G. himalayense

Binomial name
- Geranium himalayense Klotzsch

= Geranium himalayense =

Species of flowering plant

Geranium himalayense (common names Himalayan crane's-bill or lilac cranesbill) is a species of hardy flowering herbaceous perennial plant in the genus Geranium, family Geraniaceae. It is native to West Himalaya, Afghanistan, Kyrgyzstan, Nepal, Pakistan, Tajikistan, Tibet, and Uzbekistan.

It has a sprawling habit, violet-blue flowers and deeply cut palmate foliage. It grows in alpine and subalpine meadows.
