= Geranium libanoticum =

Scientific classification
- Kingdom: Plantae
- Clade: Tracheophytes
- Clade: Angiosperms
- Clade: Eudicots
- Clade: Rosids
- Order: Geraniales
- Family: Geraniaceae
- Genus: Geranium
- Species: G. libanoticum

Binomial name
- Geranium libanoticum Schenk

Species of flowering plant

Geranium libanoticum, commonly known as the Lebanese cranesbill, is a species of hardy, perennial herbaceous plant within the family Geraniaceae. The species is a specialized geophyte native to the temperate montane biomes of the Eastern Mediterranean, wnative to south-central Turkey (Anatolia), western Syria, and Lebanon. It grows in rocky mountain habitats and forest clearings.

== Taxonomy and nomenclature ==
The species was described by Heinrich Wilhelm Schenk in 1840. The formal diagnosis appeared in his botanical work detailing Near Eastern plant collections, Plantarum Species Quas in Itinere Per Orientem Facto Colegit Dr. Fr. Schubert.

In 1856, Edmond Boissier and Charles Immanuel Blanche used the name Geranium libanoticum for a different species. In 1955, Peter Hadland Davis renamed Boissier and Blanche's species Geranium libani. G. libanoticum and G. libani are separate species, although their distributions overlap in parts of the Levant.

== Description ==
Geranium libanoticum is a rhizomatous perennial, 10–40 cm (3.9–15.7 in) tall. The stem is simple or sparsely branched and covered with spreading hairs. Unlike Geranium tuberosum, G. libanoticum lacks basal leaves at flowering. A pair of opposite leaves occurs near the middle of the stem. The leaves are deeply divided into five cuneate segments, themselves divided into narrow, subacute lobes.

The blooming cycle takes place from late spring through early summer, typically peaking between May and July. The inflorescence is dichotomously branched, with one flower on each peduncle. The flowers are actinomorphic and hermaphroditic. The corolla features five broad, obcordate (heart-shaped) petals of a deep purple-violet color, which are structurally twice as long as the supporting sepals.

== Distribution and habitat ==
The species occurs in Lebanon, western Syria, and south-central Turkey. Populations are documented along the central and southern reaches of the Taurus Mountains and the Amanus range in Turkey, the volcanic plateaus of Jabal al-Arab in southeastern Syria, and both the Mount Lebanon and Anti-Lebanon mountain chains.

It grows in mountain meadows, rocky places and forest clearings, including habitats with Abies cilicica and cedar of Lebanon (Cedrus libani), and kermes oak (Quercus coccifera). In Lebanon, the species has been recorded in the Al-Shouf Biosphere Reserve.
