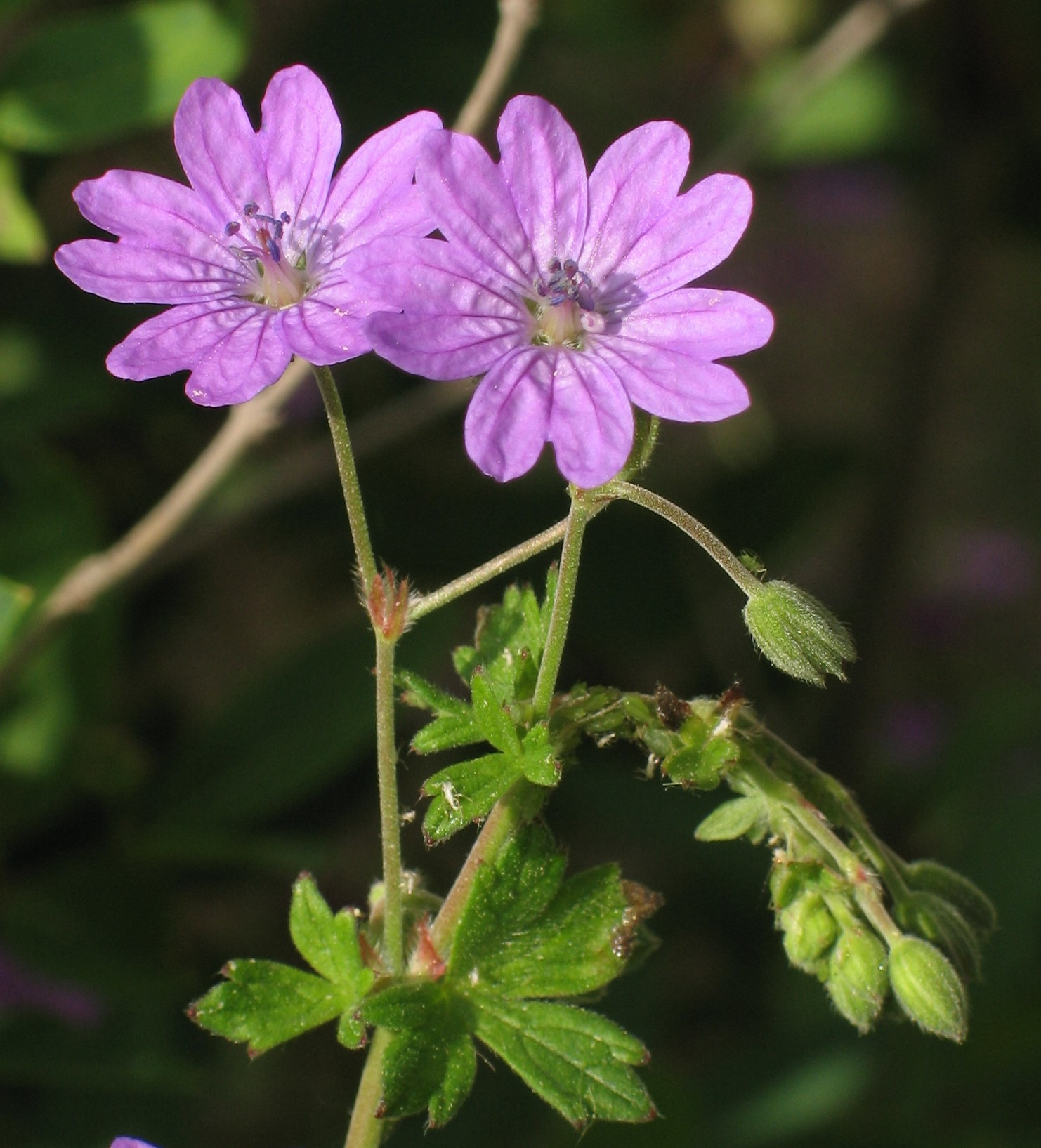

Scientific classification
- Kingdom: Plantae
- Clade: Embryophytes
- Clade: Tracheophytes
- Clade: Angiosperms
- Clade: Eudicots
- Clade: Rosids
- Order: Geraniales
- Family: Geraniaceae
- Genus: Geranium
- Species: G. pyrenaicum

Binomial name
- Geranium pyrenaicum Burm.f.

= Geranium pyrenaicum =

Species of flowering plant

Geranium pyrenaicum, otherwise known as hedgerow cranesbill or mountain cranesbill is a perennial species of plant in the family Geraniaceae. It can be found on roadside verges and along hedgerows.

== Distribution ==
It is probably introduced in England and Wales, where it is fairly common. Elsewhere, it can be found in the southern Alps, the Pyrenees and the Caucasus.
