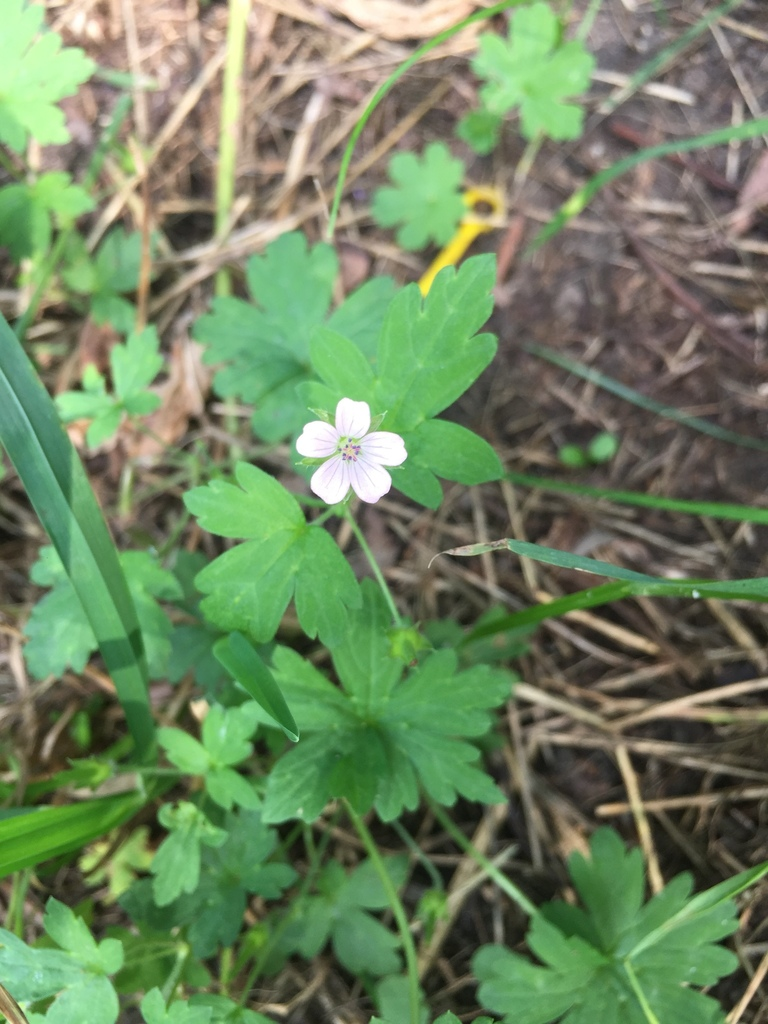

Scientific classification
- Kingdom: Plantae
- Clade: Tracheophytes
- Clade: Angiosperms
- Clade: Eudicots
- Clade: Rosids
- Order: Geraniales
- Family: Geraniaceae
- Genus: Geranium
- Species: G. sibiricum

Binomial name
- Geranium sibiricum L.

= Geranium sibiricum =

Species of flowering plant

Geranium sibiricum is a species of perennial flowering plant belonging to the family Geraniaceae.

Its native range is Romania to Temperate Asia.

== Description ==
Geranium sibiricum is a small plant, usually from 20 to 60 cm in height but can be shorter or taller depending on the conditions it grows in. It prefers open places, such as forest margins, meadows, fields, or urban areas, but can grow in shade below the bushes. Stems are very thin, but heavily branched. The leaves are small (1,5-5 cm in diameter), and, typical for geraniums, divided into several lobes.
