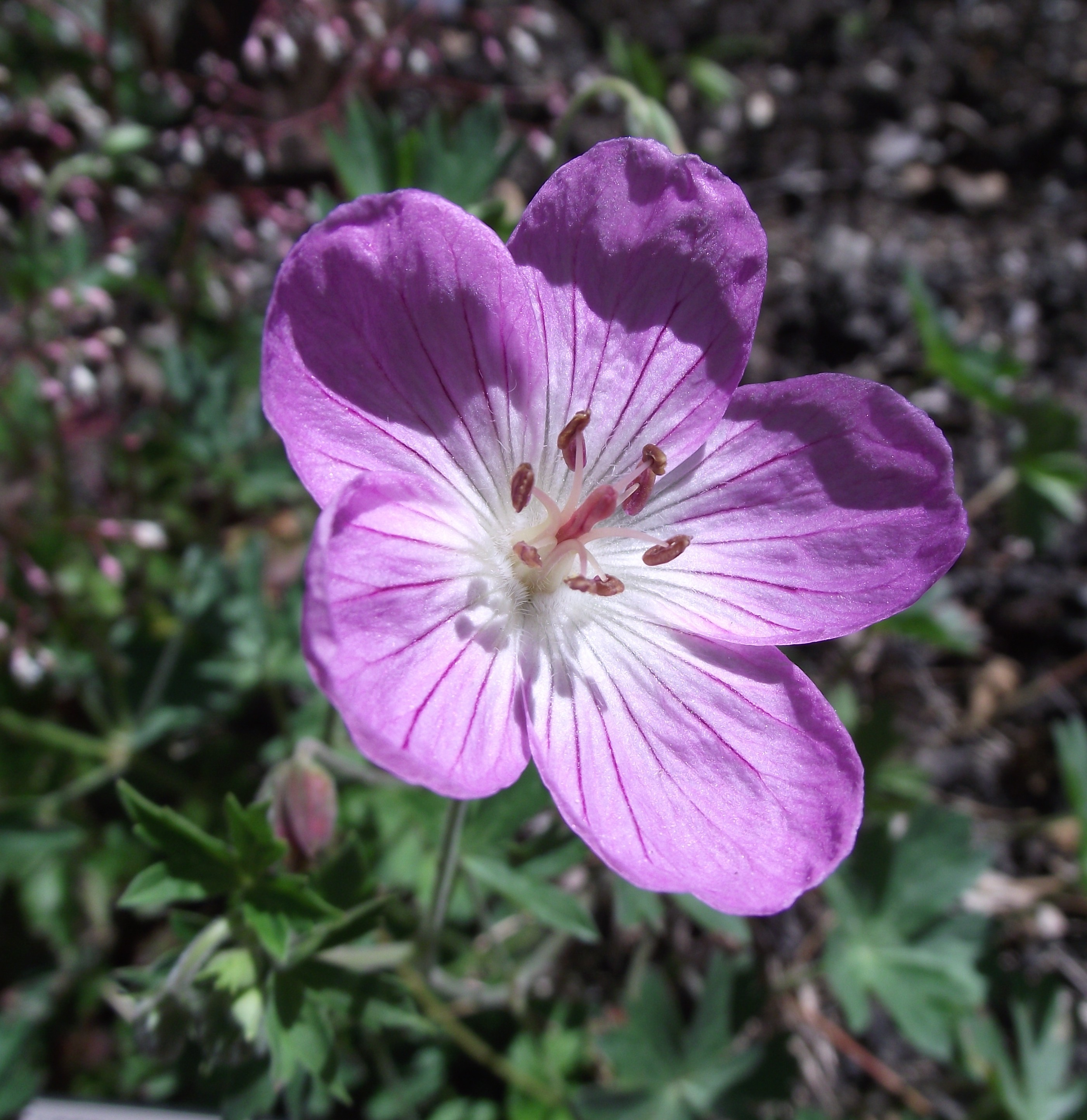

Conservation status
- Apparently Secure (NatureServe)

Scientific classification
- Kingdom: Plantae
- Clade: Tracheophytes
- Clade: Angiosperms
- Clade: Eudicots
- Clade: Rosids
- Order: Geraniales
- Family: Geraniaceae
- Genus: Geranium
- Species: G. californicum

Binomial name
- Geranium californicum G.N.Jones & F.F.Jones

Synonyms
- Geranium concinnum

= Geranium californicum =

Species of flowering plant

Geranium californicum is a species of Geranium known by the common name California cranesbill. It is endemic to California, where it grows in the Sierra Nevada and coastal ranges in the southern part of the state.

== Description ==
This is a perennial herb topping half a metre in maximum height. Its thin, hairy stems have many wide, palmate leaves divided into several segments which are subdivided into small lobes. Flowers appear singly or in pairs on small stalks. Each has five pointed sepals beneath five rounded to oval-shaped petals which may have slight notches in the ends. The petals are up to 1.5 centimetres (0.59 in) long and white to pale pink or lavender with deeper lavender veining.
