= Geranium chimborazense =

Conservation status
- Vulnerable (IUCN 3.1)

Scientific classification
- Kingdom: Plantae
- Clade: Tracheophytes
- Clade: Angiosperms
- Clade: Eudicots
- Clade: Rosids
- Order: Geraniales
- Family: Geraniaceae
- Genus: Geranium
- Species: G. chimborazense

Binomial name
- Geranium chimborazense R.Knuth

Species of flowering plant

Geranium chimborazense is a species of plant in the family Geraniaceae. It is endemic to Ecuador. Its natural habitat is subtropical or tropical high-altitude grassland.
