= Geranium aristatum =

Scientific classification
- Kingdom: Plantae
- Clade: Tracheophytes
- Clade: Angiosperms
- Clade: Eudicots
- Clade: Rosids
- Order: Geraniales
- Family: Geraniaceae
- Genus: Geranium
- Species: G. aristatum

Binomial name
- Geranium aristatum Freyn & Sint.

Species of plant

Geranium aristatum, the bearded cranesbill, is a species of flowering plant in the family Geraniaceae. It is native to the Balkans; southern Albania, southwestern Bulgaria, north-central Greece, and adjoining parts of the former Yugoslavia. An upright perennial reaching 60 cm (2 ft), it is available from commercial suppliers, with the Royal Horticultural Society considering it to be a good plant to attract pollinators.
