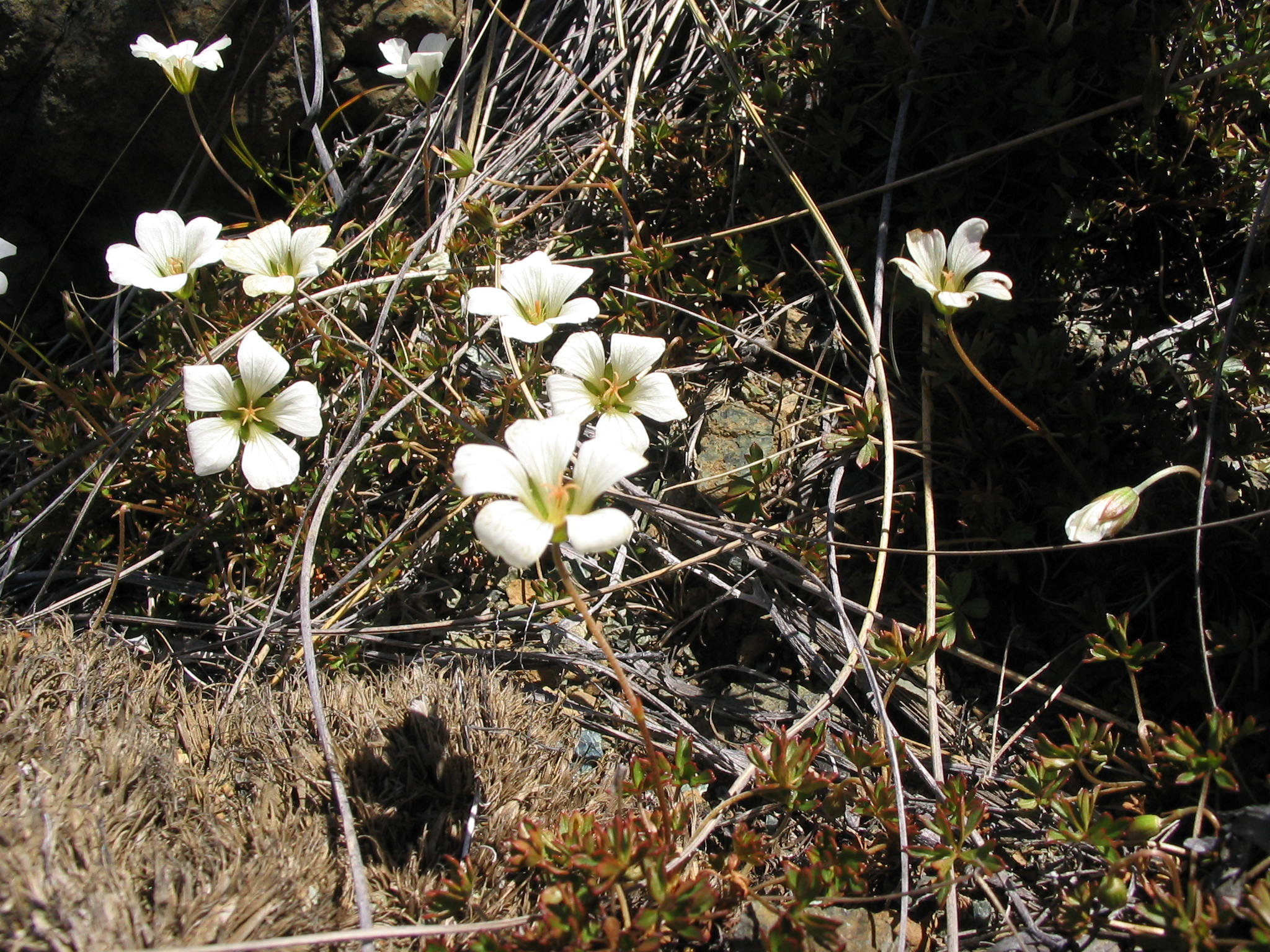

Conservation status
- Nationally Endangered (NZ TCS)

Scientific classification
- Kingdom: Plantae
- Clade: Tracheophytes
- Clade: Angiosperms
- Clade: Eudicots
- Clade: Rosids
- Order: Geraniales
- Family: Geraniaceae
- Genus: Geranium
- Species: G. rubricum

Binomial name
- Geranium rubricum Heenan & Courtney

= Geranium rubricum =

Plant species in the geranium family

Geranium rubricum (common name Red Hills geranium) is a species of perennial herb in the family Geraniaceae, native to the South Island of New Zealand, where it is found on ultramafic rock outcrops.

It was first described in 2017 by Peter Heenan and Shannel P. Courtney.

It is a "Nationally Endangered" species under New Zealand law.
