= Geranium vulcanicola =

Scientific classification
- Kingdom: Plantae
- Clade: Tracheophytes
- Clade: Angiosperms
- Clade: Eudicots
- Clade: Rosids
- Order: Geraniales
- Family: Geraniaceae
- Genus: Geranium
- Species: G. vulcanicola

Binomial name
- Geranium vulcanicola Small

Species of flowering plant

Geranium vulcanicola is a plant species native to central Mexico. Type locale is on the slopes of Ixtaccíhuatl (also spelled Iztaccíhuatl) Volcano east of Mexico City, on the boundary of the State of México and the State of Puebla.

Geranium vulcanicola is a perennial herb. Stems are spreading or decumbent, up to 40 cm (16 inches) long. Leaves are palmately 3-5-lobed, kidney-shaped to pentagonal in general outline, up to 4 cm (1.6 inches) across. Sepals are green, up to 7 mm (0.3 inches) long, tipped with awns. Petals are white, slightly long than the sepals.
