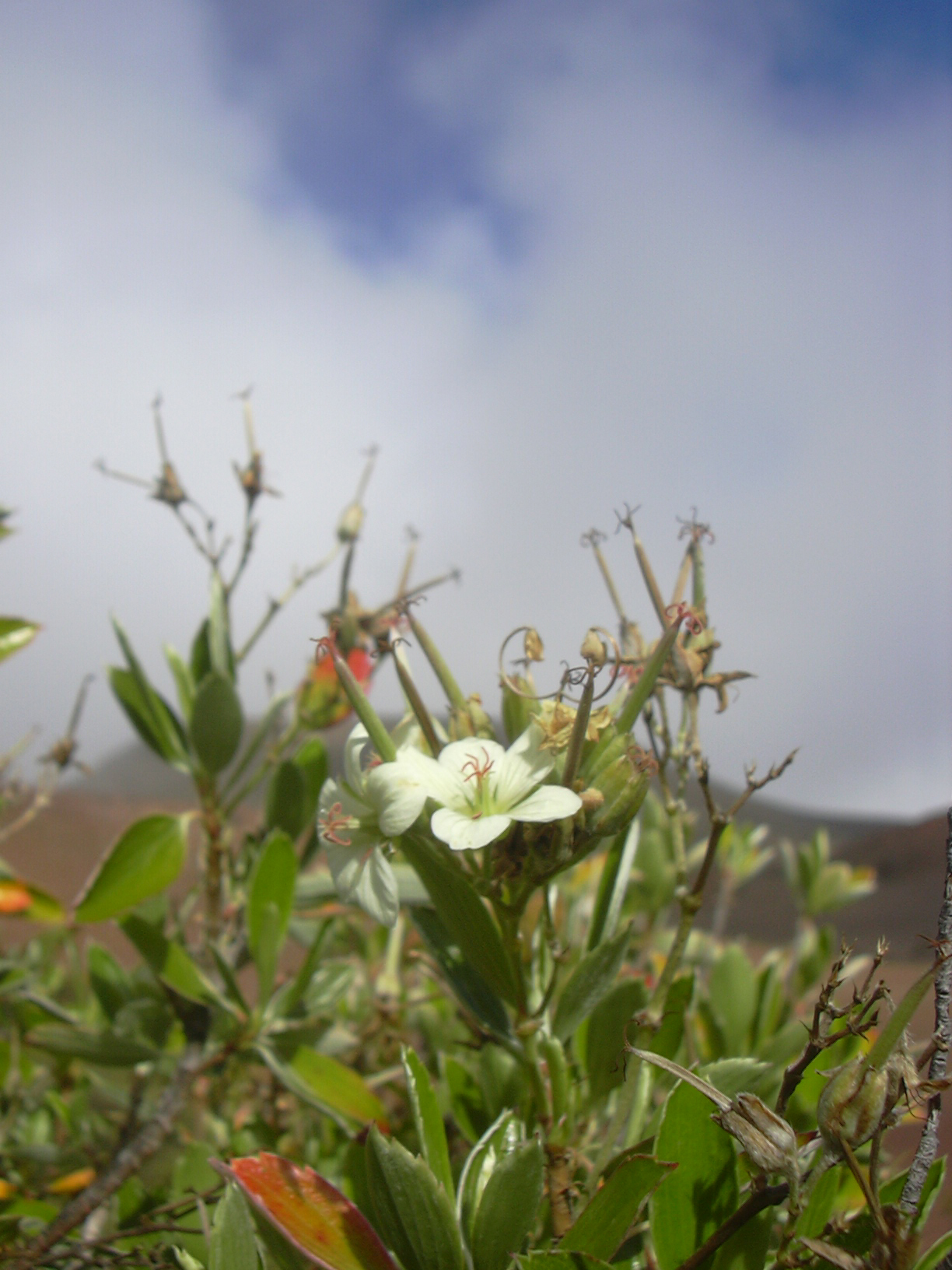

Conservation status
- Imperiled (NatureServe)

Scientific classification
- Kingdom: Plantae
- Clade: Tracheophytes
- Clade: Angiosperms
- Clade: Eudicots
- Clade: Rosids
- Order: Geraniales
- Family: Geraniaceae
- Genus: Geranium
- Species: G. multiflorum

Binomial name
- Geranium multiflorum A.Gray

= Geranium multiflorum =

Species of flowering plant

Geranium multiflorum is a rare species of geranium known by the common names manyflower geranium, or manyflowered cranesbill. It is endemic to Hawaii, where it is known only from Haleakalā, the main volcano on the island of Maui. It was federally listed as an endangered species in 1992. Like other Hawaiian geraniums, this plant is known as hinahina and nohoanu.

This plant is a shrub usually growing one or two meters tall but known to reach three. The flowers may be purple, pink, or white with purple veining and purple centers. The plant grows in forest and grassland habitat on the upper slopes of Haleakalā, in a subalpine climate. There are probably no more than 3000 individuals left.

The main threat to this species is the degradation of its habitat by feral pigs, feral goats, and non-native plant species invading the area.
