= Geranium libani =

Scientific classification
- Kingdom: Plantae
- Clade: Embryophytes
- Clade: Tracheophytes
- Clade: Angiosperms
- Clade: Eudicots
- Clade: Rosids
- Order: Geraniales
- Family: Geraniaceae
- Genus: Geranium
- Species: G. libani

Binomial name
- Geranium libani P.H.Davis

Species of flowering plant

Geranium libani, the Lebanese geranium, is a species of flowering plant in the family Geraniaceae, native to wooded mountains in Lebanon, Syria and central Turkey.

== Description ==
Geranium libani has a thick, branching rhizome; the ascending stems are hairy. This plant reaches on average 20–60 centimetres (7.9–23.6 inches) in height. The petiolate leaves have five lobes. The flowers have a diameter of 4 to 10 cm (1.6 to 3.9 in) and are purple. The flowering period extends from March through June. The 3 cm fruit is a capsule with pubescent valves.
