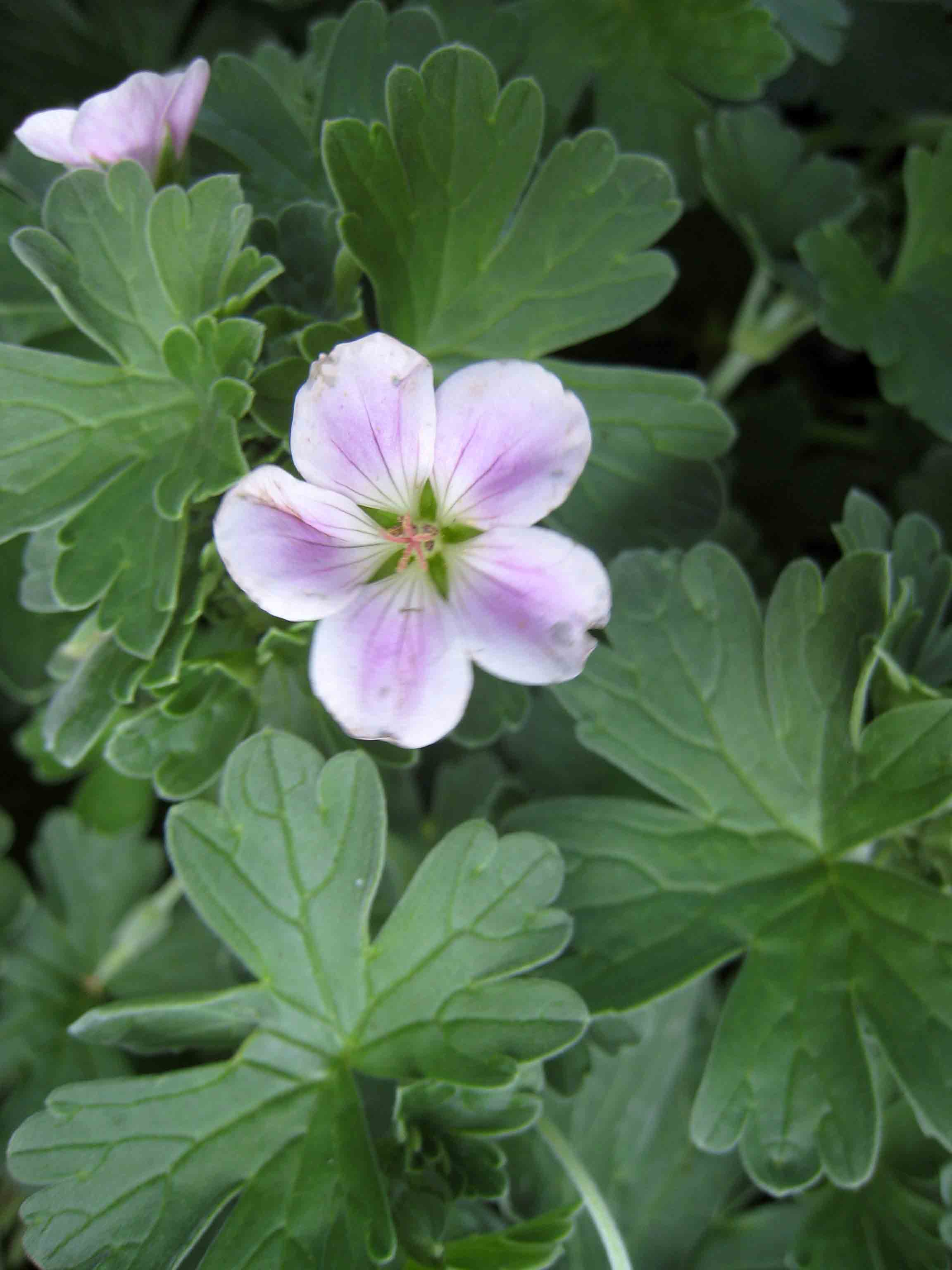
- At the Dunedin Botanic Garden
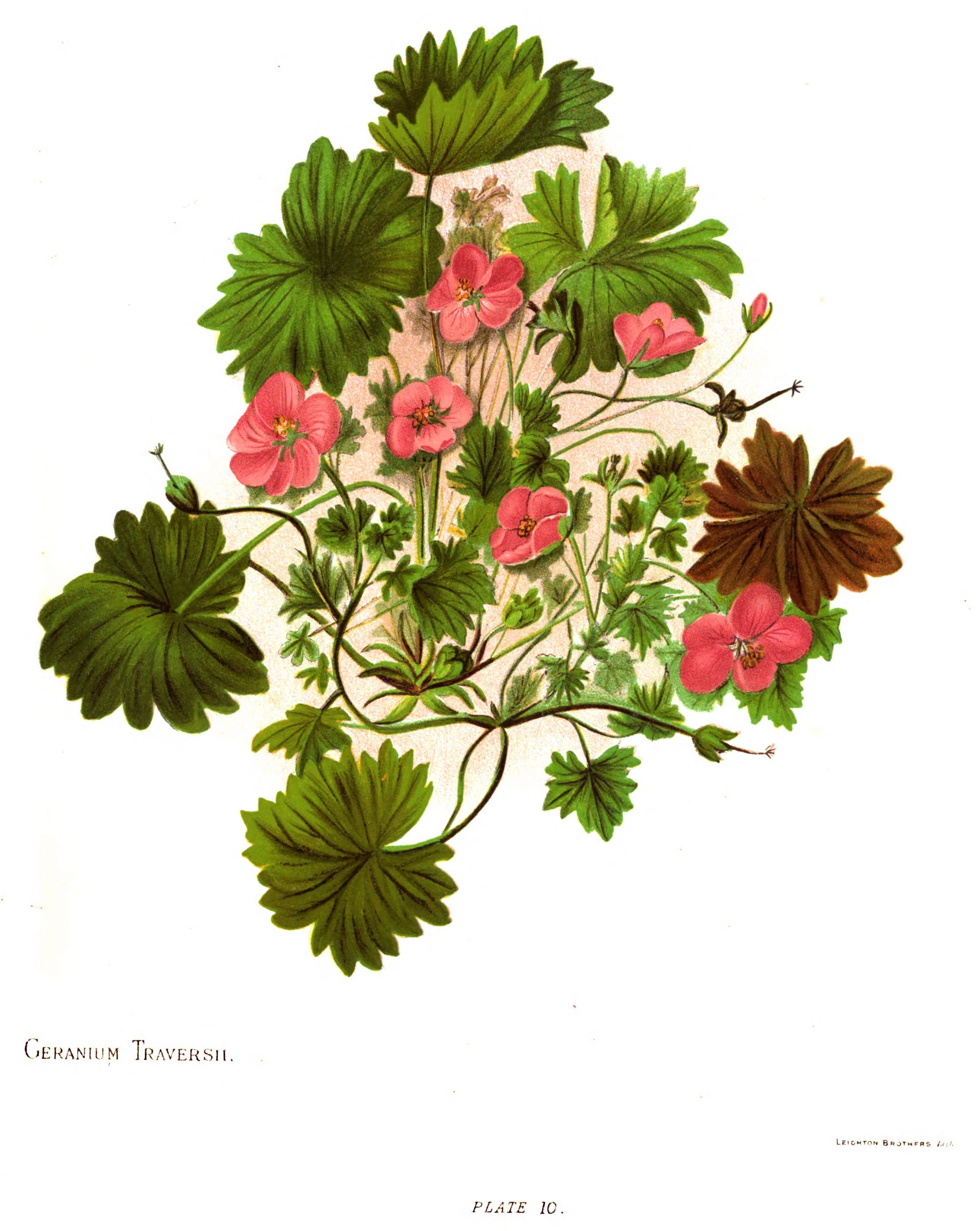
- Botanical illustration

Scientific classification
- Kingdom: Plantae
- Clade: Tracheophytes
- Clade: Angiosperms
- Clade: Eudicots
- Clade: Rosids
- Order: Geraniales
- Family: Geraniaceae
- Genus: Geranium
- Species: G. traversii

Binomial name
- Geranium traversii Hook.f.

Synonyms
- Geranium traversii var. elegans Cockayne

= Geranium traversii =

Species of plant

Geranium traversii, the Chatham Island geranium, is a species of flowering plant in the family Geraniaceae. It is native to the Chatham Islands of New Zealand. A perennial, it is found in a wide variety of habitats on its home islands, and is cultivated elsewhere.
