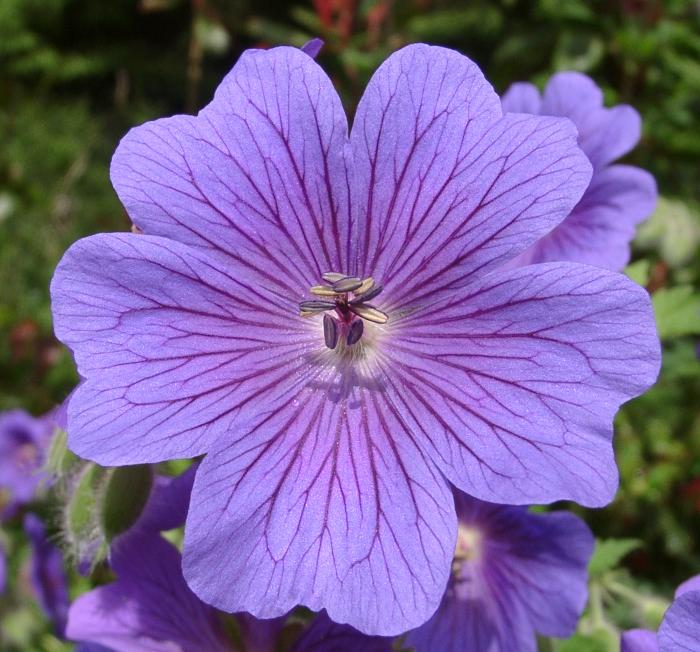

Scientific classification
- Kingdom: Plantae
- Clade: Tracheophytes
- Clade: Angiosperms
- Clade: Eudicots
- Clade: Rosids
- Order: Geraniales
- Family: Geraniaceae
- Genus: Geranium
- Species: G. × magnificum

Binomial name
- Geranium × magnificum Hyl.

= Geranium × magnificum =

Species of flowering plant

Geranium × magnificum, the purple cranesbill, is a species of hardy flowering herbaceous perennial plant in the genus Geranium, family Geraniaceae. The multiplication symbol × indicates that it is the result of hybridisation, in this case between Geranium platypetalum and Geranium ibericum. Growing into a clump 70 cm (28 in) high and broad, it has the decorative, deeply-lobed leaves typical of the genus Geranium. Violet-blue flowers with darker veins are borne relatively briefly in early summer. Extremely hardy, to below −20 °C (−4 °F), it is suitable for cultivation throughout all temperate regions. This plant has gained the Royal Horticultural Society's Award of Garden Merit.
