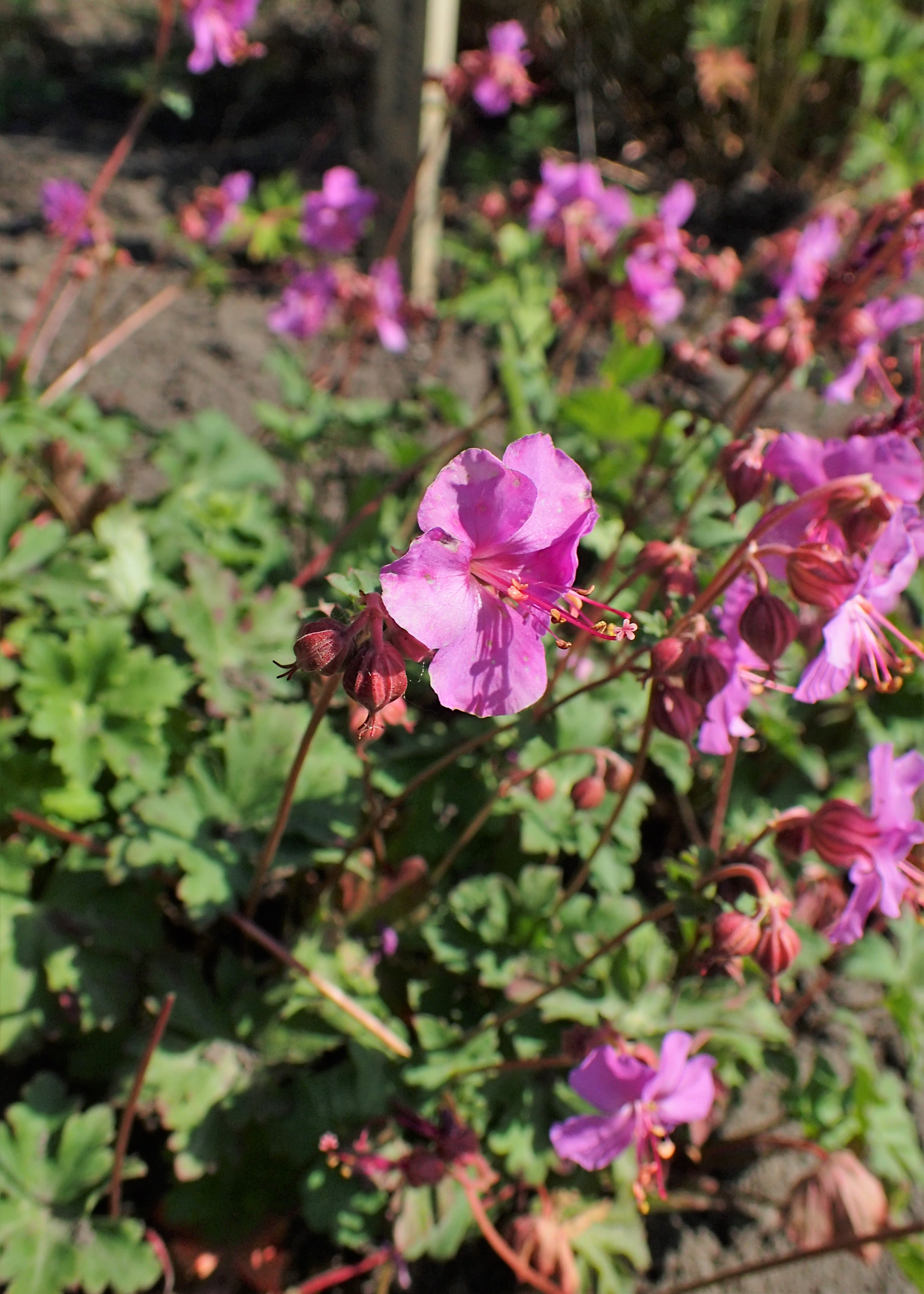
- At Vácrátót Botanical Garden
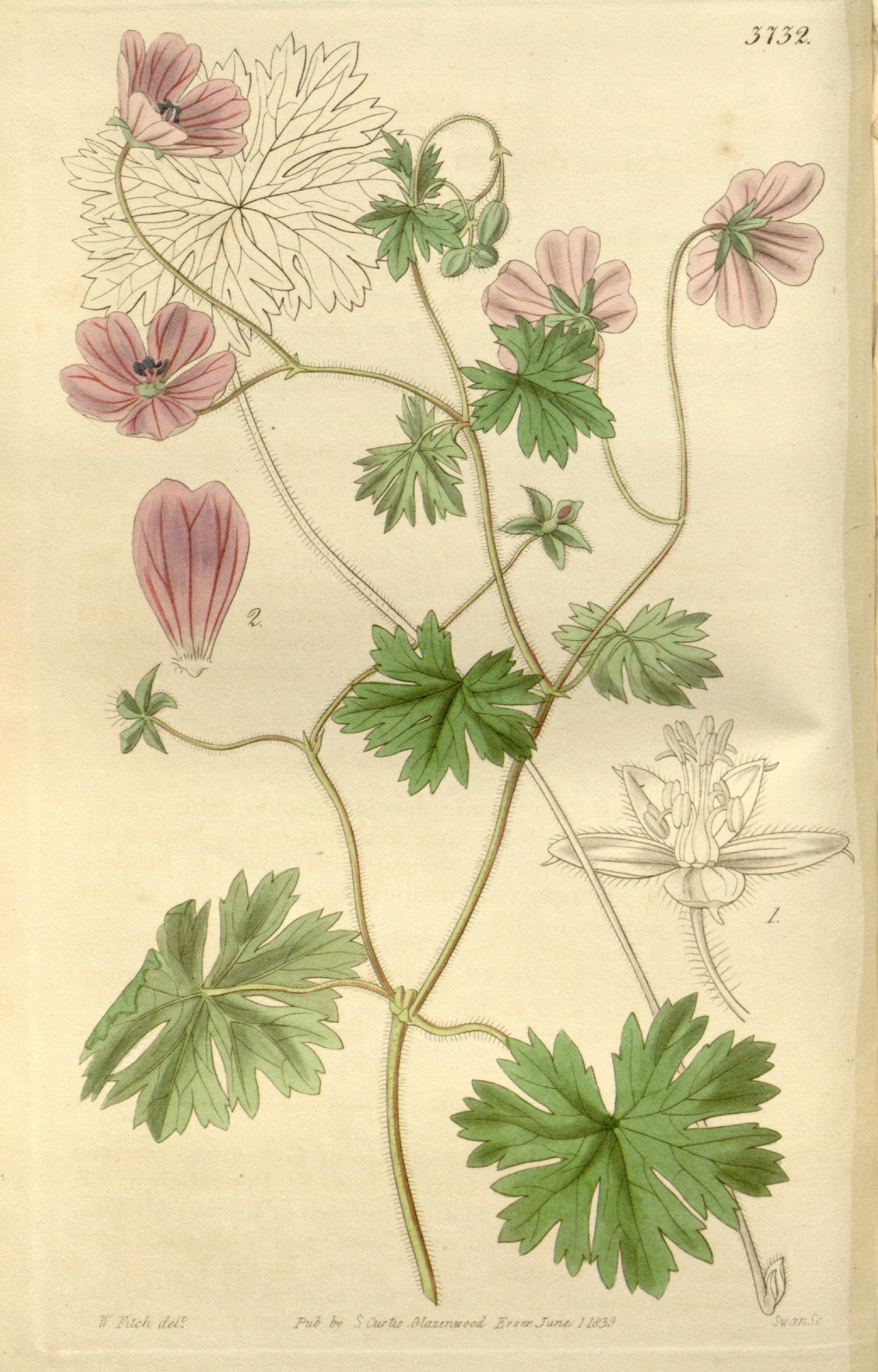
- Botanical illustration

Scientific classification
- Kingdom: Plantae
- Clade: Embryophytes
- Clade: Tracheophytes
- Clade: Angiosperms
- Clade: Eudicots
- Clade: Rosids
- Order: Geraniales
- Family: Geraniaceae
- Genus: Geranium
- Species: G. albanum

Binomial name
- Geranium albanum M.Bieb.

Synonyms
- Geranium cristatum Steven

= Geranium albanum =

Species of flowering plant

Geranium albanum, the crested cranesbill or Albanian cranesbill, (Note: Presumably the epithet and common name refer to Caucasian Albania) is a species of flowering plant in the family Geraniaceae, native to the Caucasus and northern Iran. A clumping perennial reaching 50 cm (20 in), the Royal Horticultural Society considers it a good plant to attract pollinators. There is a cultivar, 'Pink and Stripes'.
