= List of botanical gardens in Hungary =

This is a complete list of botanical gardens in Hungary.

- Alcsútdoboz arboretum
- Bábolna arboretum
- Badacsonytomaj, Folly arboretum
- Balatongyörök, Büdöskút arboretum
- Bárdudvarnok, Kaposdada arboretum
- Buda arboretum
- Budakeszi arboretum
- Budapest Budapest Zoo & Botanical Garden
- Budapest Füvészkert
- Budapest, Soroksár arboretum
- Balaton, Szent György-hegy Balatoni Mediterrán Botanikus Kert
- Cserszegtomaj arboretum
- Csurgónagymarton, Ágneslak Arboretum
- Debrecen, Diószegi Sámuel Botanical Garden
- Erdőtelek arboretum
- Gödöllő arboretum
- Hosszúhetény, Püspökszentlászló: arboretum of the episcopal castle
- Kám, Jel Arboretum (the largest in Hungary, 74 hectares)
- Kiscsehi, Budafapuszta arboretum
- Kőszeg, Chernel-kert Arboretum
- Lábatlan-Piszke, Gerenday arboretum
- Orosháza, Rágyánszki Arboretum
- Pákozd, Pákozd-sukoró Arboretum
- Pannonhalma arboretum
- Püspökladány arboretum
- Sárvár arboretum
- Sopron Egyetemi Botanikus Kert / Élő növénygyűjtemény
- Szarvas, Pepi-kert arboretum
- Szeleste arboretum
- Szombathely, Kámon Arboretum
- Tata-Agostyán arboretum
- Tiszaigar arboretum
- Tiszakürt arboretum
- Tiszalök arboretum
- Vácrátót Botanical Garden
- Zalaegerszeg, Csács Arboretum
- Zirc arboretum

== See also ==
- List of botanical gardens
- Debrecen, Diószegi Sámuel Botanical Garden
