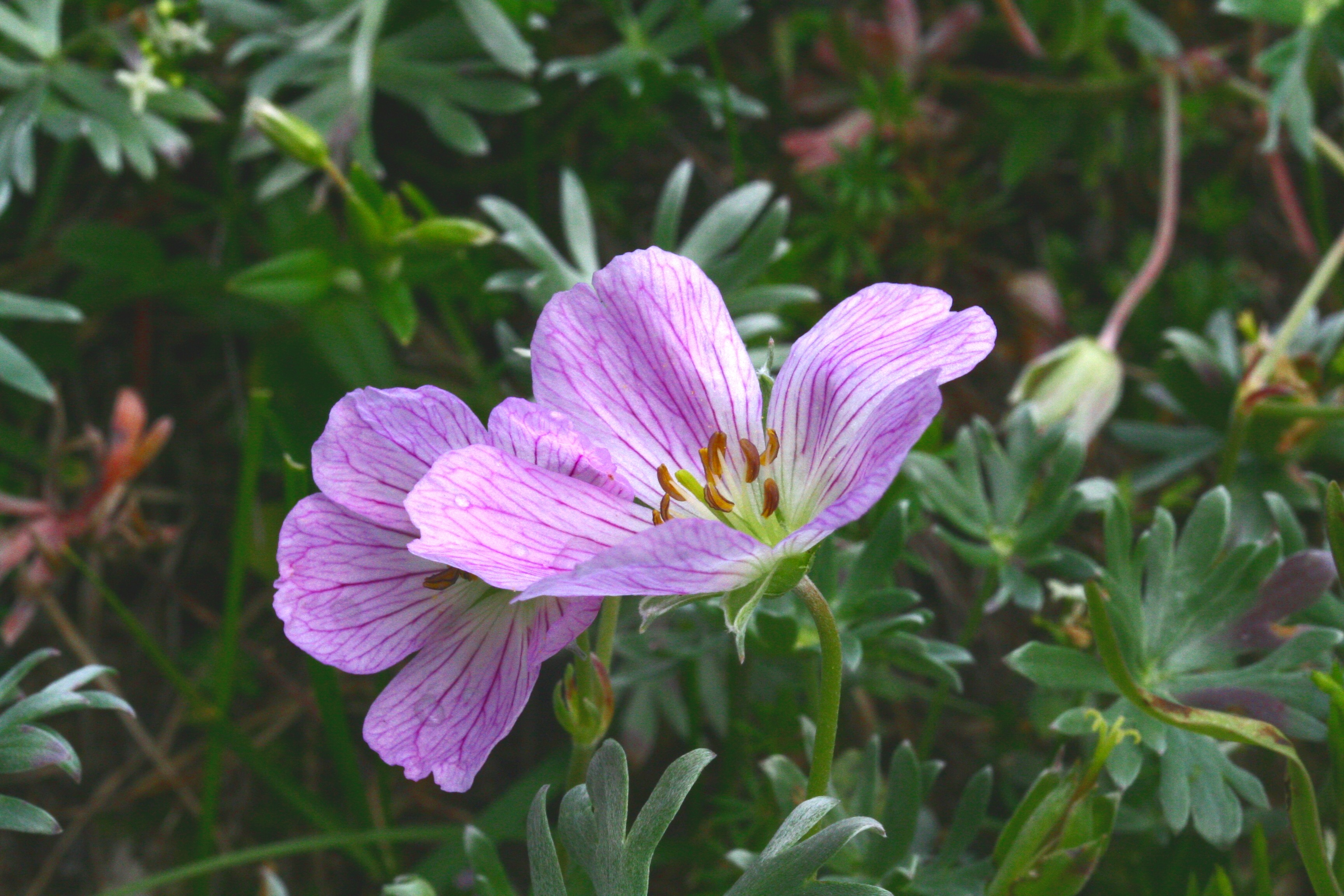

Scientific classification
- Kingdom: Plantae
- Clade: Tracheophytes
- Clade: Angiosperms
- Clade: Eudicots
- Clade: Rosids
- Order: Geraniales
- Family: Geraniaceae
- Genus: Geranium
- Species: G. argenteum

Binomial name
- Geranium argenteum L.

= Geranium argenteum =

Species of flowering plant

Geranium argenteum, the silvery crane's bill, is an ornamental plant in the family Geraniaceae, which is native to Europe.
