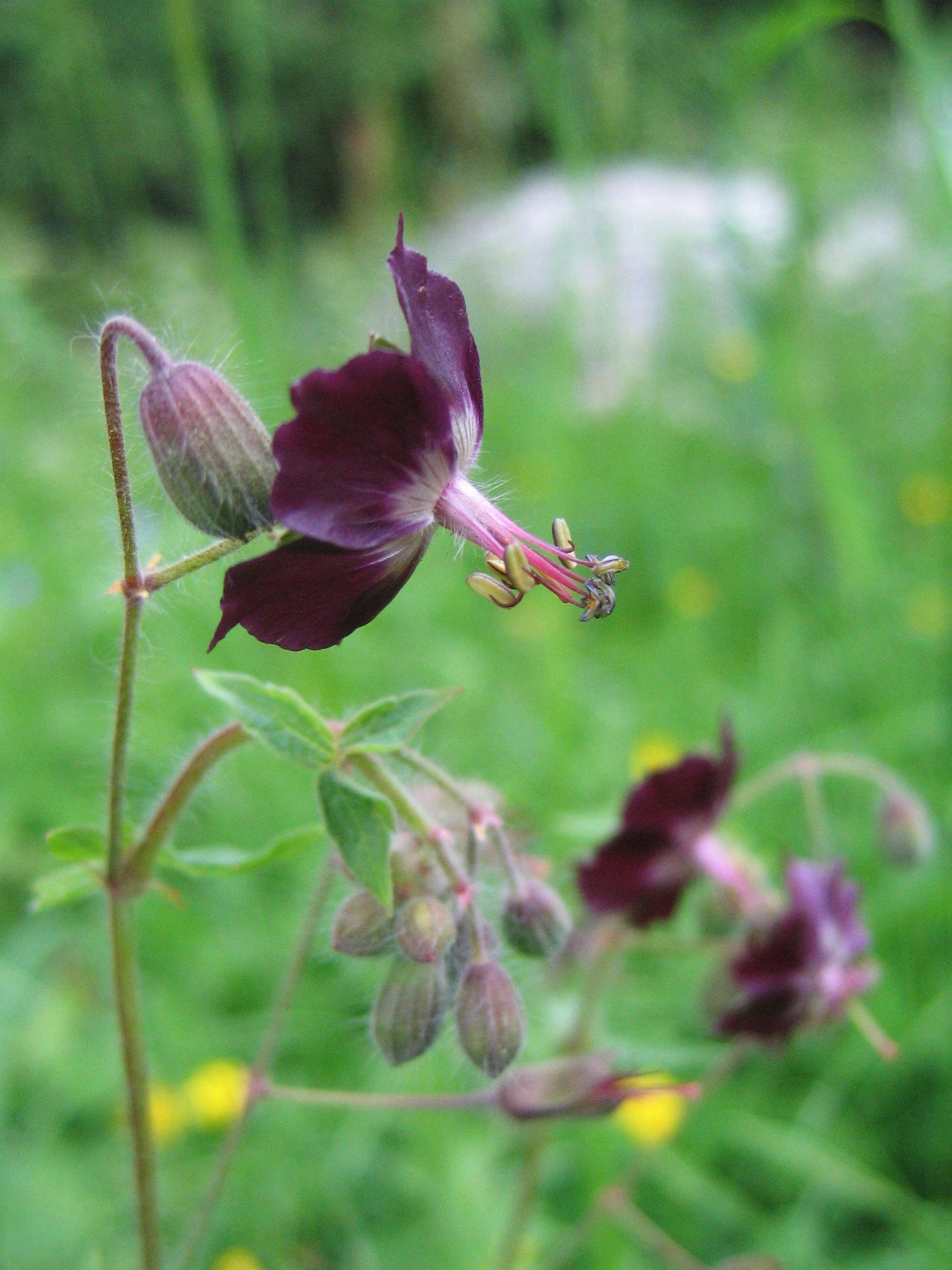

Scientific classification
- Kingdom: Plantae
- Clade: Tracheophytes
- Clade: Angiosperms
- Clade: Eudicots
- Clade: Rosids
- Order: Geraniales
- Family: Geraniaceae
- Genus: Geranium
- Species: G. phaeum

Binomial name
- Geranium phaeum L.

= Geranium phaeum =

Species of flowering plant

Geranium phaeum, commonly called dusky crane's-bill, mourning widow or black widow, is a herbaceous plant species in the family Geraniaceae. It is native to southern, central, and western Europe, and is cultivated as a garden subject. It has dark violet colored flowers. It is unmistakable with dark purple petals turned backwards and with conspicuous projecting stamens and style. Petals crinkly-edged and pointed. Leaves often blotched brown.

The cultivar 'Our Pat' has gained the Royal Horticultural Society's Award of Garden Merit.
