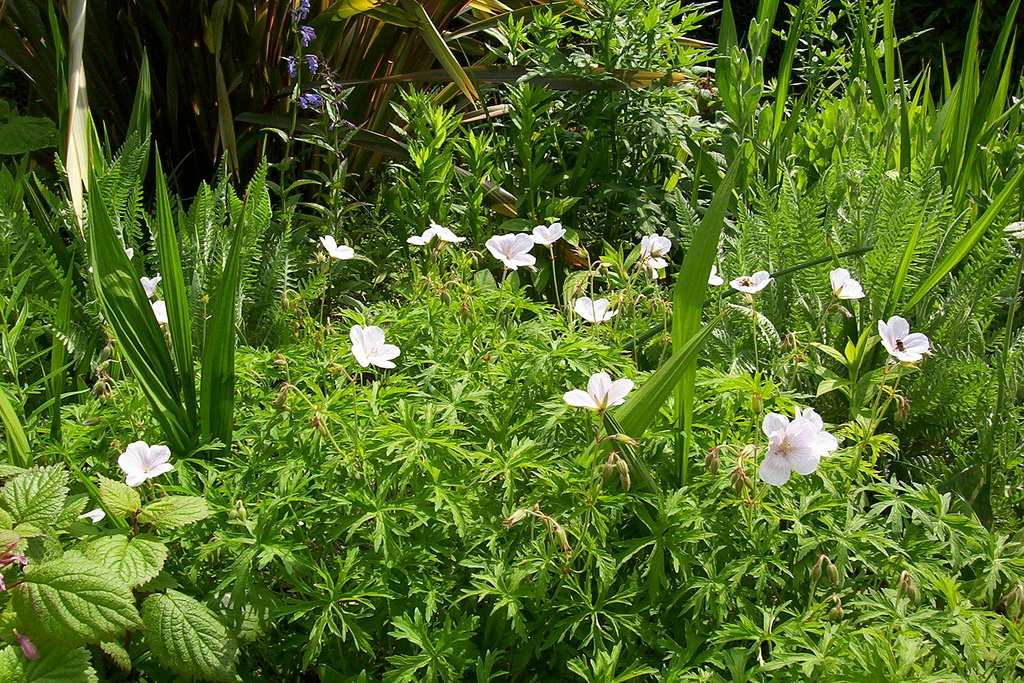
- Geranium clarkei 'Kashmir White'

Scientific classification
- Kingdom: Plantae
- Clade: Tracheophytes
- Clade: Angiosperms
- Clade: Eudicots
- Clade: Rosids
- Order: Geraniales
- Family: Geraniaceae
- Genus: Geranium
- Species: G. clarkei

Binomial name
- Geranium clarkei P.F.Yeo

= Geranium clarkei =

Species of flowering plant

Geranium clarkei, called Clarke's geranium, is a species of perennial flowering plant in the family Geraniaceae, native to India and cultivated for use in gardens.

== Description ==
It is an herbaceous perennial growing to 50 cm (20 in) in height, with deeply cut 7-lobed leaves and white or purple flowers with pink veining in summer. It spreads by underground rhizomes, and is used for groundcover or the front of a border.

== Habitat ==
It occurs in Kashmir at altitudes of 2100-4200 m above the sea level.
