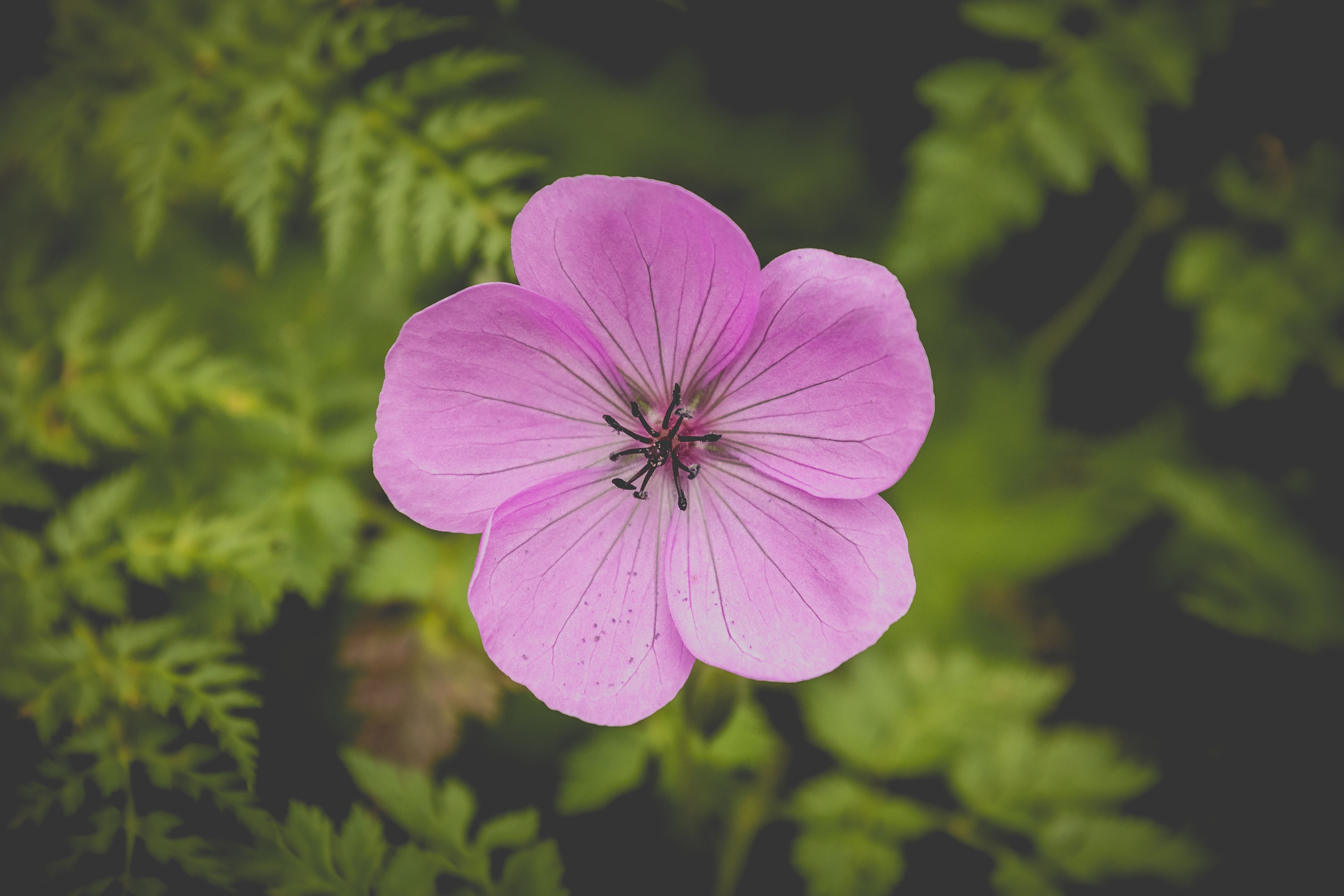

Scientific classification
- Kingdom: Plantae
- Clade: Tracheophytes
- Clade: Angiosperms
- Clade: Eudicots
- Clade: Rosids
- Order: Geraniales
- Family: Geraniaceae
- Genus: Geranium
- Species: G. cinereum

Binomial name
- Geranium cinereum Cav., 1787

= Geranium cinereum =

Species of flowering plant

Geranium cinereum, the ashy cranesbill, is a species of flowering plant in the family Geraniaceae, native to the Pyrenees. Growing to 50 cm (20 in) tall and wide, it is a small, deciduous or semi-evergreen perennial usually grown for low ground cover, rockeries or underplanting larger subjects like roses. Leaves are deeply divided and grey-green – whence the Latin specific epithet cinereum "ash-grey". It flowers in summer, with striking black-eyed flowers with black stamens. The plant grows in full sunlight, and is hardy down to −15 °C (5 °F).

In cultivation in the UK the following cultivars in the Cinereum Group have been given a Royal Horticultural Society Award of Garden Merit:-

- 'Ballerina'
- Blue Sunrise = 'Blogold'
- 'Giuseppe'
- Rothbury Gem = ‘Gerfos’
