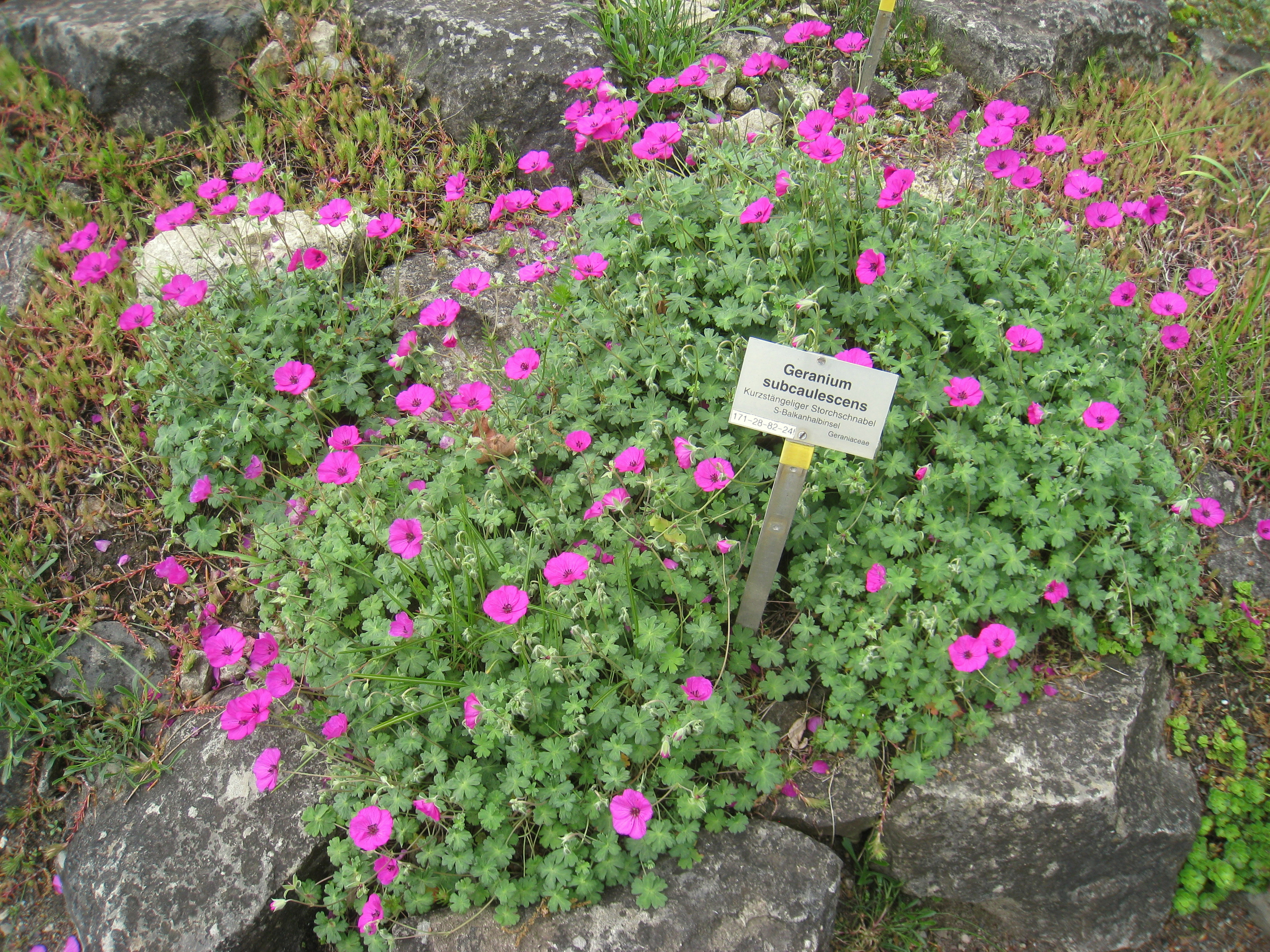

Scientific classification
- Kingdom: Plantae
- Clade: Tracheophytes
- Clade: Angiosperms
- Clade: Eudicots
- Clade: Rosids
- Order: Geraniales
- Family: Geraniaceae
- Genus: Geranium
- Species: G. subcaulescens

Binomial name
- Geranium subcaulescens L'Hér. ex DC.

= Geranium subcaulescens =

Species of flowering plant

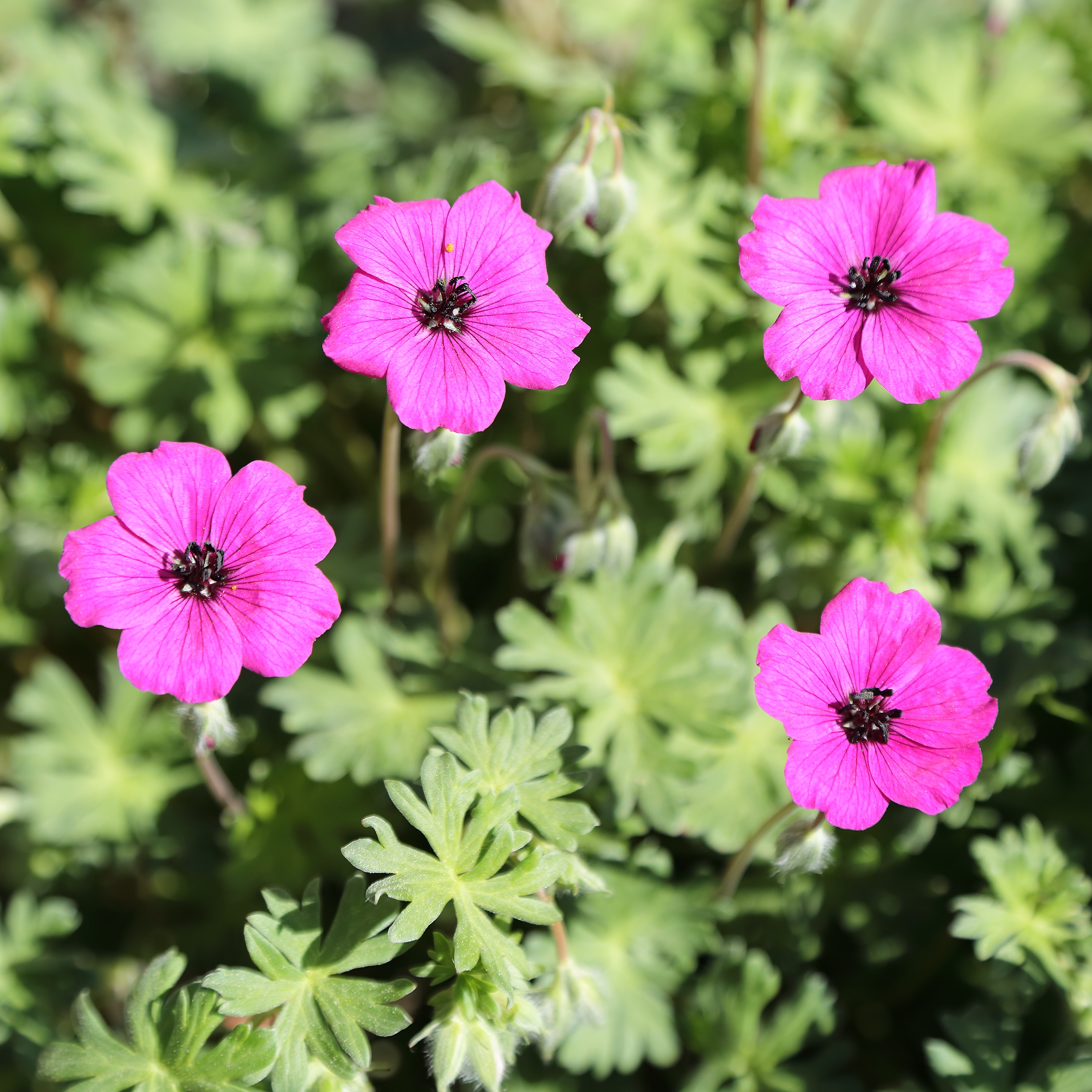

Geranium subcaulescens (grey cranesbill) is a species of flowering plant in the geranium family Geraniaceae, that is native to Italy, Turkey and the Balkans. A low, mounded evergreen perennial, it typically grows to 8 in (20 cm) tall by more than 11 in (28 cm) broad, with grey-green orbicular and lobed leaves, and masses of bright magenta pink flowers with black centres in summer.

It requires sharp drainage, so is suitable for cultivation in a rock garden, or as an under-planting groundcover with larger plants such as roses. Numerous cultivars have been selected. The species G. subcaulescens, and the cultivars 'Giuseppii' and 'Splendens' have gained the Royal Horticultural Society's Award of Garden Merit.

The Latin specific epithet subcaulescens means "with a small stem".

== Synonyms ==
- Geranium cinereum var. rupestris
- Geranium cinereum var. subcaulescens
- Geranium cinereum forma genuinum
- Geranium cinereum subsp. subcaulescens
- Geranium cinereum var. macedonicum
- Geranium humbertii
