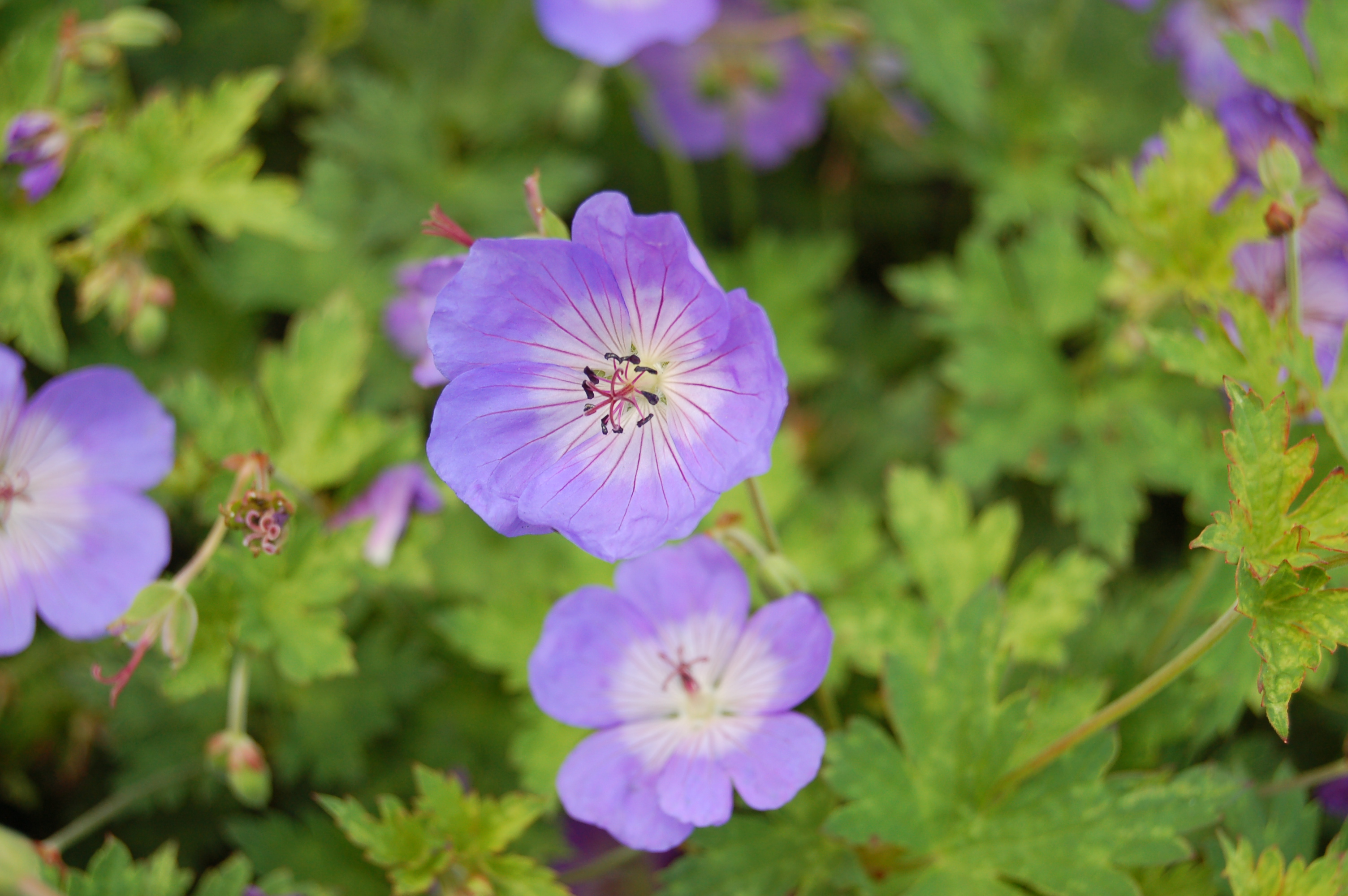

Scientific classification
- Kingdom: Plantae
- Clade: Tracheophytes
- Clade: Angiosperms
- Clade: Eudicots
- Clade: Rosids
- Order: Geraniales
- Family: Geraniaceae
- Genus: Geranium
- Species: G. wallichianum

Binomial name
- Geranium wallichianum Oliv.

= Geranium wallichianum =

Species of flowering plant

Geranium wallichianum is a species of hardy flowering herbaceous perennial plant in the genus Geranium, family Geraniaceae. It is native to the Himalayas. It grows to 60 cm (24 in) tall and broad, with hairy toothed leaves and masses of bright blue flowers in summer. It is suitable for cultivation in temperate climates, in the front of the border.

The specific epithet wallichianum honours the Danish plant hunter Dr Nathaniel Wallich (1786-1854).

Various cultivars have been selected, including Rozanne='Gerwat', which has gained the Royal Horticultural Society's Award of Garden Merit. It is larger and more floriferous than the species.

== Gallery ==
G. 'Rozanne' in the Arnold Arboretum of Harvard University, 2026
