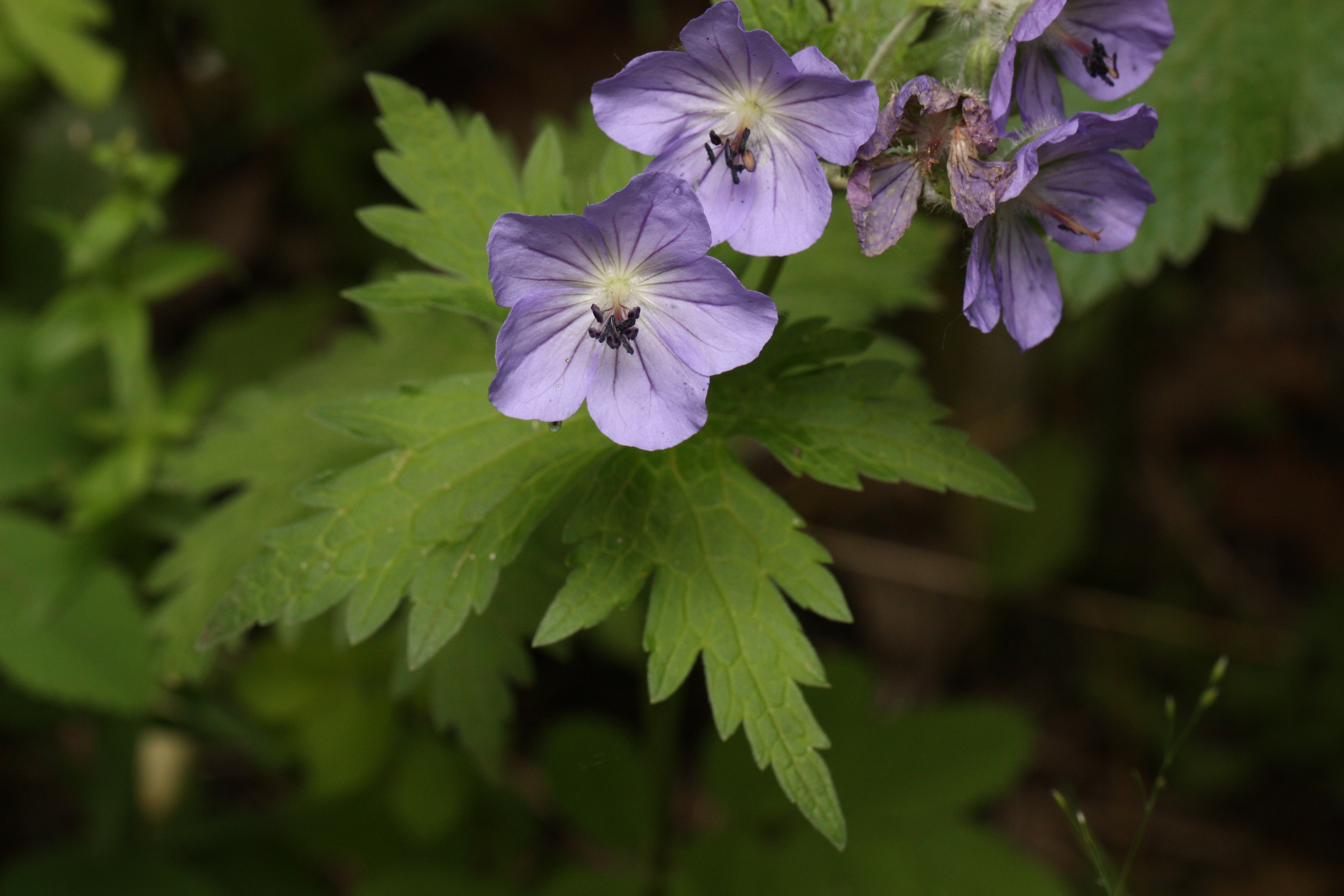

Scientific classification
- Kingdom: Plantae
- Clade: Tracheophytes
- Clade: Angiosperms
- Clade: Eudicots
- Clade: Rosids
- Order: Geraniales
- Family: Geraniaceae
- Genus: Geranium
- Species: G. erianthum

Binomial name
- Geranium erianthum DC.

= Geranium erianthum =

Species of flowering plant

Geranium erianthum, the woolly geranium, is a flowering plant found in China, Japan, Russia, North America and England. Within its range, it is often known as "wild geranium" or "cranesbill", but note that these common names are also used for several other species within the genus Geranium.
