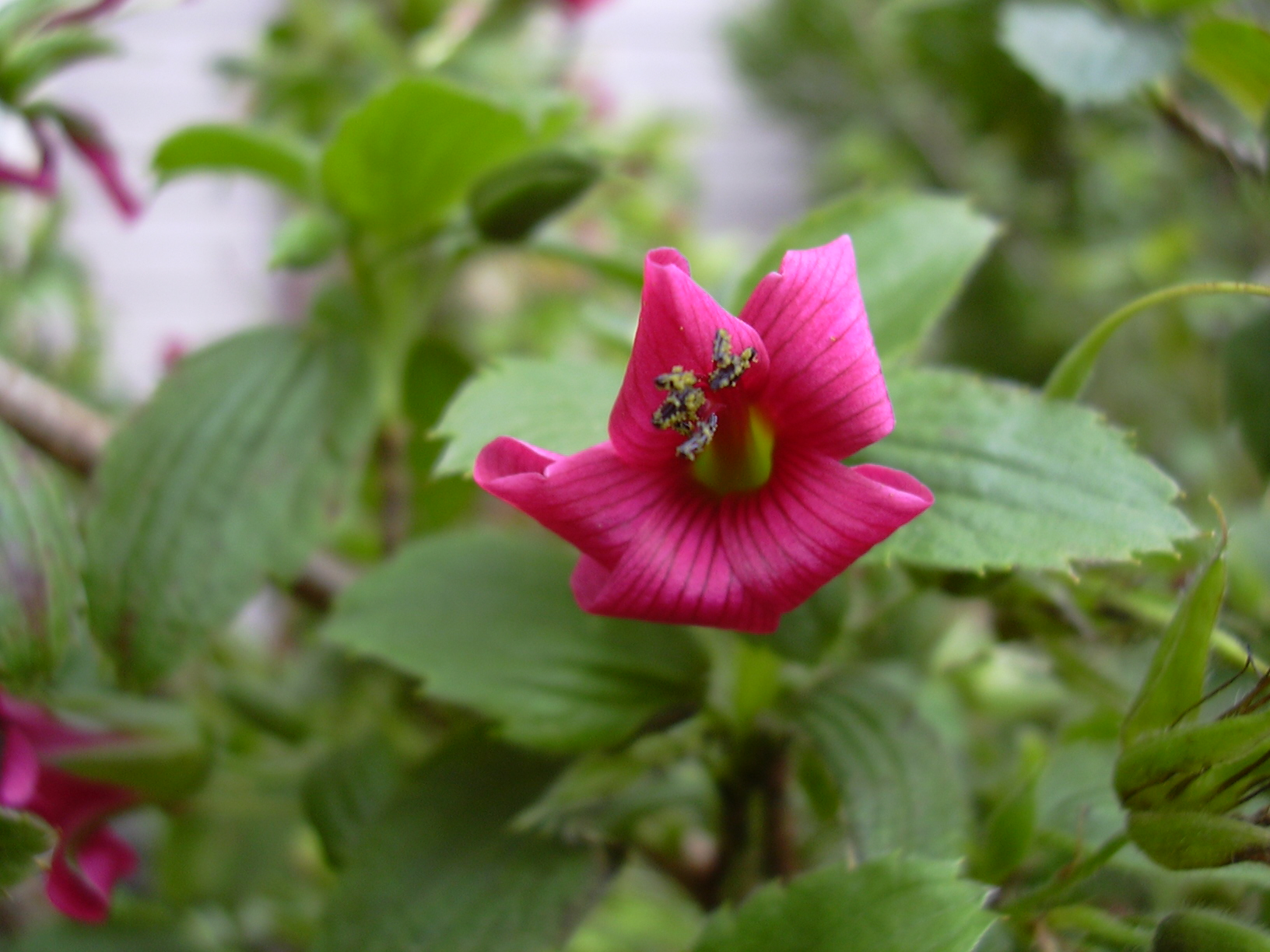

Conservation status
- Critically Imperiled (NatureServe)

Scientific classification
- Kingdom: Plantae
- Clade: Tracheophytes
- Clade: Angiosperms
- Clade: Eudicots
- Clade: Rosids
- Order: Geraniales
- Family: Geraniaceae
- Genus: Geranium
- Species: G. arboreum

Binomial name
- Geranium arboreum A.Gray

= Geranium arboreum =

Species of flowering plant

Geranium arboreum is a rare species of geranium known by the common names Hawaiian red-flowered geranium and Hawaii red cranesbill. It is endemic to Hawaii, where it is known only from the island of Maui. It was federally listed as an endangered species in 1992. Like other Hawaiian geraniums, this plant is known as hinahina and nohoanu.

This plant is a shrub which can reach 4 meters in height. The leaves have green, toothed blades up to 3.8 centimeters long. The flowers are red or magenta. The upper petals are erect, but the lower two are curved under. The shape of the flower indicates it is pollinated by birds, which is unique among the geraniums.

This plant grows in gulches on the slopes of the volcano Haleakalā. There are no more than 500 individuals left.

The main threat to this species is the degradation of its habitat by grazing cattle, feral pigs, and non-native plant species invading the area.
