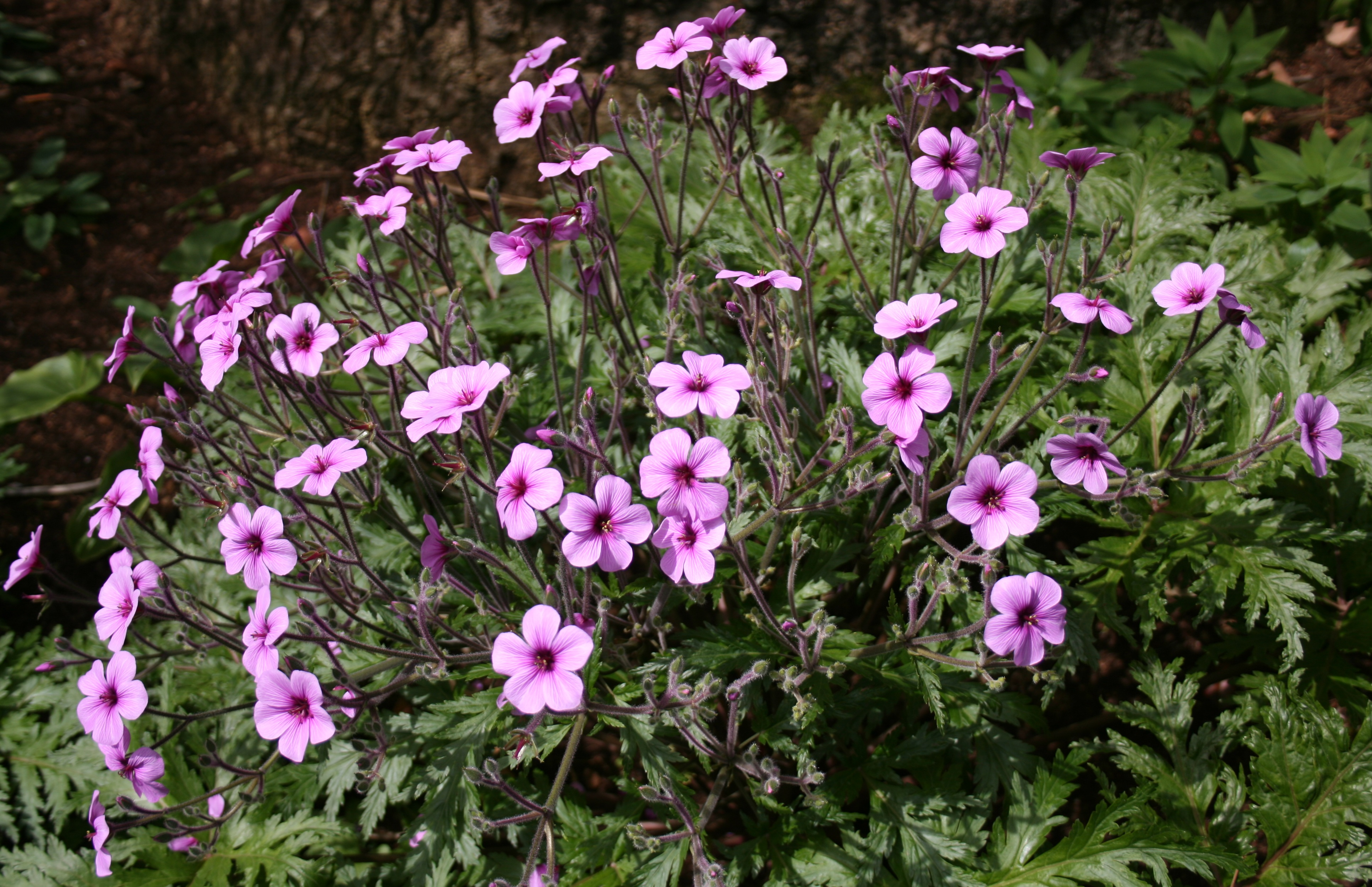

Conservation status
- Critically Endangered (IUCN 3.1)

Scientific classification
- Kingdom: Plantae
- Clade: Tracheophytes
- Clade: Angiosperms
- Clade: Eudicots
- Clade: Rosids
- Order: Geraniales
- Family: Geraniaceae
- Genus: Geranium
- Species: G. maderense

Binomial name
- Geranium maderense Yeo

= Geranium maderense =

Species of flowering plant

Geranium maderense, known as giant herb-Robert or the Madeira cranesbill, is a species of flowering plant in the family Geraniaceae, native to the island of Madeira. It is sometimes confused with another Madeira endemic, Geranium palmatum.

Growing to 120–150 cm (47–59 in) tall and wide, it is a mound-forming evergreen biennial or triennial with deeply divided ferny leaves. Spectacular pink flowers on hairy red stems are produced in large panicles in summer. It is grown as an ornamental plant in temperate regions, where it is hardy in mild or coastal areas down to −5 °C (23 °F). It has gained the Royal Horticultural Society's Award of Garden Merit.
