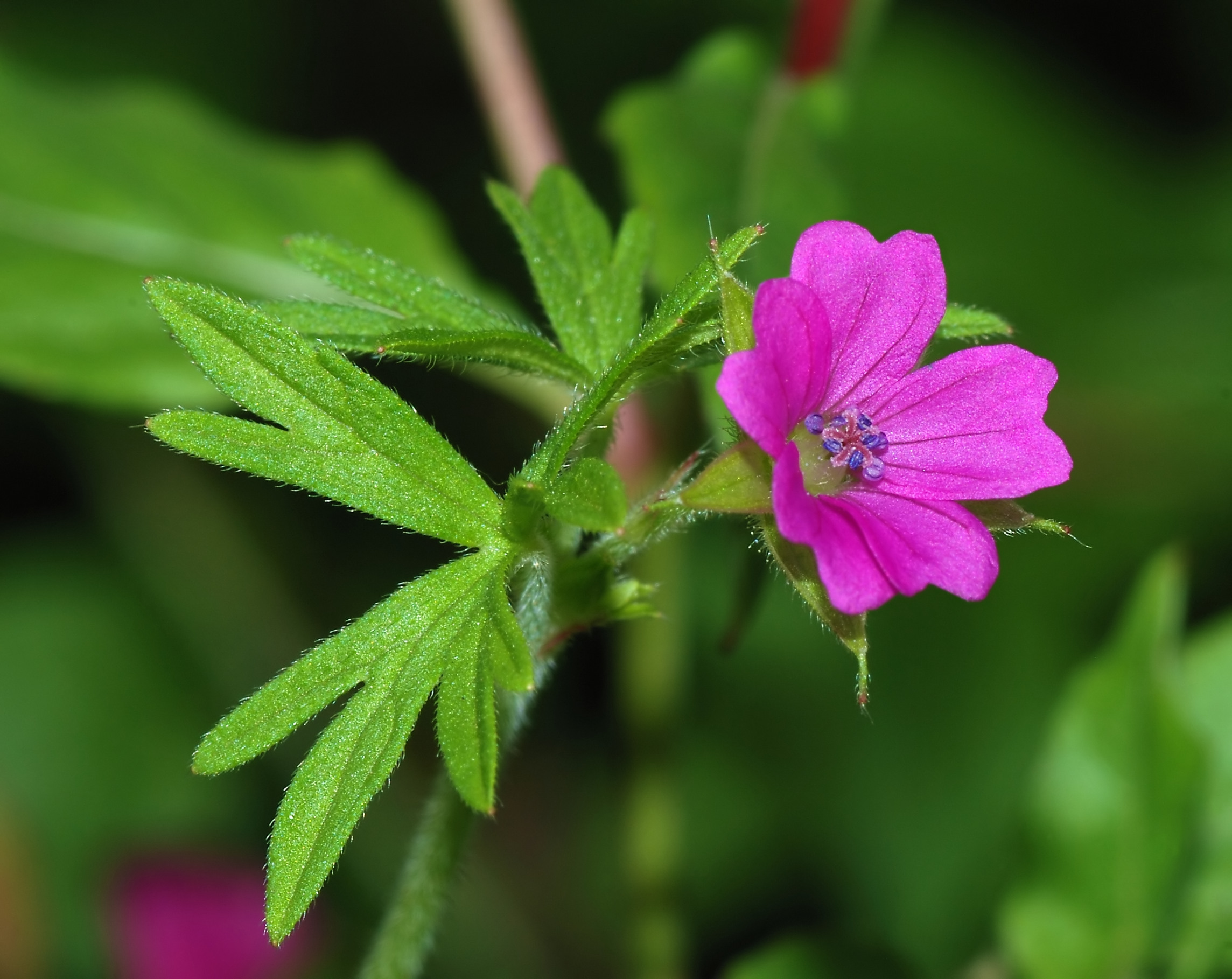
- Geranium dissectum, Cut-leaved Crane's-bill

Scientific classification
- Kingdom: Plantae
- Clade: Tracheophytes
- Clade: Angiosperms
- Clade: Eudicots
- Clade: Rosids
- Order: Geraniales
- Family: Geraniaceae
- Genus: Geranium; L.

Species
- See list.

= Geranium =

Genus of flowering plants

Geranium is a genus of 422 species of annual, biennial, and perennial plants that are commonly known as geraniums, hardy geraniums, or cranesbills. They are found throughout the temperate regions of the world and the mountains of the tropics, with the greatest diversity in the eastern part of the Mediterranean region.

The palmately cleft leaves are broadly circular in form. The flowers have five petals and are coloured white, pink, purple, or blue, often with distinctive veining. Geraniums will grow in any soil as long as it is not waterlogged. Propagation is by semiripe cuttings in summer, by seed, or by division in autumn or spring.

Geraniums are eaten by the larvae of some Lepidoptera species including brown-tail, ghost moth, and mouse moth. At least several species of Geranium are gynodioecious. The species Geranium viscosissimum (sticky geranium) is considered to be protocarnivorous.

== Name ==
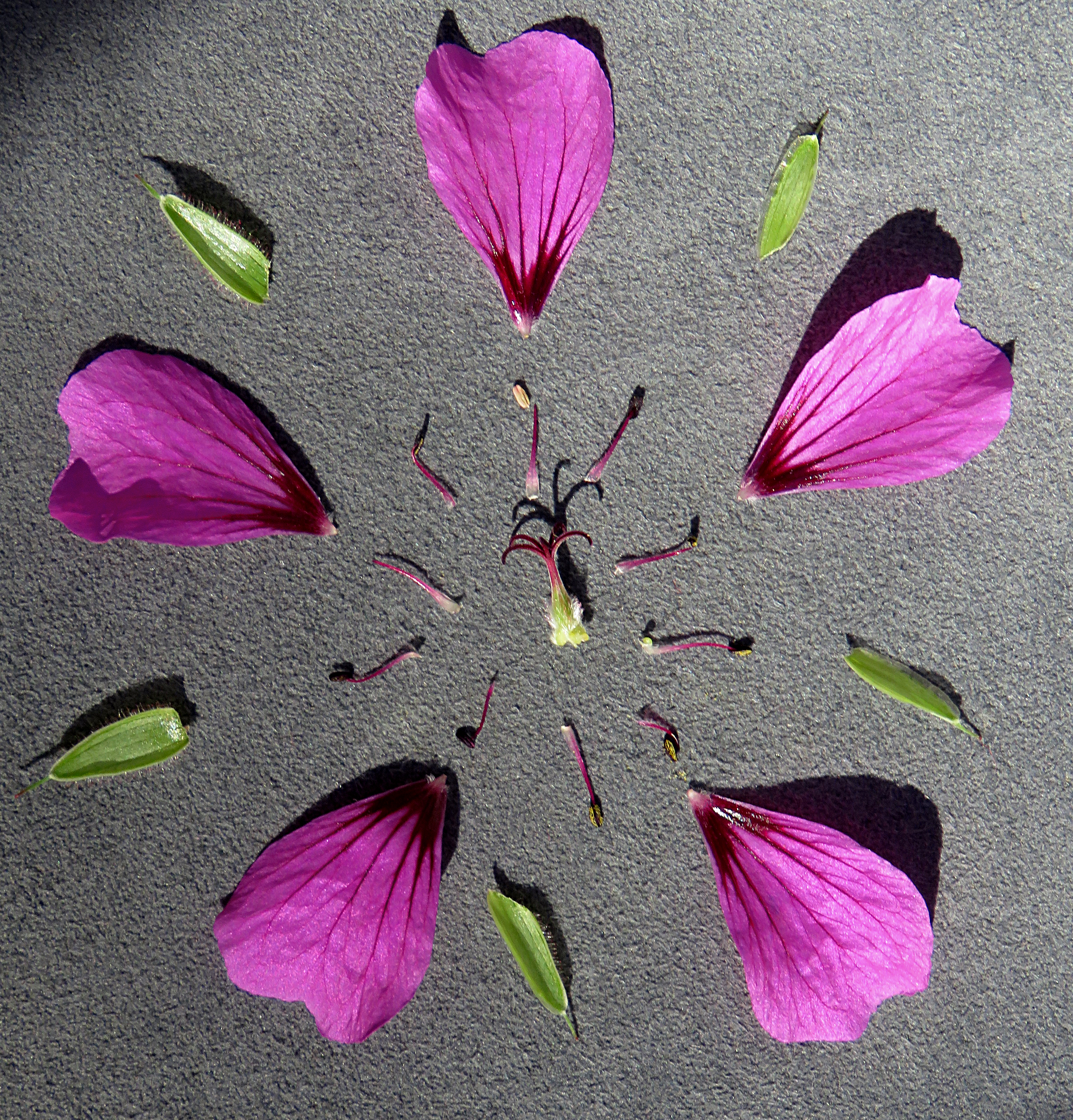
Floral diagram of a Geranium garden hybrid called ‘Ann Thomson’, showing 5 free sepals, 5 free petals, 10 free fertile stamens, and a superior ovary consisting of 5 merged carpels, with 5 style branches

The genus name is derived from Ancient Greek γέρανος (géranos) 'crane'. The English name 'cranesbill' derives from the resemblance of the fruit capsule of some of the species to a crane's head and bill. The ovary portion forms the head and the prolonged stigma creates the appearance of a beak.

== Description ==
The flowers are typically five-petaled and white to purple. The leaves are palmate divided into narrow, pointed segments.

The fruit capsule consists of five cells joined to a column produced from the centre of the flower. The cells form lobes which eventually separate, each containing one seed. When the fruit is ripe, the beak-like stigma springs open and casts the ovoid, streamlined seeds some distance, dispersing the seeds.

== Confusion with Pelargonium ==
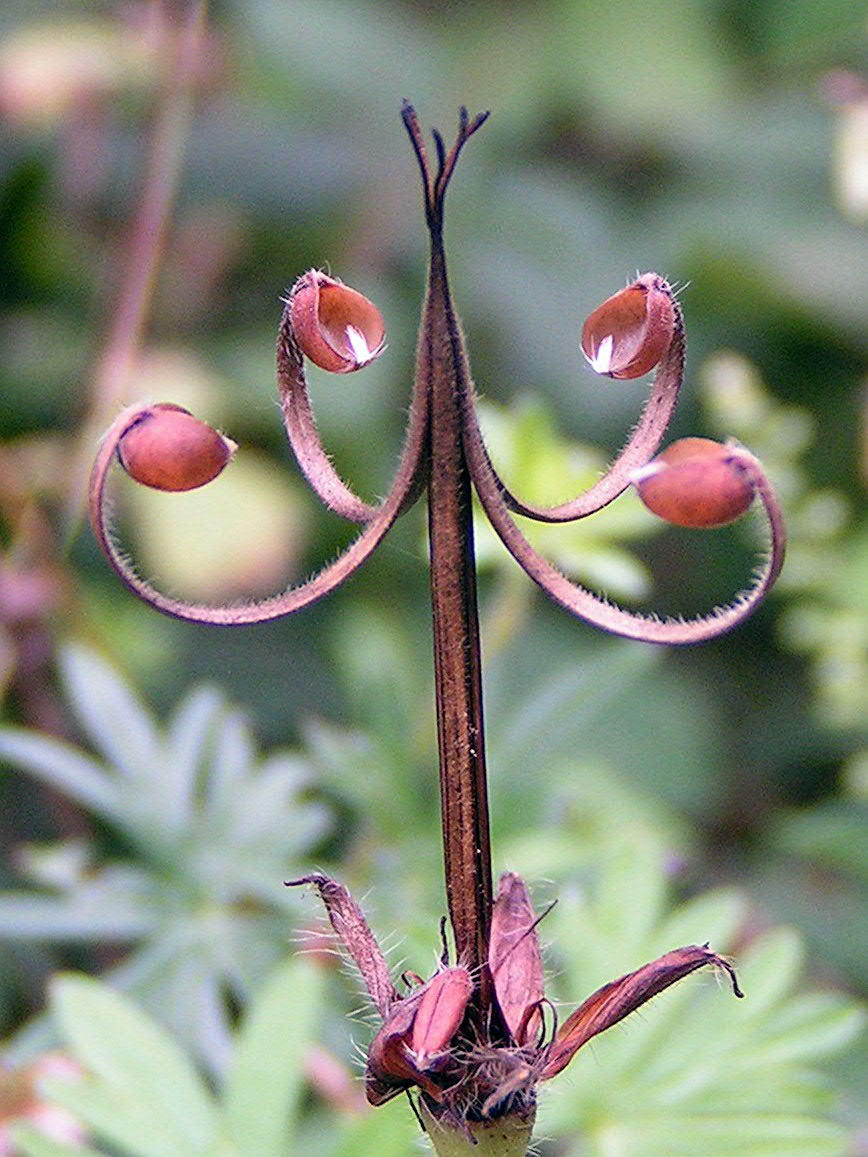
The "bill" and seed dispersal mechanism of G. pratense

Confusingly, "geranium" is also the common name of members of the genus Pelargonium, which are also in the family Geraniaceae and are widely grown as horticultural bedding plants. Linnaeus originally included all the species in one genus, Geranium, but they were later separated into two genera by Charles L’Héritier in 1789. Other former members of the genus are now classified in Erodium, including the plants known as filarees in North America.

The term "hardy geranium" is often applied to horticultural Geraniums to distinguish them from the Pelargoniums, which are not winter-hardy in temperate horticulture. However, not all Geranium species are winter-hardy (see below).

The shape of the flowers offers one way of distinguishing between the two genera Geranium and Pelargonium. Geranium flowers have five very similar petals, and are thus radially symmetrical (actinomorphic), whereas Pelargonium (and also Erodium) flowers have two upper petals which are different from the three lower petals, so the flowers have a single plane of symmetry (zygomorphic).

== Cultivation ==
A number of geranium species are cultivated for horticultural use and for pharmaceutical products. Some of the more commonly grown species include:

- Geranium albanum (crested cranesbill)
- Geranium cinereum
- Geranium clarkei (Clarke's geranium)
- Geranium dalmaticum
- Geranium endressii (Endres's cranesbill)
- Geranium erianthum (woolly geranium)
- Geranium fremontii (Fremont's geranium)
- Geranium himalayense, often sold under Geranium grandiflorum
- Geranium ibericum (Caucasus geranium),
- Geranium macrorrhizum (bigroot cranesbill or bigroot geranium)
- Geranium maculatum (wild geranium)
- Geranium maderense (giant herb robert)
- Geranium × magnificum (showy geranium)
- Geranium phaeum (dusky cranesbill)
- Geranium platypetalum (broad-petaled geranium)
- Geranium pratense (meadow cranesbill)
- Geranium psilostemon (Armenian cranesbill)
- Geranium renardii (Renard geranium)
- Geranium sanguineum (bloody cranesbill)
- Geranium subcaulescens (grey cranesbill)
- Geranium sylvaticum (wood cranesbill)

All the above species are perennials and generally winter-hardy plants, grown for their attractive flowers and foliage. They are long-lived and most have a mounding habit, with palmately lobed foliage. Some species have spreading rhizomes. They are normally grown in part shade to full sun, in well-draining but moisture retentive soils, rich in humus. Other perennial species grown for their flowers and foliage include: Geranium argenteum, G. eriostemon, G. farreri, G. nodosum, G. procurrens, G. pylzowianum, G. renardii, G. traversii, G. tuberosum, G. versicolor, G. wallichianum, and G. wlassovianum. Some of these are not winter-hardy in cold areas and are grown in specialized gardens like rock gardens. Geranium 'Johnson's Blue' is a hybrid between G. himalayense (southwestern China), with G. pratense (European meadow cranesbill).

=== Cultivars ===
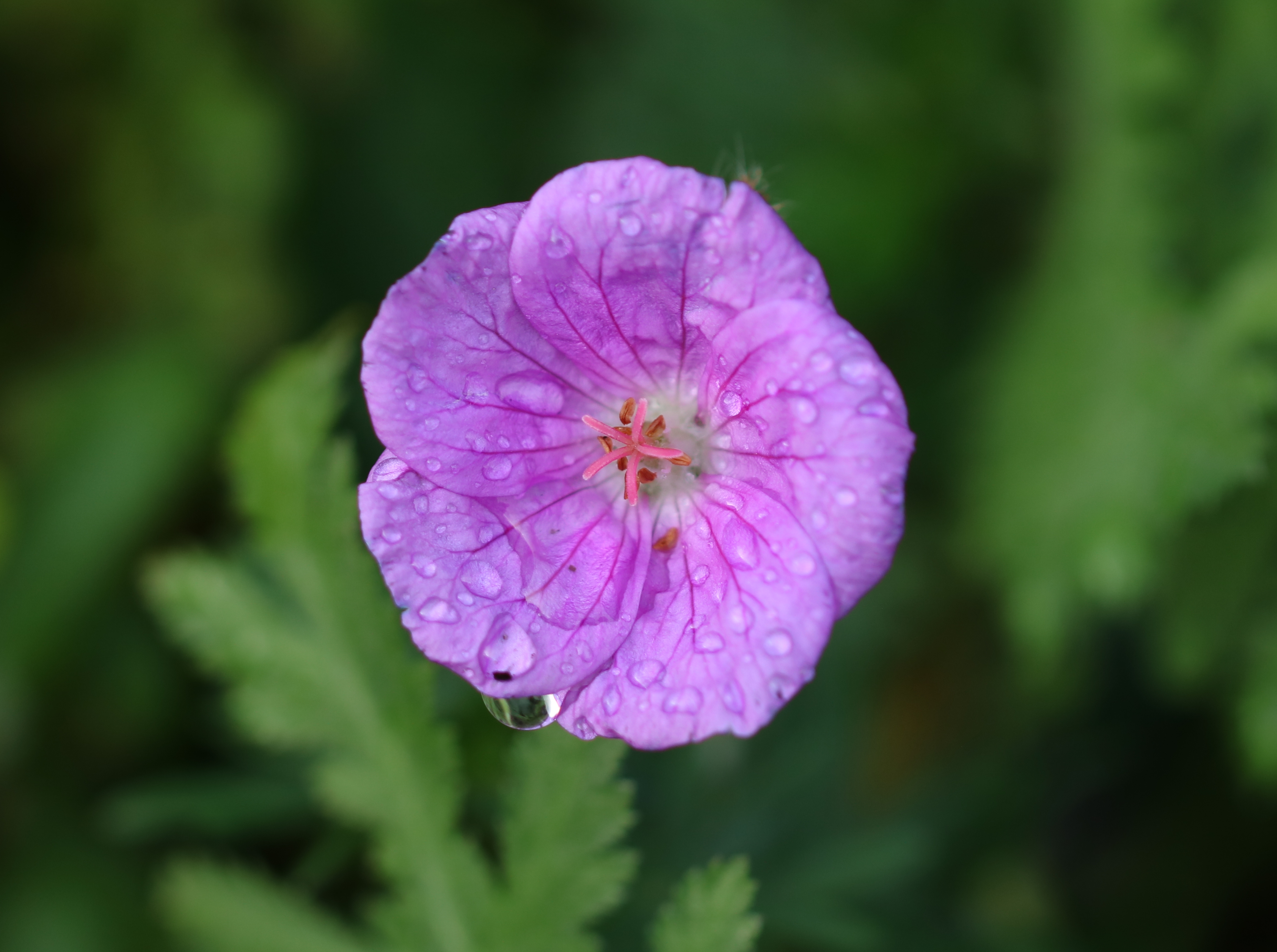
Close up of a wet geranium cultivar (probably 'Johnson's Blue')

The following hybrid cultivars have gained the Royal Horticultural Society's Award of Garden Merit (other cultivars are dealt with under their species name - see above):-

- 'Ann Folkard'
- 'A. T. Johnson' (G. × oxonianum)
- 'Ballerina'
- 'Blue Cloud'
- Blue Sunrise='Blogold' (PBR)
- 'Brookside'
- 'Danny Boy'
- 'Dilys'
- 'Gypsy' (G. × lindavicum)
- 'Ivan'
- 'Mavis Simpson'
- 'Nimbus'
- 'Orion'
- Patricia='Brempat'
- Rothbury Gem='Gerfos'
- Rozanne='Gerwat'
- 'Russell Prichard'
- 'Sirak'
- 'Wageningen'
- 'Wargrave Pink' (G. × oxonianum)

== Gallery ==
Red Geranium in Dang Nepal.

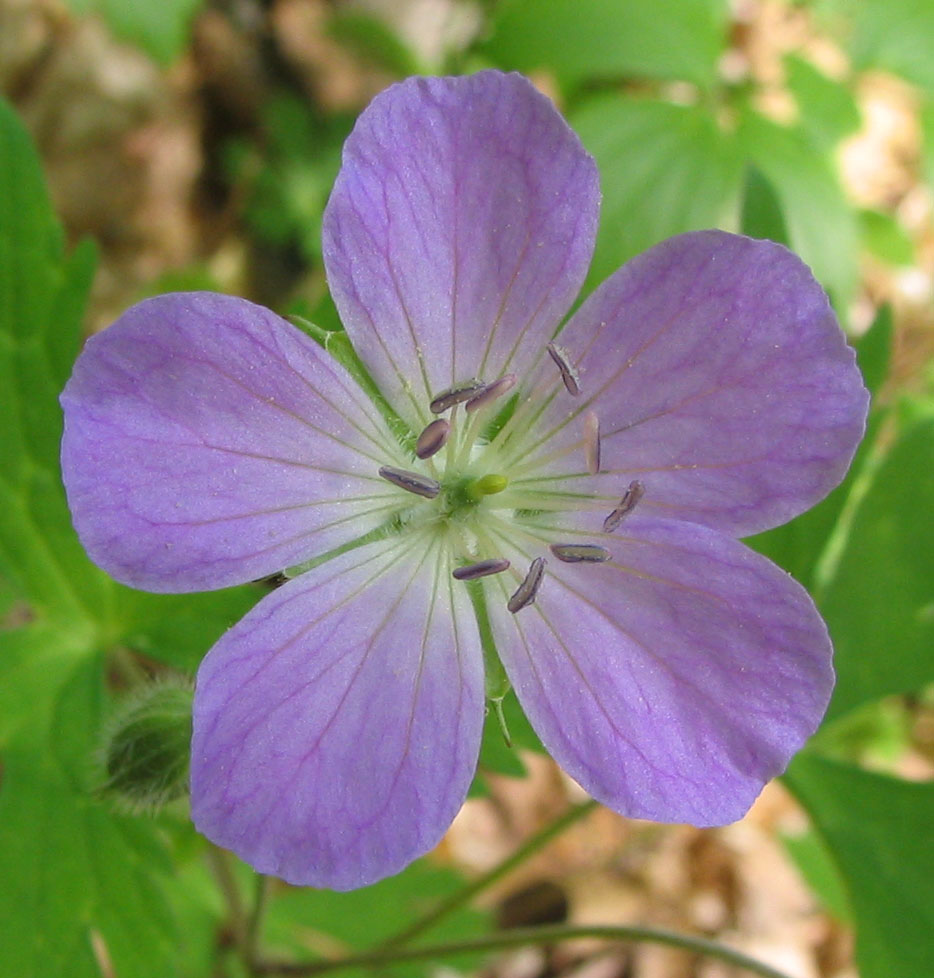
Geranium maculatum, wild cranesbill

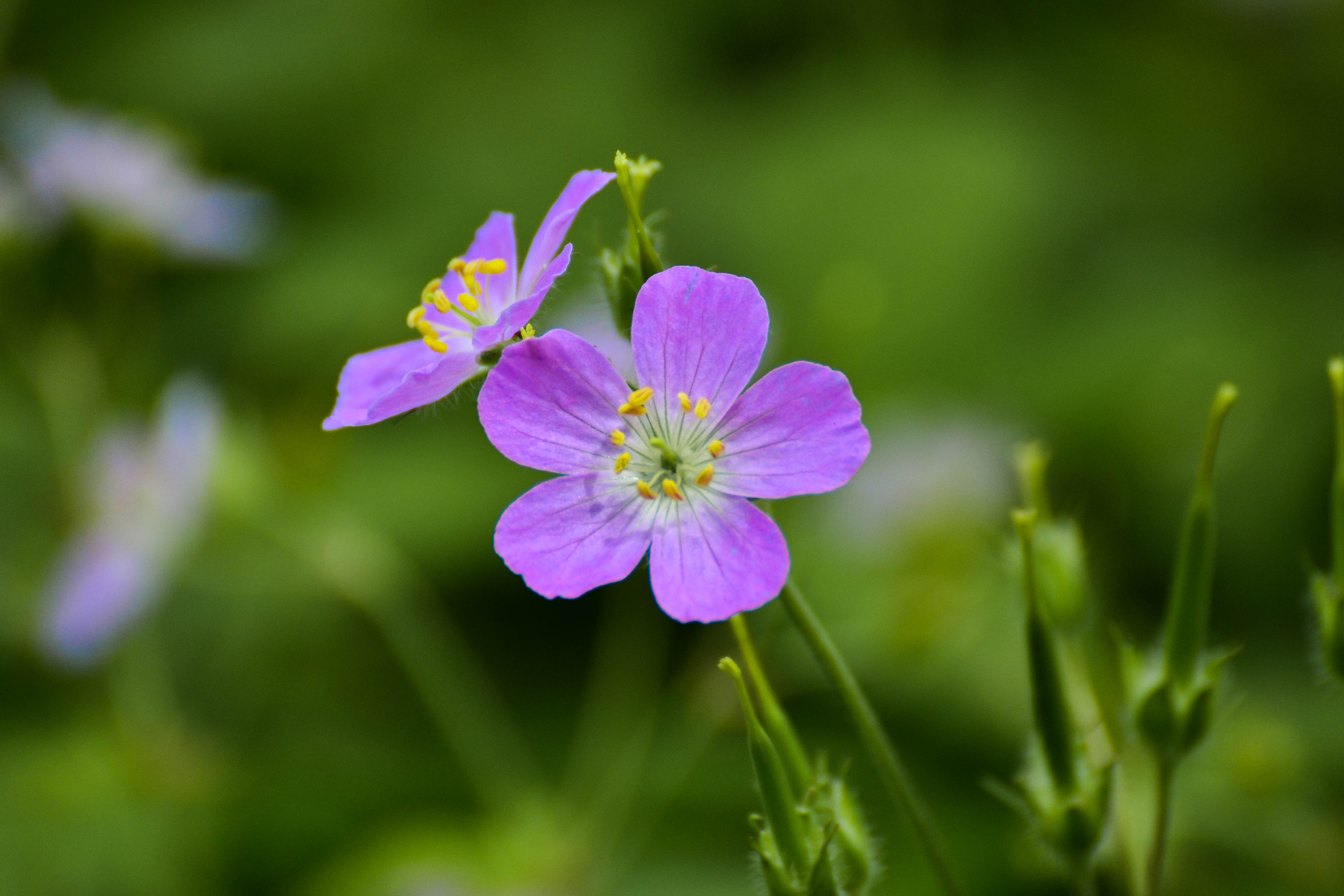
Geranium maculatum

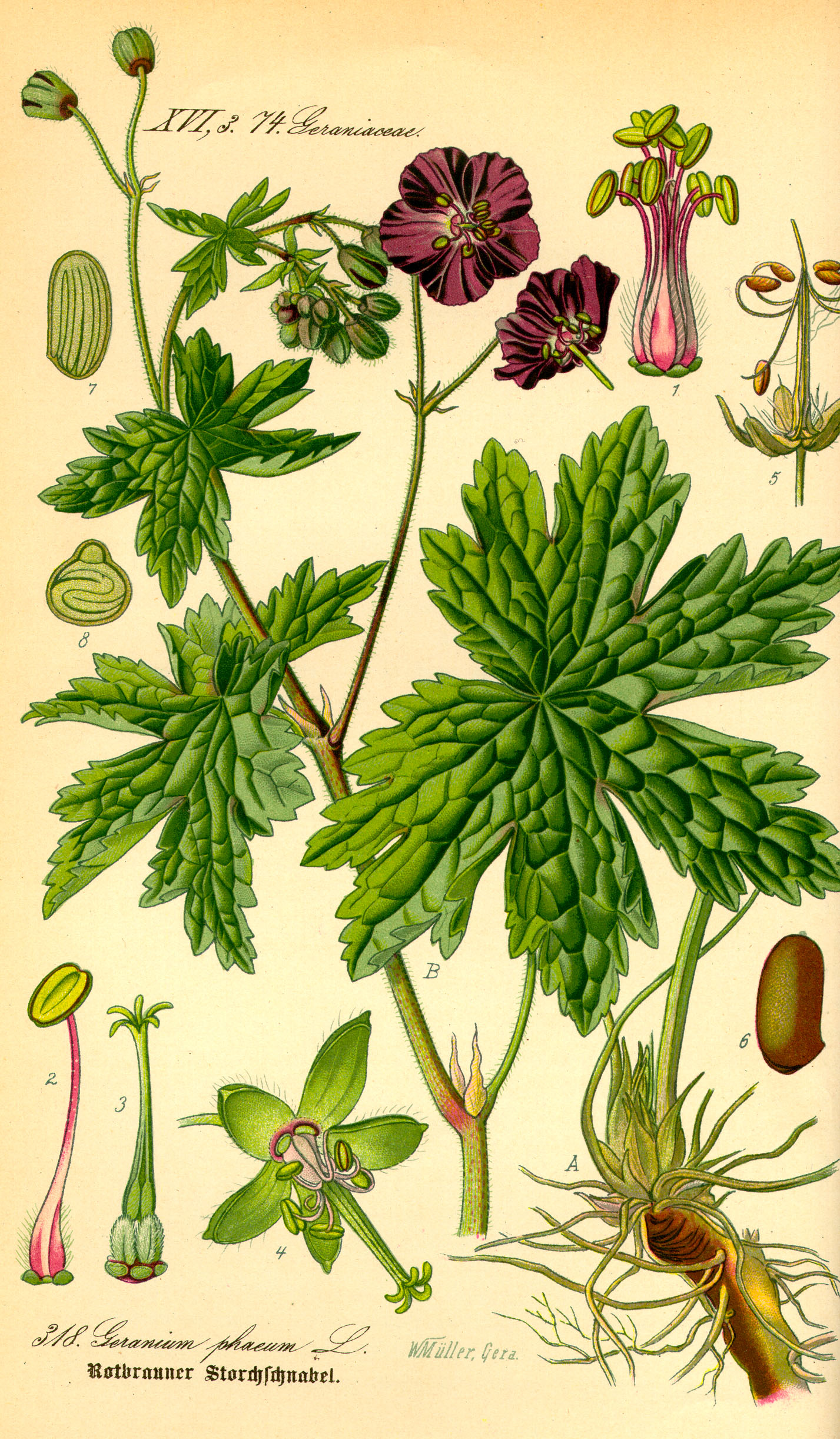
Geranium phaeum - from Thomé Flora von Deutschland, Österreich und der Schweiz 1885

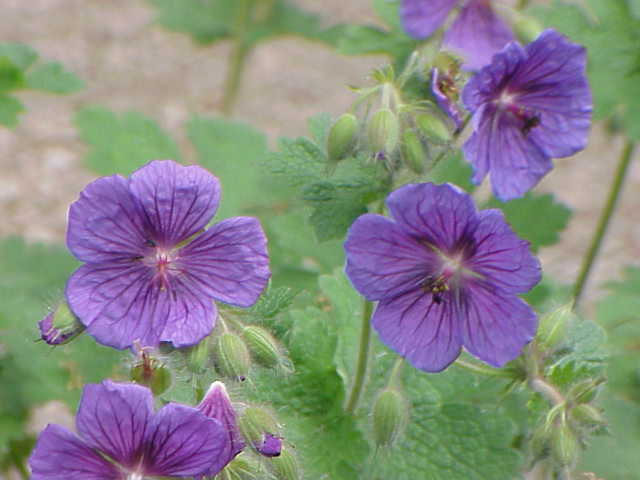
Geranium platypetalum

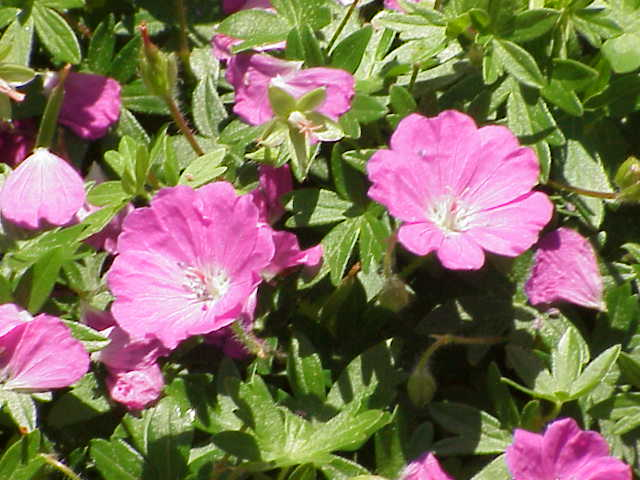
Geranium sanguineum

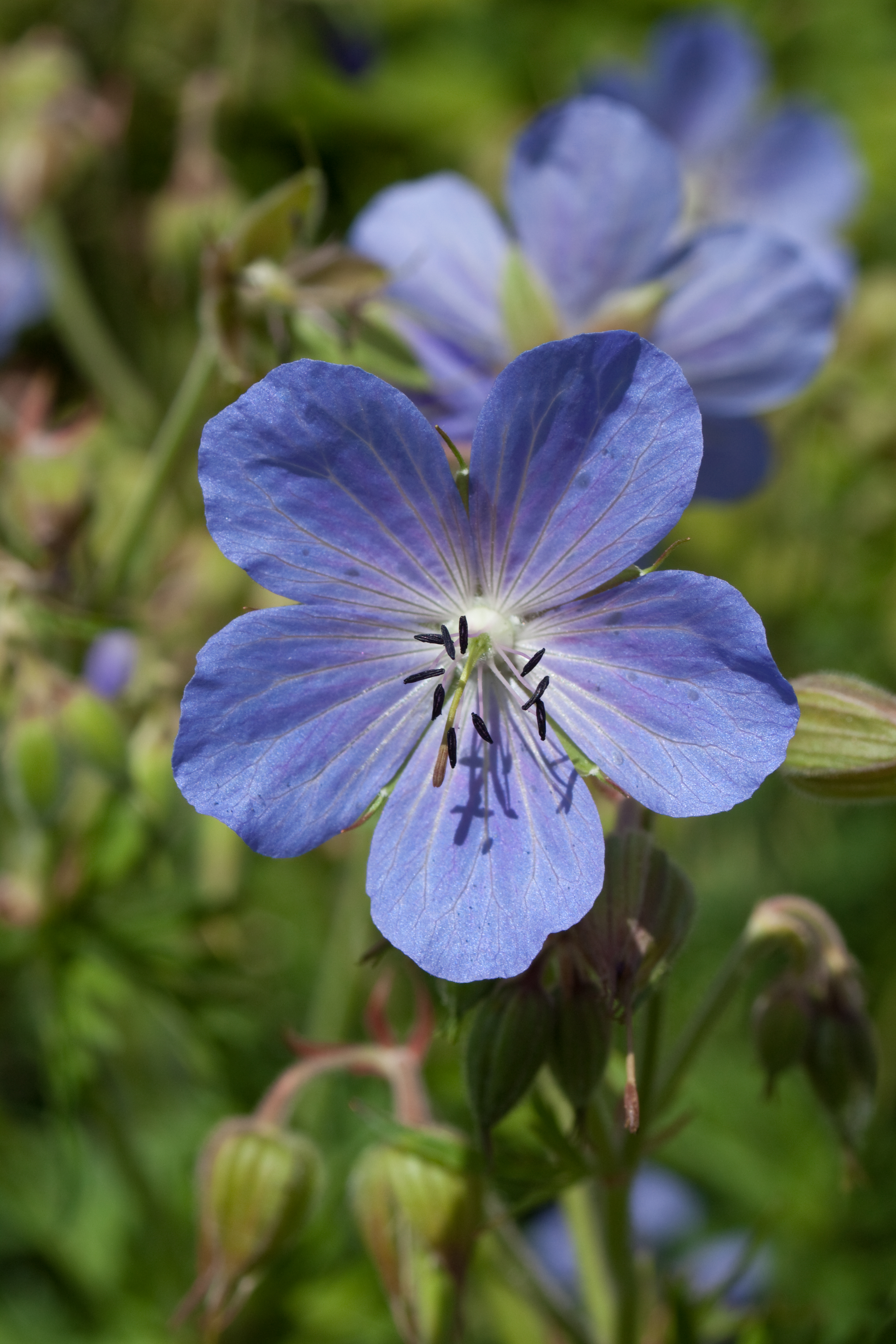
Geranium pratense (meadow cranesbill)

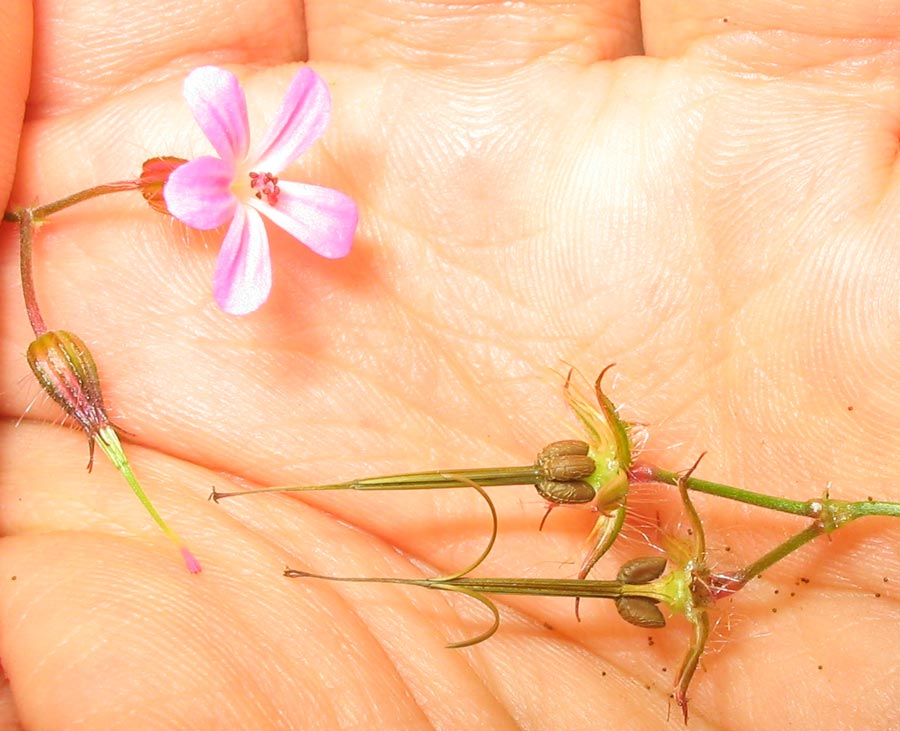
Geranium robertianum (herb robert)

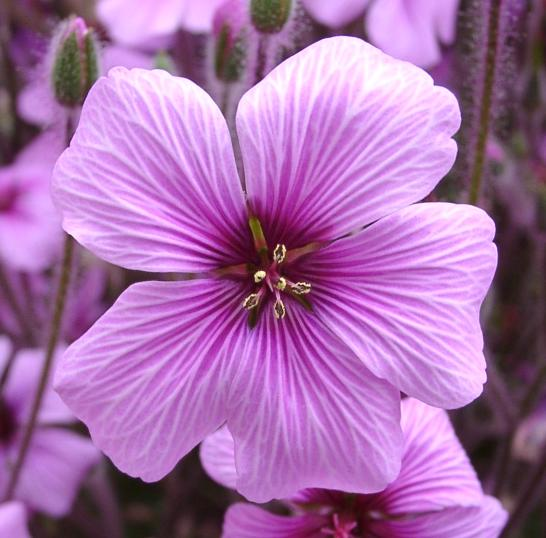
Geranium maderense

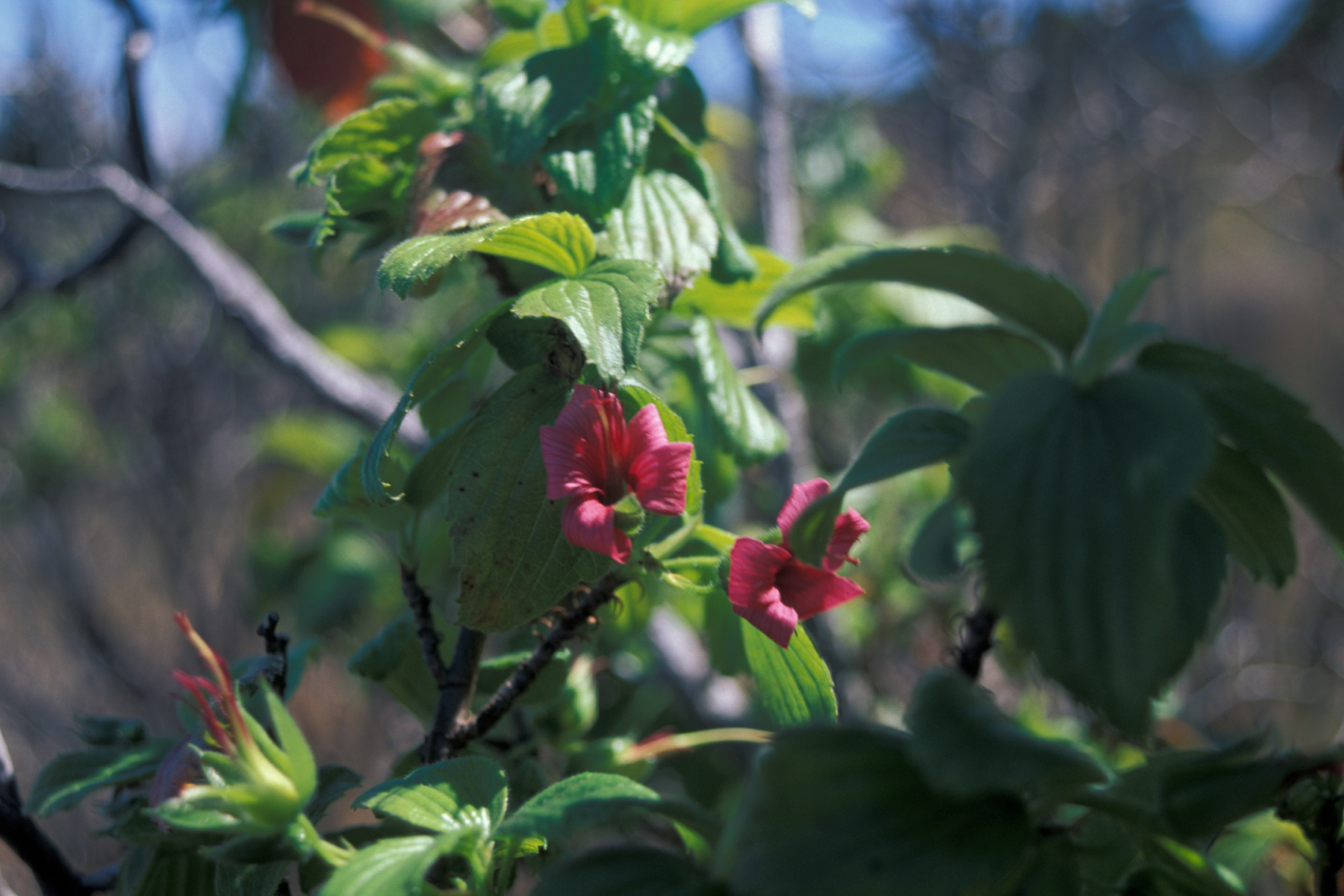
Geranium arboreum

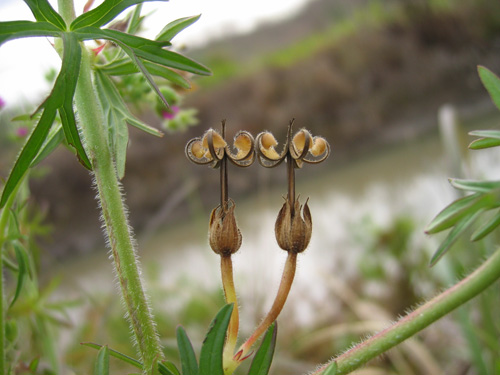
Geranium dissectum

== See also ==
- List of Geranium species

== Bibliography ==
- Aedo, Carlos; Garmendia, Felix Munoz (February 1996). "Some Notes on the Sectional Nomenclature of Geranium (Geraniaceae)". Taxon. 45 (1): 104. doi:10.2307/1222593. JSTOR 1222593.
- Genus Geranium in North America: the Perennials
