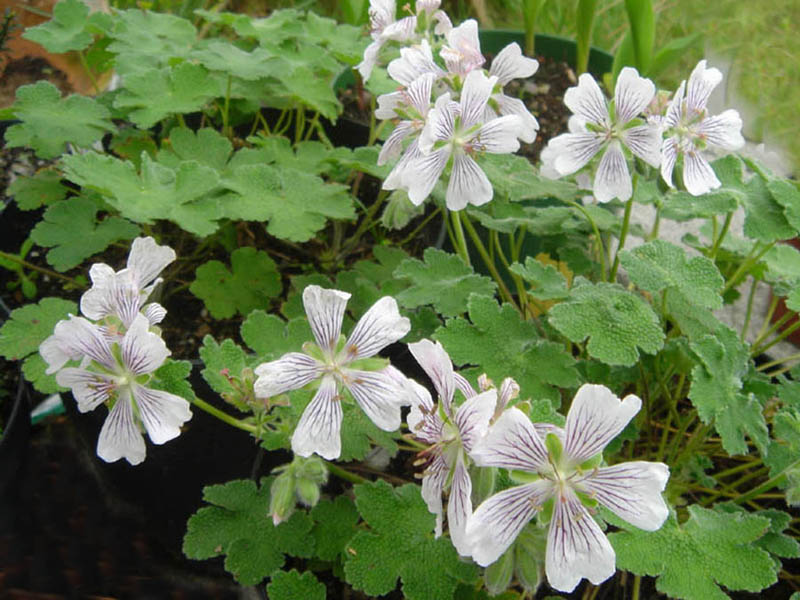

Scientific classification
- Kingdom: Plantae
- Clade: Tracheophytes
- Clade: Angiosperms
- Clade: Eudicots
- Clade: Rosids
- Order: Geraniales
- Family: Geraniaceae
- Genus: Geranium
- Species: G. renardii

Binomial name
- Geranium renardii Trautv.

= Geranium renardii =

Species of flowering plant

Geranium renardii is a species of hardy flowering herbaceous perennial plant in the genus Geranium, family Geraniaceae. It is native to the Caucasus region. Growing to 30 cm (12 in) tall and broad, it has palmate leaves and pale pink flowers striped violet. This plant has gained the Royal Horticultural Society's Award of Garden Merit. It grows well in sunny positions or shade both and well drained soils.

The Latin specific epithet renardii honours the Russian naturalist Charles Claude Renard (1809-1886).
