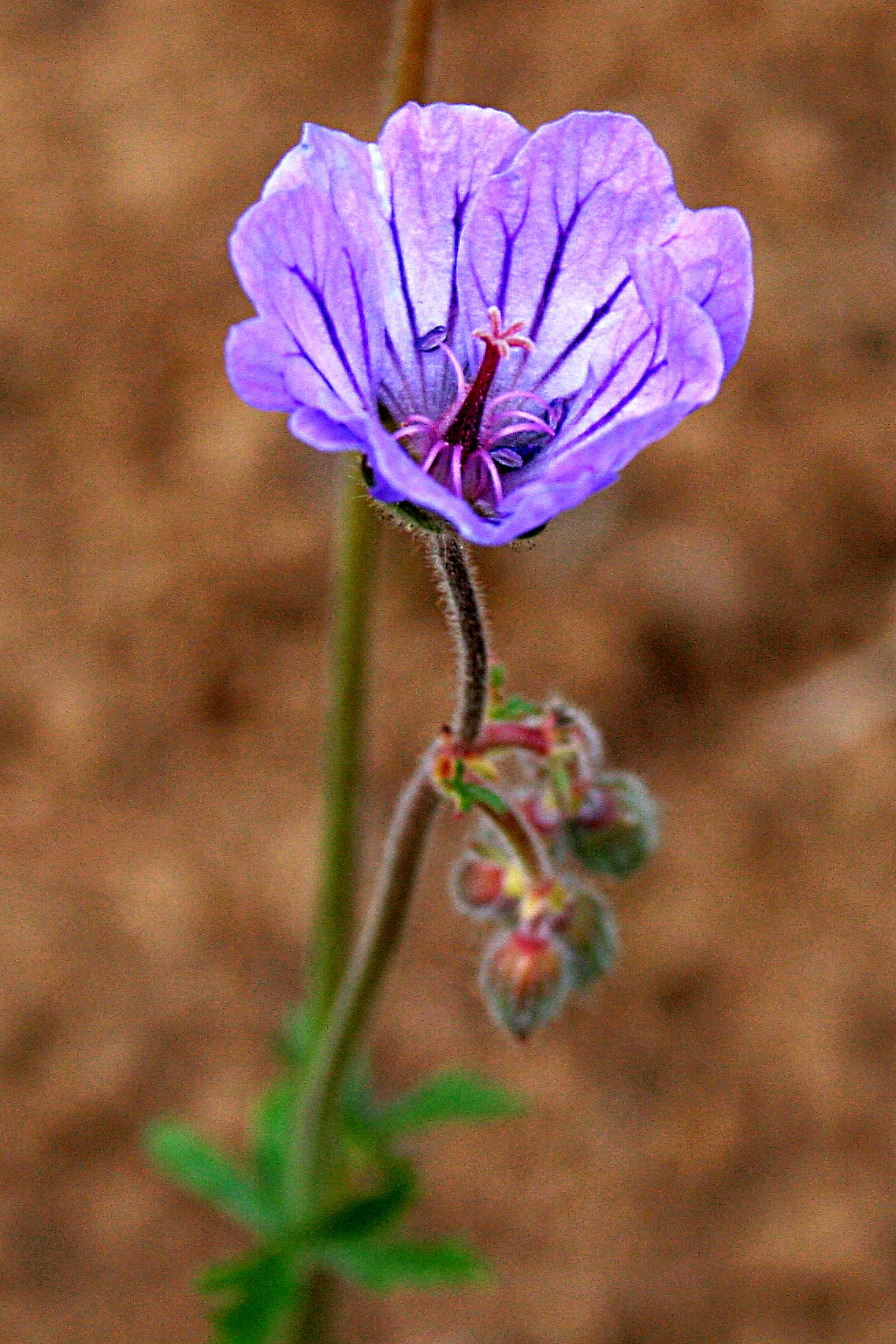
- Flower
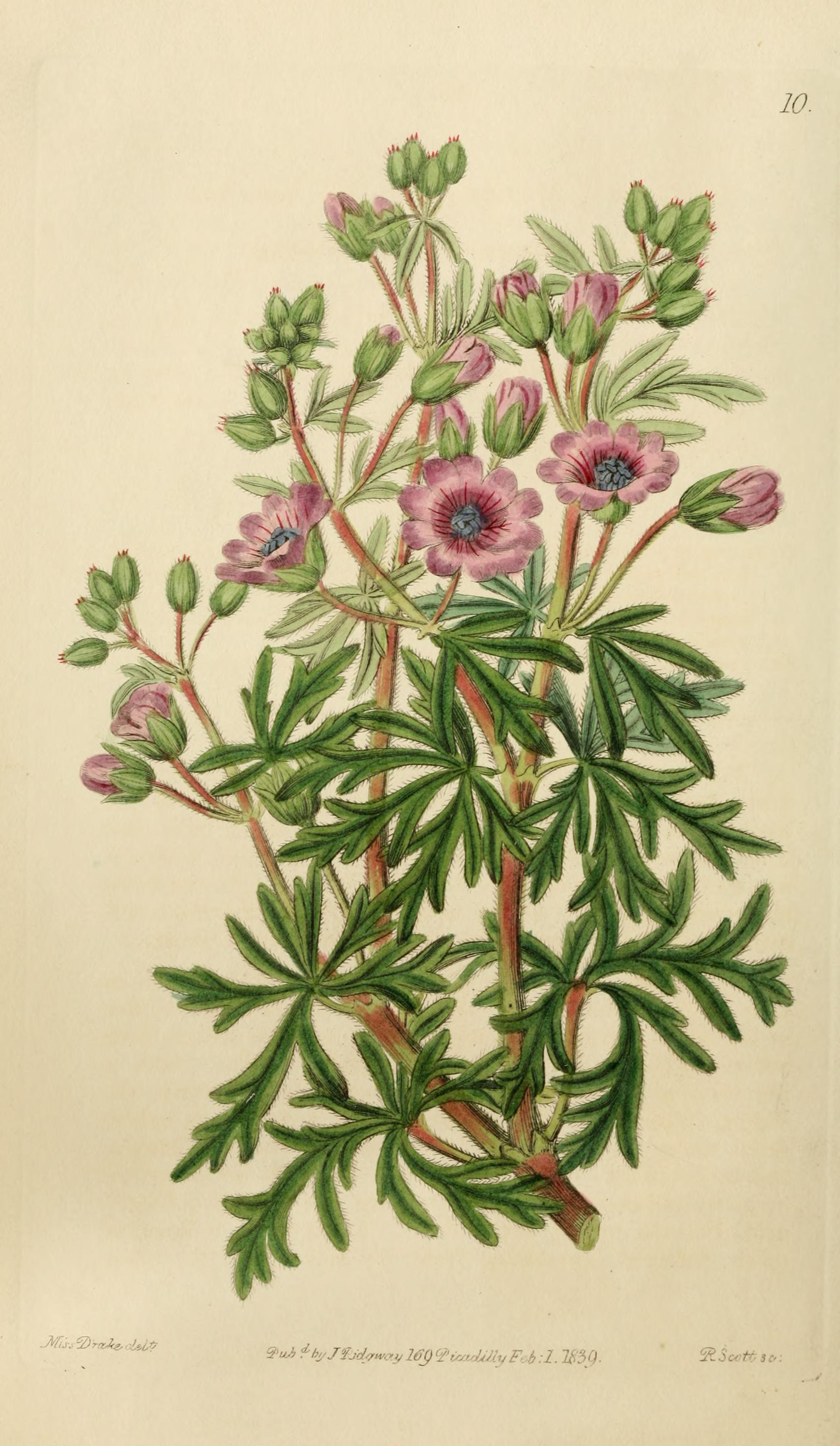
- Botanical illustration

Scientific classification
- Kingdom: Plantae
- Clade: Tracheophytes
- Clade: Angiosperms
- Clade: Eudicots
- Clade: Rosids
- Order: Geraniales
- Family: Geraniaceae
- Genus: Geranium
- Species: G. tuberosum

Binomial name
- Geranium tuberosum L.

Synonyms
- List: Geranium radicatum M.Bieb.; Geranium stepporum P.H.Davis; Geranium tuberosum f. angustilobum Woronow; Geranium tuberosum subsp. deserti-syriacum P.H.Davis; Geranium tuberosum var. incisodentatum Woronow; Geranium tuberosum var. linearifolium Boiss.; Geranium tuberosum subsp. linearifolium (Boiss.) P.H.Davis; Geranium tuberosum subsp. micranthum Schönb.-Tem.; Geranium tuberosum var. pinnatifidum Woronow; Geranium tuberosum var. radicatum Kuntze; Geranium tuberosum var. ramosum Lindl.; Geranium tuberosum var. sefidianum Pau

= Geranium tuberosum =

Species of plant

Geranium tuberosum, the tuberous-rooted cranesbill, is a species of flowering plant in the family Geraniaceae. It is native to the Mediterranean region, the Caucasus, and western Asia. The Royal Horticultural Society considers it a good plant to attract pollinators, and it is widely available from commercial suppliers. There are a number of cultivars available, including 'Rosie's Mauve' and 'Richard Hobbs'.

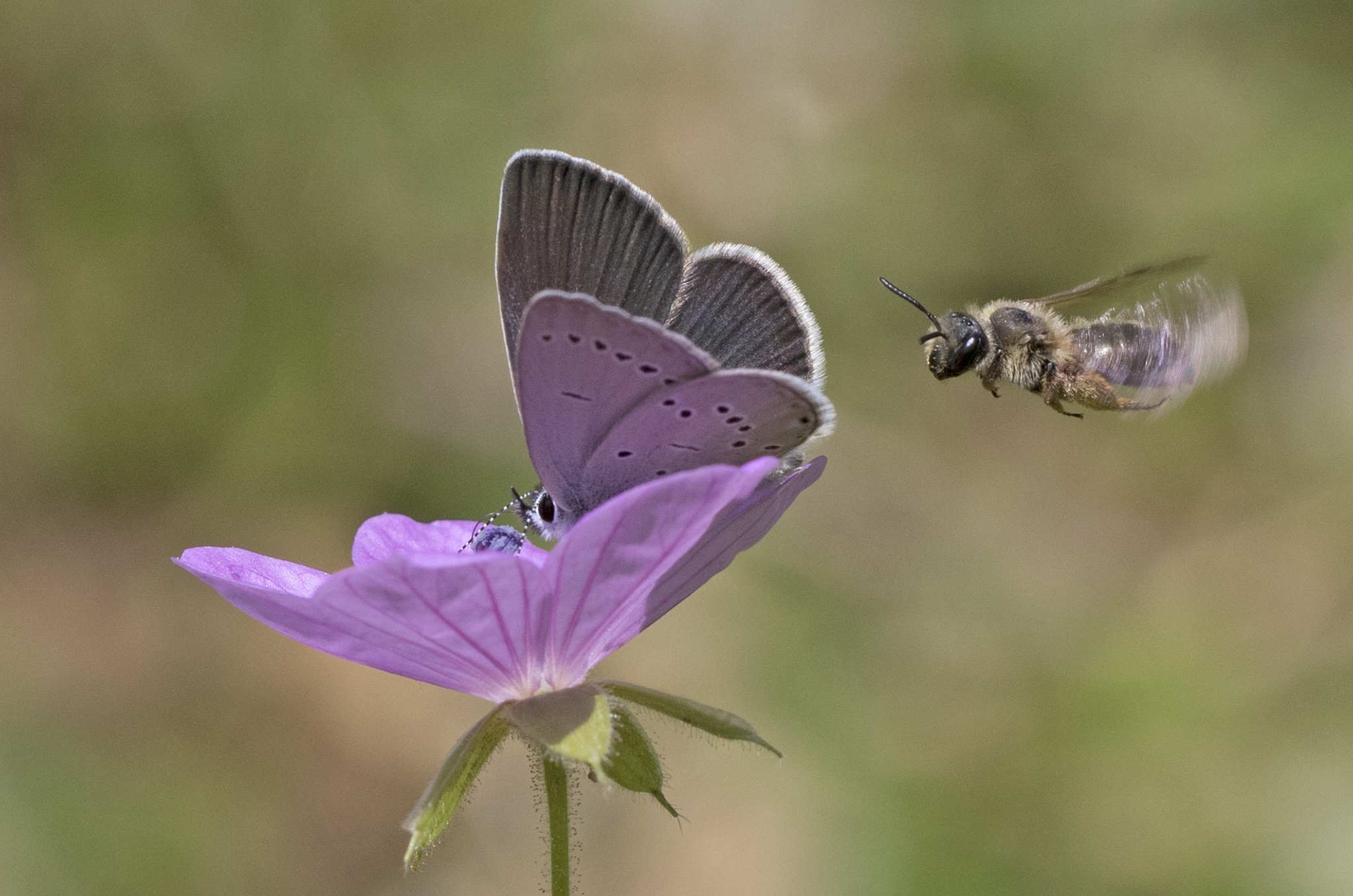
A small blue and a bee

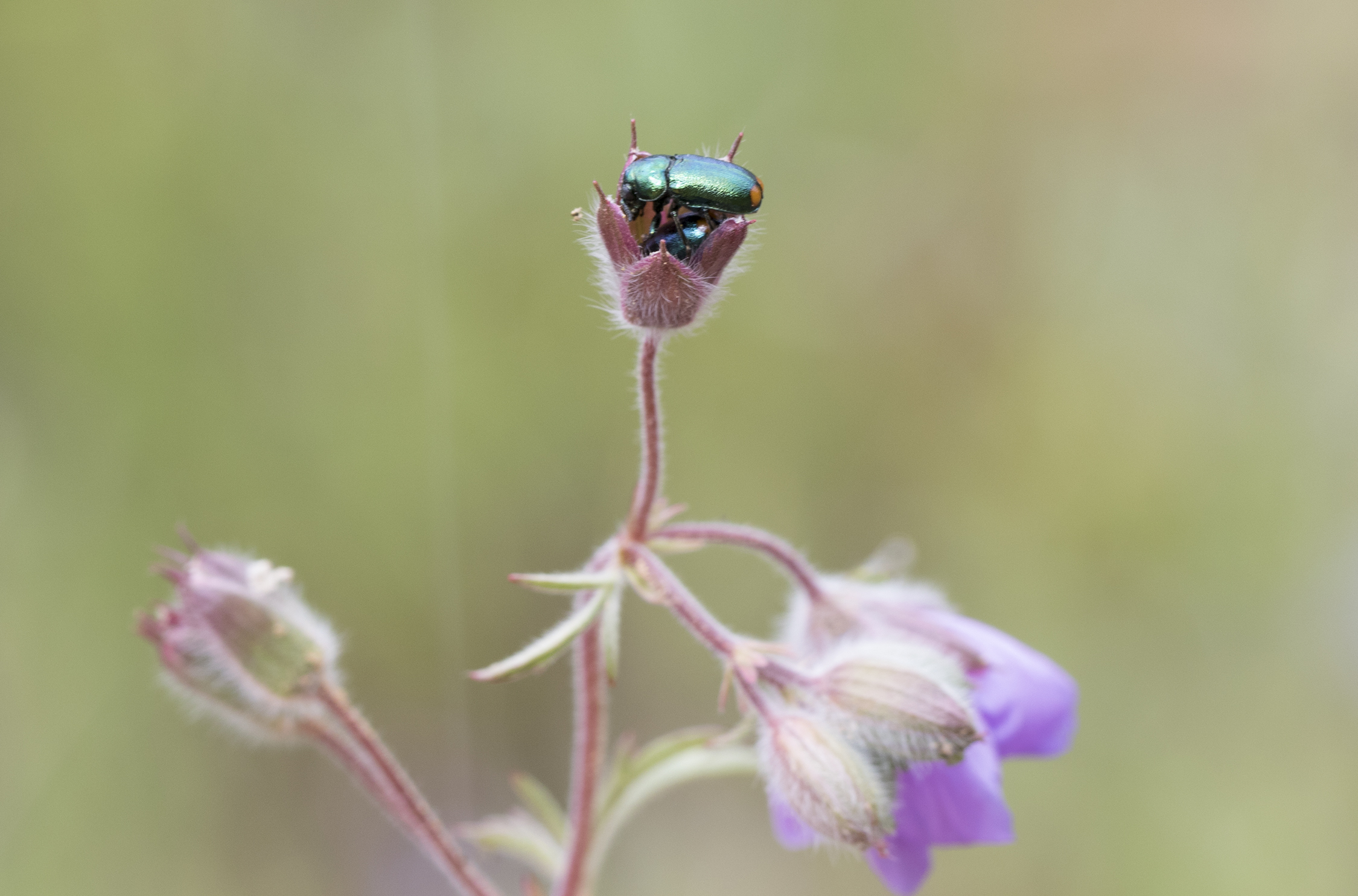
Flower buds and beetles

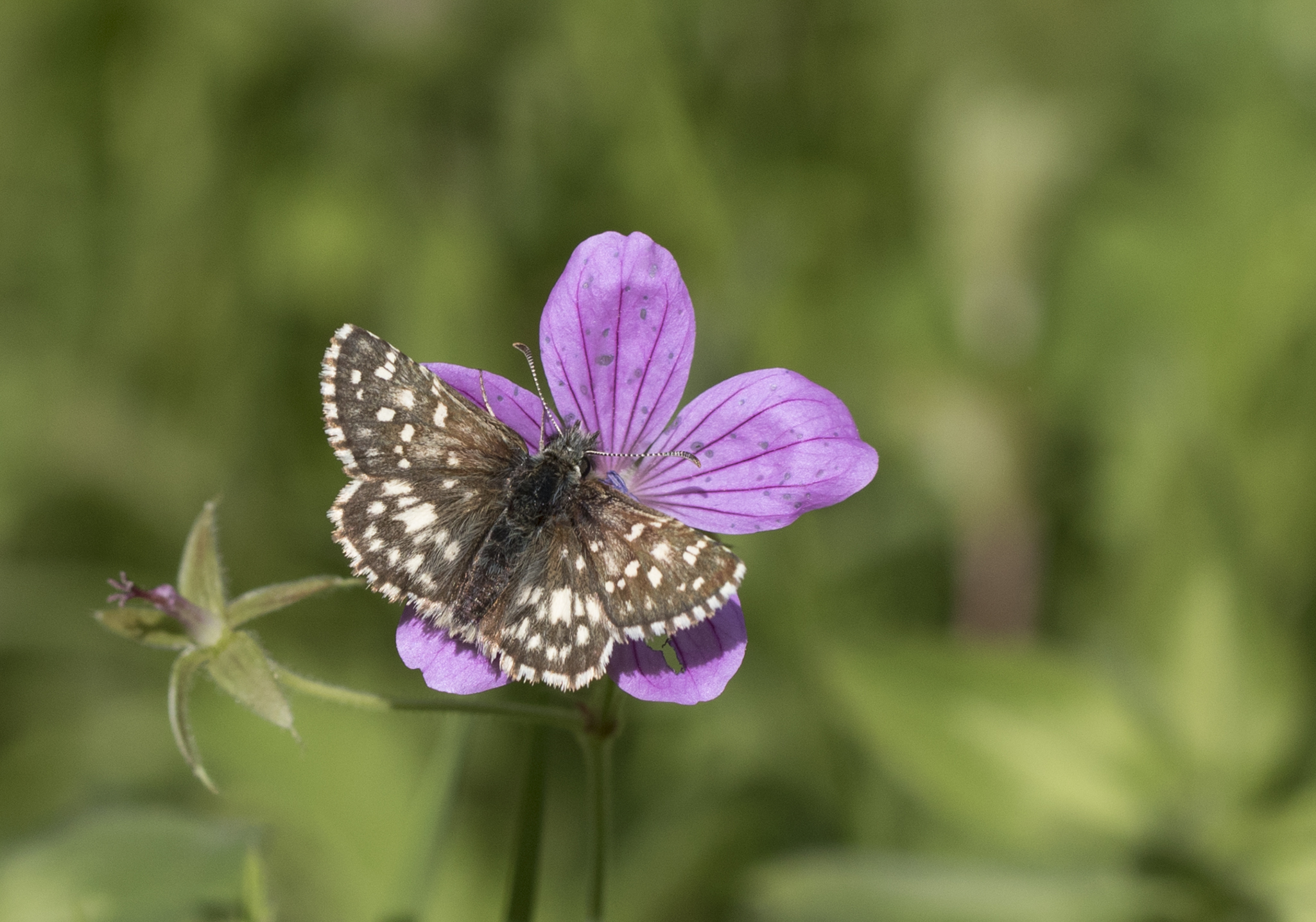
Aegean skipper

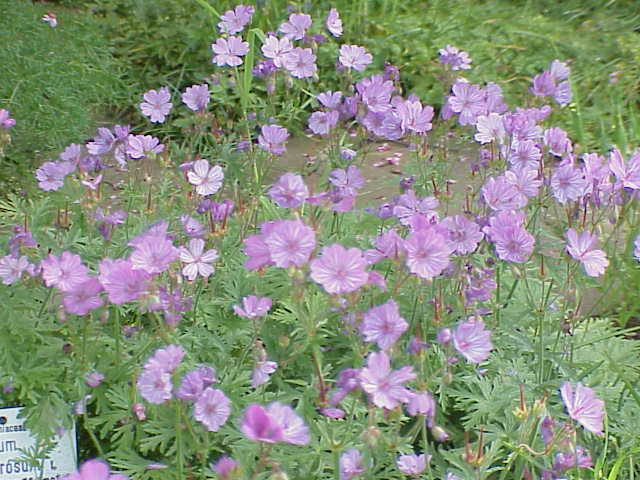
Grouping
