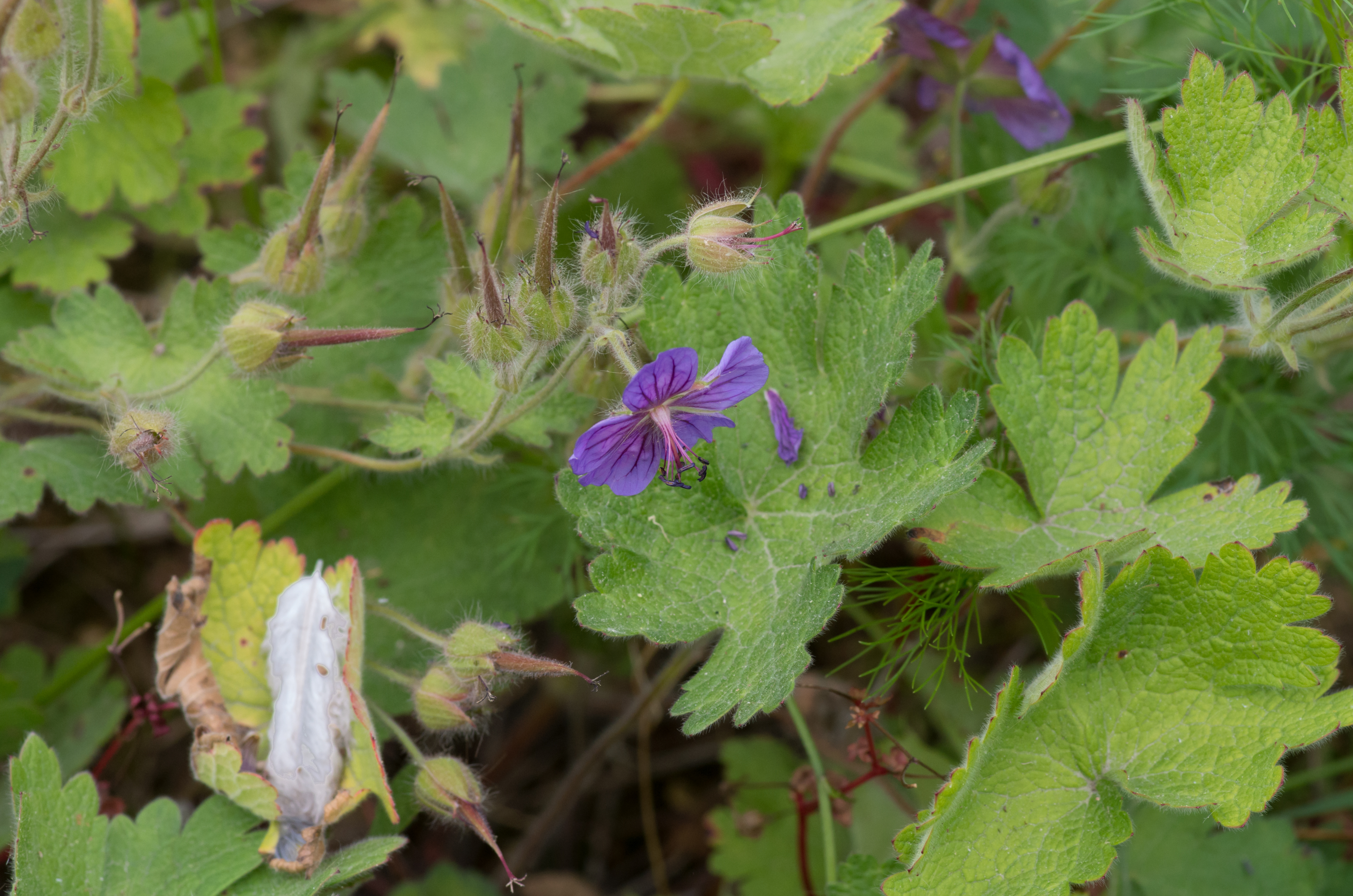

Scientific classification
- Kingdom: Plantae
- Clade: Tracheophytes
- Clade: Angiosperms
- Clade: Eudicots
- Clade: Rosids
- Order: Geraniales
- Family: Geraniaceae
- Genus: Geranium
- Species: G. ibericum

Binomial name
- Geranium ibericum Cav.

Synonyms
- Geranium ibericum subsp. jubatum (Hand.-Mazz.) P. H. Davis; Geranium jubatum Hand.-Mazz.; Geranium montanum Hablitz ex Pall.

= Geranium ibericum =

Species of flowering plant

Geranium ibericum, commonly called Caucasian crane's-bill or (in North America) Iberian geranium or Caucasus geranium, is a herbaceous plant species in the family Geraniaceae. It is native to Western Asia, including Turkey and the Caucasus, and is cultivated as a garden subject. It has a dense mounding habit, and violet colored flowers.
