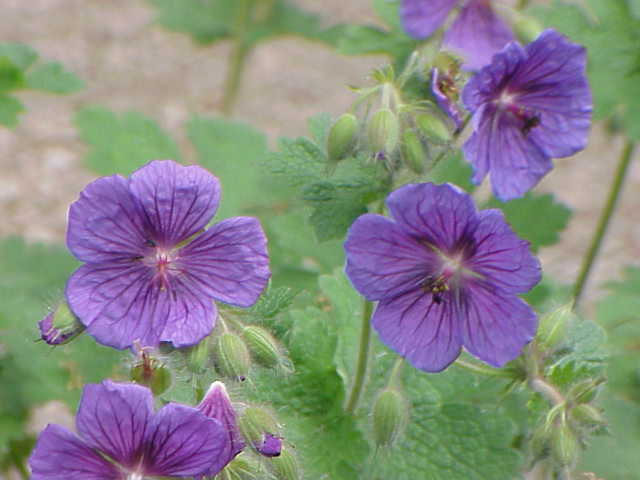

Scientific classification
- Kingdom: Plantae
- Clade: Embryophytes
- Clade: Tracheophytes
- Clade: Spermatophytes
- Clade: Angiosperms
- Clade: Eudicots
- Clade: Rosids
- Order: Geraniales
- Family: Geraniaceae
- Genus: Geranium
- Species: G. platypetalum

Binomial name
- Geranium platypetalum Fisch. & C. A. Mey.

= Geranium platypetalum =

Species of flowering plant

Geranium platypetalum, commonly called glandular crane's-bill or broad-petaled geranium, is a herbaceous plant species in the family Geraniaceae. It is native to Iran, Turkey, Armenia, Azerbaijan, Georgia, and the Russian Federation, and is cultivated as a garden subject, under a number of different cultivar names. It has blue-to-purple coloured flowers.
