= Vácrátót Botanical Garden =

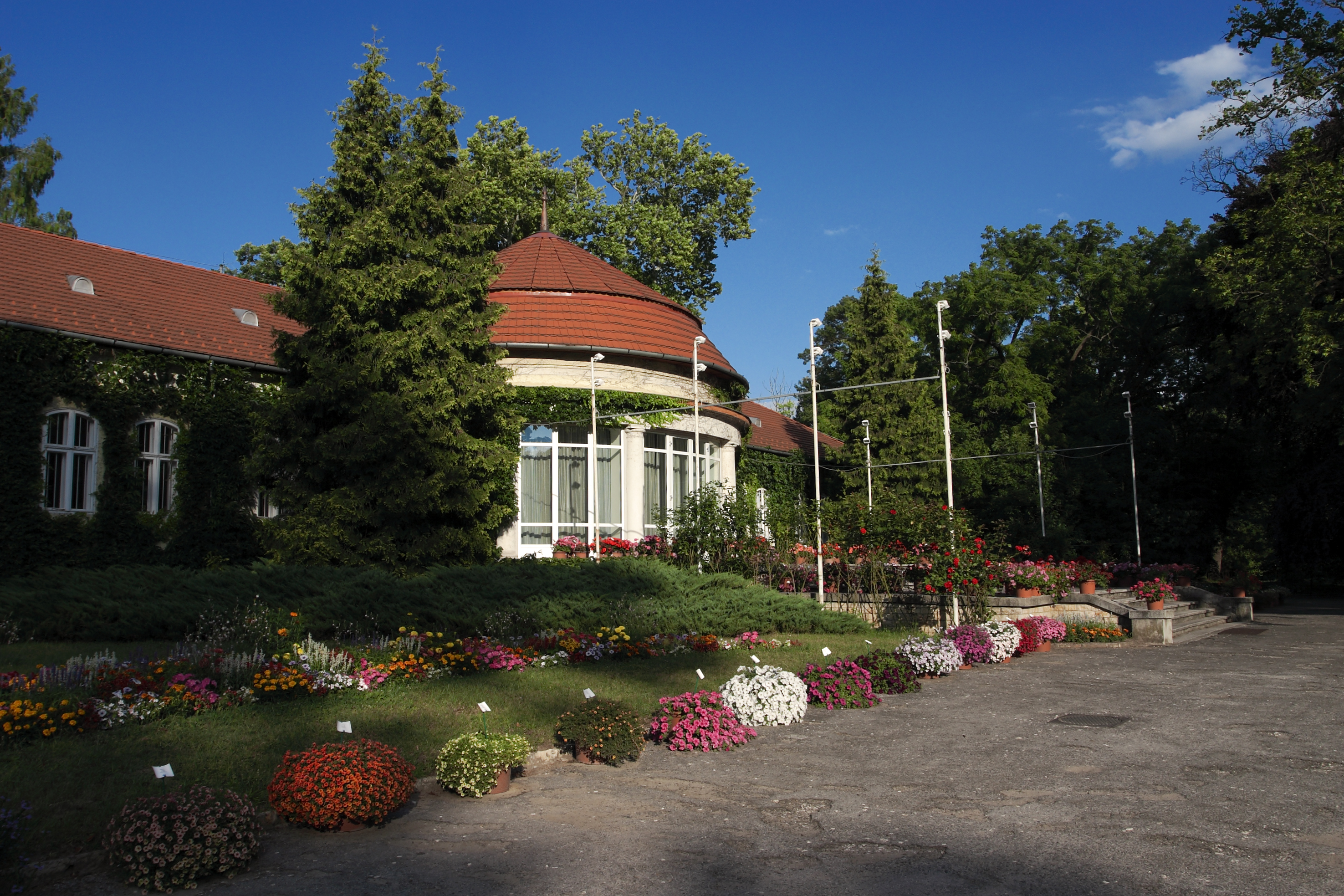
- Interactive map of Vácrátót Botanical Garden
- Type: Botanical
- Location: Vácrátót, Hungary
- Coordinates: 47°42′26″N 19°14′04″E
- Area: 27 ha (67 acres)
- Opened: end of 18th century
- Species: > 13,000
- Website: www.botkert.hu

Vácrátót Botanical Garden (Hungarian: Vácrátóti botanikus kert) is a botanical garden in Hungary maintained by the Hungarian Academy of Sciences. It is located in Vácrátót, some 30 kilometers north of Budapest. The institution is participating in a QRpedia project with Wikimedia Hungary, linking selected plants to their Wikipedia articles.

In the rock garden collection flowers from all six phytochoria and from 25 high altitude mountain ranges of the world can be seen.
