= List of Canadian plants by family G =

Main page: List of Canadian plants by family

The following families of vascular plants are listed as occurring in Canada:

For mosses of Canada, see:

== Gentianaceae ==
- Bartonia paniculata — twining bartonia
- Bartonia virginica — yellow screwstem
- Centaurium muehlenbergii — Monterey centaury
- Frasera albicaulis — purple green-gentian
- Frasera caroliniensis (= Swertia caroliniensis) — Carolina gentian
- Gentiana affinis — prairie gentian
- Gentiana alba — yellow gentian
- Gentiana andrewsii — fringe-top bottle gentian
- Gentiana calycosa — explorer's gentian
- Gentiana clausa — closed gentian
- Gentiana douglasiana — swamp gentian
- Gentiana fremontii — moss gentian
- Gentiana glauca — glaucous gentian
- Gentiana linearis — narrowleaf gentian
- Gentiana nivalis — snow gentian
- Gentiana platypetala — broadpetal gentian
- Gentiana prostrata — pygmy gentian
- Gentiana puberulenta — downy gentian
- Gentiana rubricaulis — closed gentian
- Gentiana sceptrum — Pacific gentian
- Gentiana x billingtonii
- Gentiana x grandilacustris
- Gentiana x pallidocyanea
- Gentianella amarella — northern gentian
- Gentianella propinqua — four-part gentian
- Gentianella quinquefolia — stiff gentian
- Gentianella tenella — Dane's gentian
- Gentianopsis crinita — fringed gentian
- Gentianopsis detonsa — sheared gentian
- Gentianopsis macounii — Macoun's gentian
- Gentianopsis nesophila — island gentian
- Gentianopsis procera — lesser fringed gentian
- Gentianopsis victorinii — Victorin's gentian
- Halenia deflexa — spurred gentian
- Lomatogonium rotatum — marsh felwort
- Sabatia kennedyana — Plymouth gentian
- Swertia caroliniensis — Carolina gentian
- Swertia perennis — felwort
- Zeltnera exaltata — tall centaury

== Geocalycaceae ==
- Geocalyx graveolens
- Harpanthus drummondii
- Harpanthus flotovianus
- Harpanthus scutatus

== Geraniaceae ==
- Geranium bicknellii — Bicknell's northern crane's-bill
- Geranium carolinianum — Carolina crane's-bill
- Geranium erianthum — northern crane's-bill
- Geranium maculatum — wild crane's-bill
- Geranium oreganum — Oregon crane's-bill
- Geranium richardsonii — Richardson's geranium
- Geranium robertianum — herb-Robert
- Geranium viscosissimum — sticky geranium

== Grimmiaceae ==
- Coscinodon calyptratus
- Coscinodon cribrosus — copper coscinodon
- Dryptodon patens
- Grimmia affinis
- Grimmia anodon
- Grimmia anomala
- Grimmia atrata
- Grimmia donniana
- Grimmia elatior
- Grimmia elongata
- Grimmia funalis
- Grimmia hartmanii
- Grimmia hermannii
- Grimmia incurva
- Grimmia laevigata
- Grimmia mollis
- Grimmia montana
- Grimmia olneyi
- Grimmia ovalis
- Grimmia pilifera
- Grimmia plagiopodia
- Grimmia poecilostoma
- Grimmia pulvinata
- Grimmia reflexidens
- Grimmia tenerrima
- Grimmia teretinervis
- Grimmia torngakiana
- Grimmia torquata
- Grimmia trichophylla
- Grimmia unicolor
- Jaffueliobryum raui
- Jaffueliobryum wrightii
- Racomitrium aciculare
- Racomitrium affine
- Racomitrium aquaticum
- Racomitrium canescens — silver moss
- Racomitrium depressum
- Racomitrium elongatum
- Racomitrium ericoides
- Racomitrium fasciculare
- Racomitrium heterostichum
- Racomitrium lanuginosum — woolly moss
- Racomitrium lawtonae
- Racomitrium macounii
- Racomitrium microcarpon
- Racomitrium muticum
- Racomitrium occidentale
- Racomitrium pacificum
- Racomitrium panschii
- Racomitrium pygmaeum
- Racomitrium sudeticum
- Racomitrium varium
- Schistidium agassizii
- Schistidium andreaeopsis
- Schistidium apocarpum
- Schistidium boreale
- Schistidium confertum
- Schistidium crassipilum
- Schistidium frigidum
- Schistidium heterophyllum
- Schistidium lancifolium
- Schistidium maritimum
- Schistidium obtusifolium
- Schistidium pulchrum
- Schistidium pulvinatum
- Schistidium rivulare
- Schistidium robustum
- Schistidium tenerum
- Schistidium trichodon

== Grossulariaceae ==
- Ribes acerifolium — Howell's gooseberry
- Ribes americanum — wild black currant
- Ribes aureum — golden currant
- Ribes bracteosum — California black currant
- Ribes cereum — wax currant
- Ribes cynosbati — prickly gooseberry
- Ribes divaricatum — straggly gooseberry
- Ribes glandulosum — skunk currant
- Ribes hirtellum — smooth gooseberry
- Ribes hudsonianum — northern black currant
- Ribes inerme — whitestem gooseberry
- Ribes lacustre — bristly black currant
- Ribes laxiflorum — trailing black currant
- Ribes lobbii — pioneer gooseberry
- Ribes montigenum — alpine prickly gooseberry
- Ribes oxyacanthoides — Canada gooseberry
- Ribes sanguineum — winter currant
- Ribes triste — swamp red currant
- Ribes viscosissimum — sticky gooseberry
- Ribes watsonianum — Watson's gooseberry

== Gymnomitriaceae ==
- Gymnomitrion apiculatum
- Gymnomitrion concinnatum
- Gymnomitrion corallioides
- Gymnomitrion pacificum
- Marsupella alpina
- Marsupella arctica
- Marsupella boeckii
- Marsupella brevissima
- Marsupella commutata
- Marsupella condensata
- Marsupella emarginata
- Marsupella paroica
- Marsupella revoluta
- Marsupella sparsifolia
- Marsupella sphacelata
- Marsupella ustulata
