= List of Geraniales of Montana =

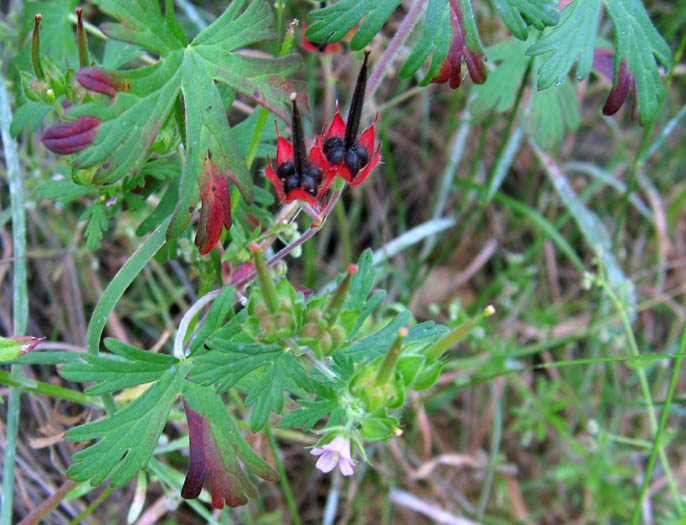
Carolina crane's-bill, Geranium carolinianum

There are at least 16 members of the geranium, impatiens and wood sorrel order, Geraniales, found in Montana. Some of these species are exotics (not native to Montana) and some species have been designated as Species of Concern.

== Geranium ==
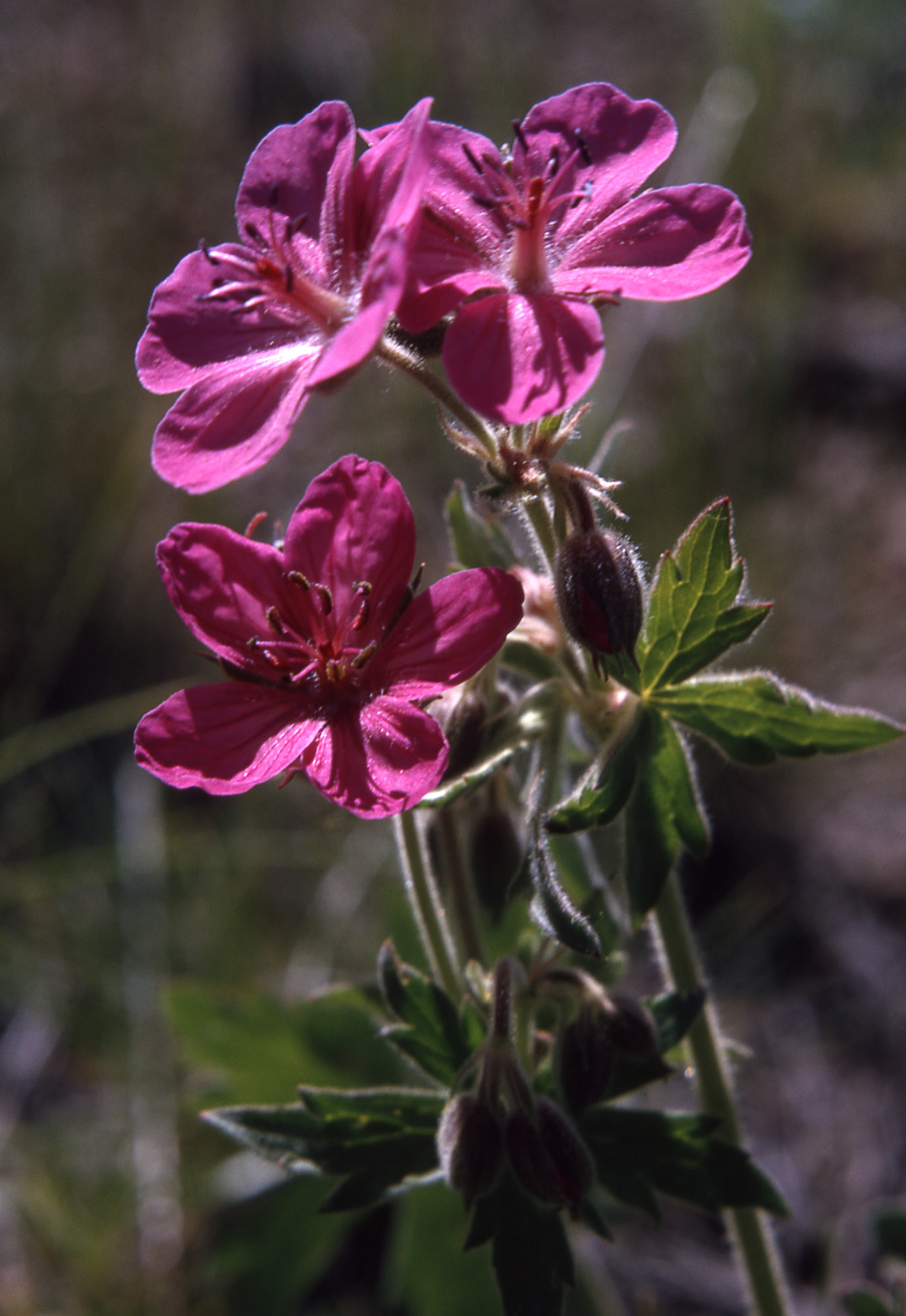
Sticky geranium, Geranium viscosissimum

Family: Geraniaceae

- Erodium cicutarium, stork's bill
- Geranium bicknellii, Bicknell's geranium
- Geranium carolinianum, Carolina crane's-bill
- Geranium molle, dove's-foot crane's-bill
- Geranium pusillum, small-flower crane's-bill
- Geranium richardsonii, Richardson's geranium
- Geranium robertianum, Robert geranium
- Geranium viscosissimum, sticky geranium
- Geranium viscosissimum var. incisum, sticky purple geranium
- Geranium viscosissimum var. viscosissimum, sticky purple geranium

== Impatiens ==
Family: Balsaminaceae

- Impatiens aurella, pale-yellow jewel-weed
- Impatiens ecalcarata, spurless touch-me-not

== Meadow-foam ==
Family: Limnanthaceae

- Floerkea proserpinacoides, false mermaidweed

== Woodsorrel ==
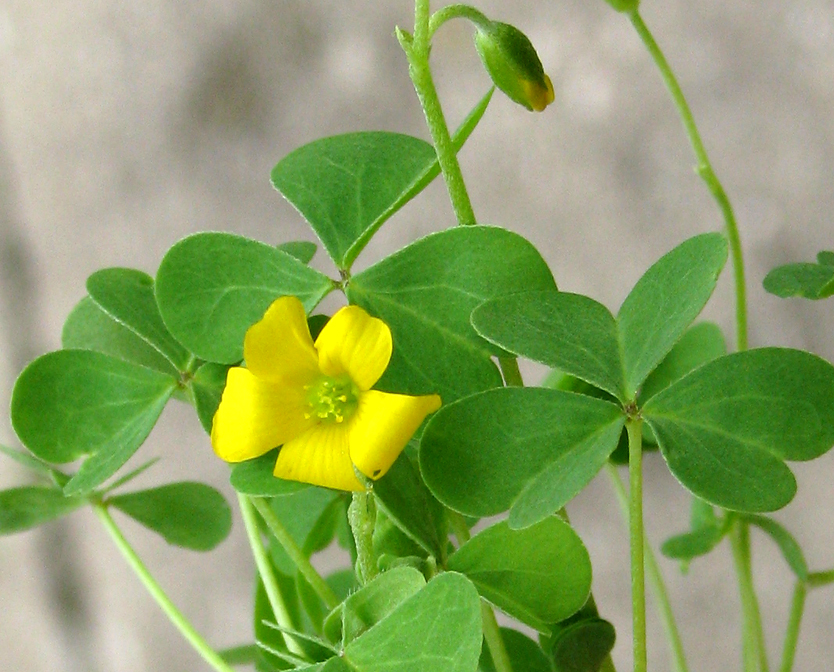
Common yellow wood-sorrel, Oxalis stricta

Family: Oxalidaceae

- Oxalis corniculata, creeping woodsorrel
- Oxalis dillenii, Dillen's woodsorrel
- Oxalis stricta, common yellow wood-sorrel

== See also ==
- List of dicotyledons of Montana
