= Bridge Creek Falls (Deschutes County, Oregon) =

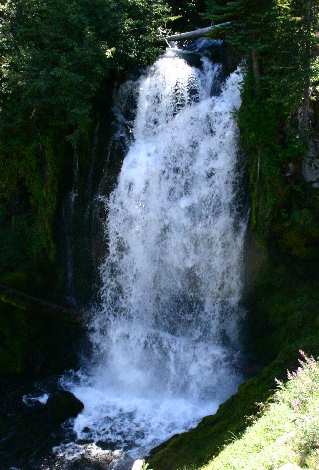
- Interactive map of Bridge Creek Falls
- Location: Cascade Range west of Bend in the U.S. state of Oregon
- Coordinates: 44°01′49″N 121°34′49″W
- Type: Plunge
- Elevation: 5,285 feet (1,611 m)
- Total height: 25 feet (7.6 m)
- Watercourse: Bridge Creek

Bridge Creek Falls is a 25-foot (7.6 m) waterfall on Bridge Creek, in the Cascade Range west of Bend in the U.S. state of Oregon. Additional waterfalls are downstream along nearby Tumalo Creek, of which Bridge Creek is a tributary, including Tumalo Falls. All of these falls are within the Deschutes National Forest and is within the municipal watershed for the city of Bend.

The United States Forest Service manages the Bridge Creek Falls Trail about 14 miles (23 km) from Bend by forest roads. The trail is approximately 14 miles (23 km) from the Tumalo Falls day-use area and picnic site and which offers access to trails for hiking and mountain biking. Using the site requires a Northwest Forest Pass or payment of a fee.

The Tumalo Falls Trail leads from the picnic area to Tumalo Falls, upstream of which continues a trail to Bridge Creek Falls.

== See also ==
- Tumalo State Park
- List of waterfalls
- List of waterfalls in Oregon
