= Streptomyces geranii =

Scientific classification
- Domain: Bacteria
- Kingdom: Bacillati
- Phylum: Actinomycetota
- Class: Actinomycetia
- Order: Streptomycetales
- Family: Streptomycetaceae
- Genus: Streptomyces
- Species: S. geranii

Binomial name
- Streptomyces geranii Li et al. 2018

Type strain
- A301

Species of bacterium

Streptomyces geranii is a bacterium species from the genus of Streptomyces which has been isolated from the root of a Geranium carolinianum plant from the Mount Emei in China.

== See also ==
- List of Streptomyces species
