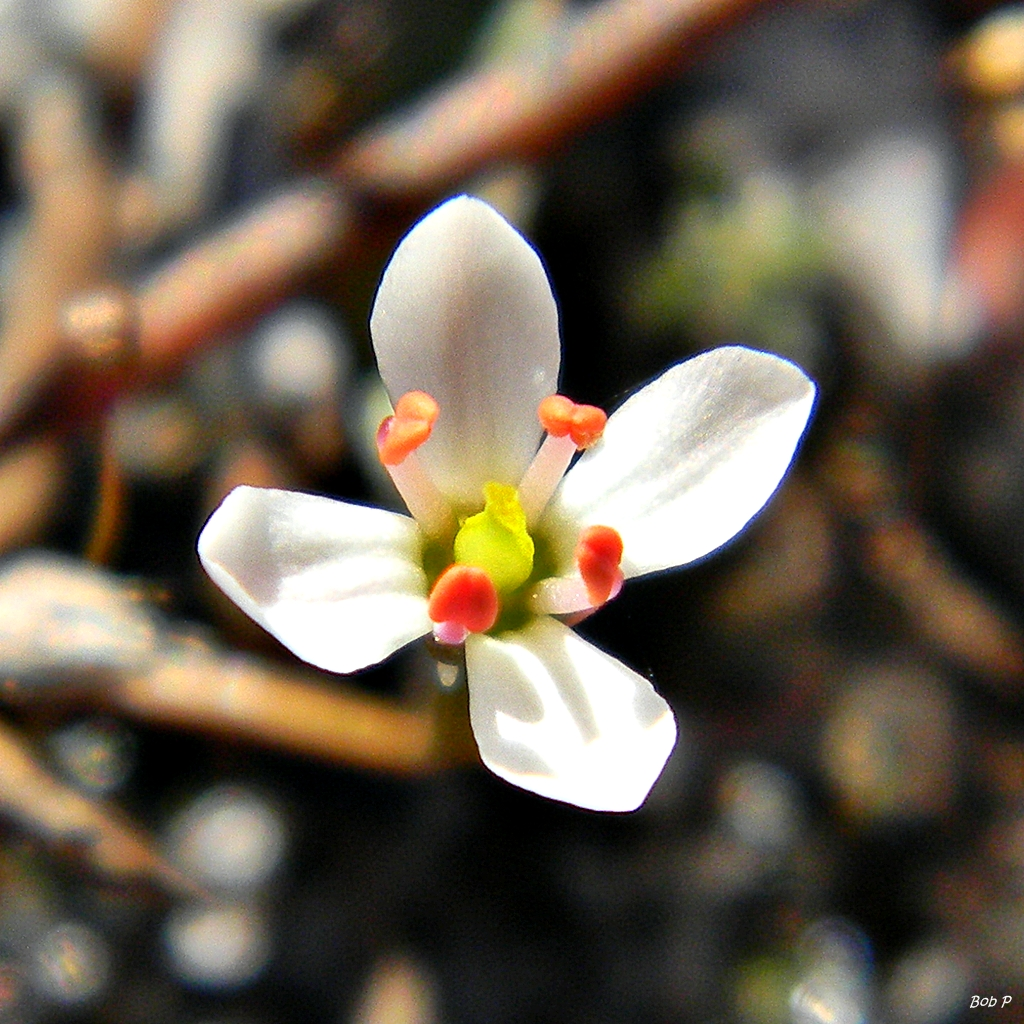
- Bartonia verna

Scientific classification
- Kingdom: Plantae
- Clade: Tracheophytes
- Clade: Angiosperms
- Clade: Eudicots
- Clade: Asterids
- Order: Gentianales
- Family: Gentianaceae
- Subtribe: Swertiinae
- Genus: Bartonia; Muhl. ex Willd.

= Bartonia =

Genus of plants

Bartonia is a genus of the gentian family, tribe Gentianeae, subtribe Swertiinae. Members of this genus are called screwstems. Bartonia was also the name of a genus in the Loasaceae family, but those species are now generally classified under the genus Mentzelia.

As of August 2020, Kew's Plants of the World Online accepts three species of Bartonia:

- Bartonia paniculata (Michx.) Muhl.
- Bartonia verna (Michx.) Raf. ex Barton
- Bartonia virginica (L.) Britton, Sterns & Poggenb.
