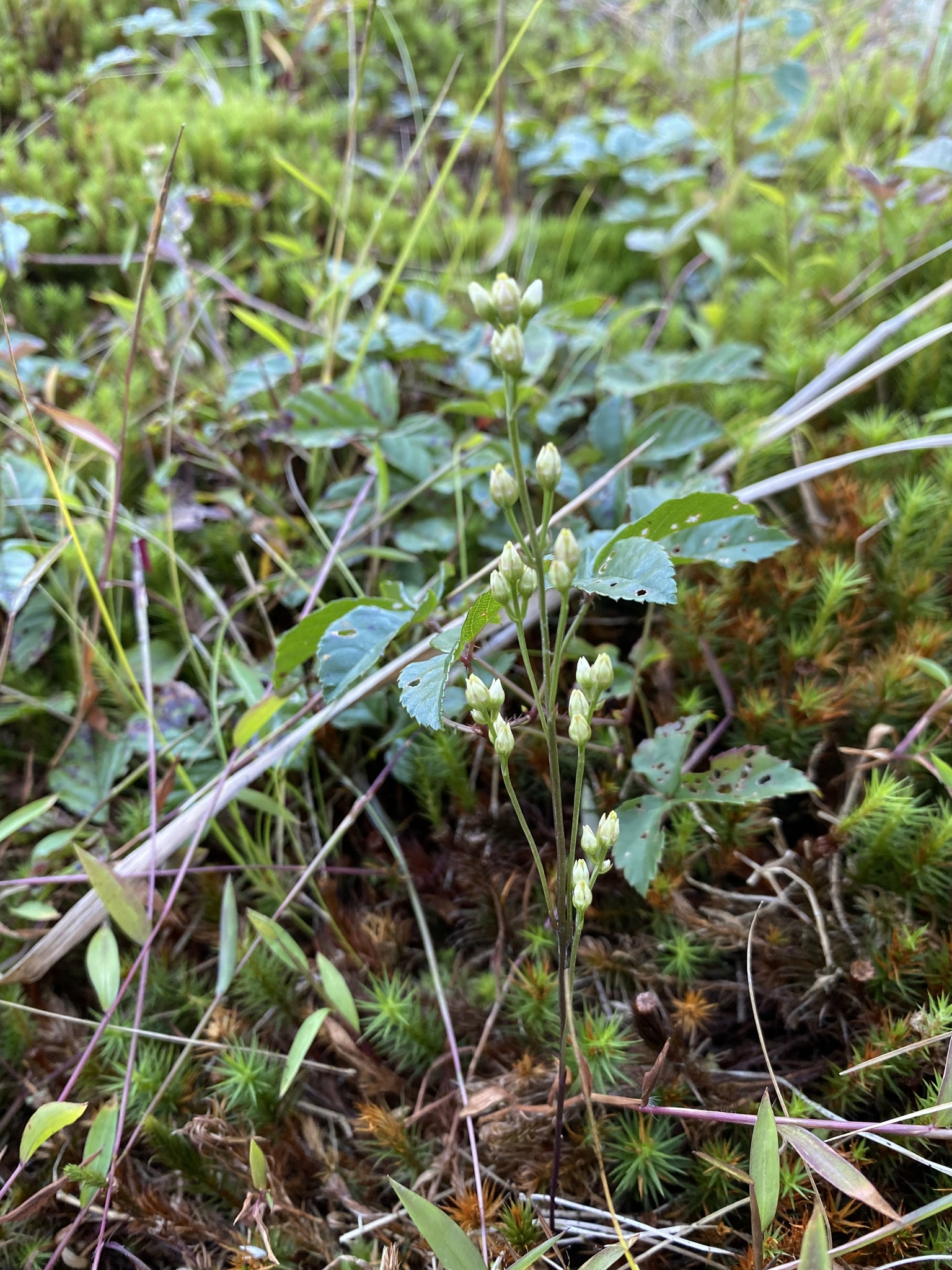

Conservation status
- Secure (NatureServe)

Scientific classification
- Kingdom: Plantae
- Clade: Tracheophytes
- Clade: Angiosperms
- Clade: Eudicots
- Clade: Asterids
- Order: Gentianales
- Family: Gentianaceae
- Genus: Bartonia
- Species: B. paniculata

Binomial name
- Bartonia paniculata (Michx.) Muhl.

Subspecies
- B. paniculata subsp. iodandra; B. paniculata subsp. paniculata; B. paniculata subsp. texana

= Bartonia paniculata =

Species of plant

Bartonia paniculata, commonly known as twining screwstem, is a saprophytic, annual or biennial species that grows in acidic, sandy-peaty wetlands.

== Distribution ==
Bartonia paniculata is the northernmost-ranging species in the genus Bartonia. It is found along the Atlantic coastal plain; its widespread range crosses 29 American states and five Canadian provinces, and overlaps with that of Bartonia virginica. The subspecies texana is found in eastern Texas and northeastern Louisiana; it was previously identified as Bartonia texana.

== Conservation ==
Twining screwstem is legally protected in the state of Michigan as a threatened species.

Populations of the subspecies texana have declined by 50% over the past 57 years. It is found within the baygalls of the coastal plain forests of southeastern Texas. As the baygalls have become rarer as a plant community, the texana subpopulation has also declined.
