= Harpanthus =

Scientific classification
- Kingdom: Plantae
- Division: Marchantiophyta
- Class: Jungermanniopsida
- Order: Jungermanniales
- Family: Harpanthaceae
- Genus: Harpanthus; Nees

Genus of liverworts

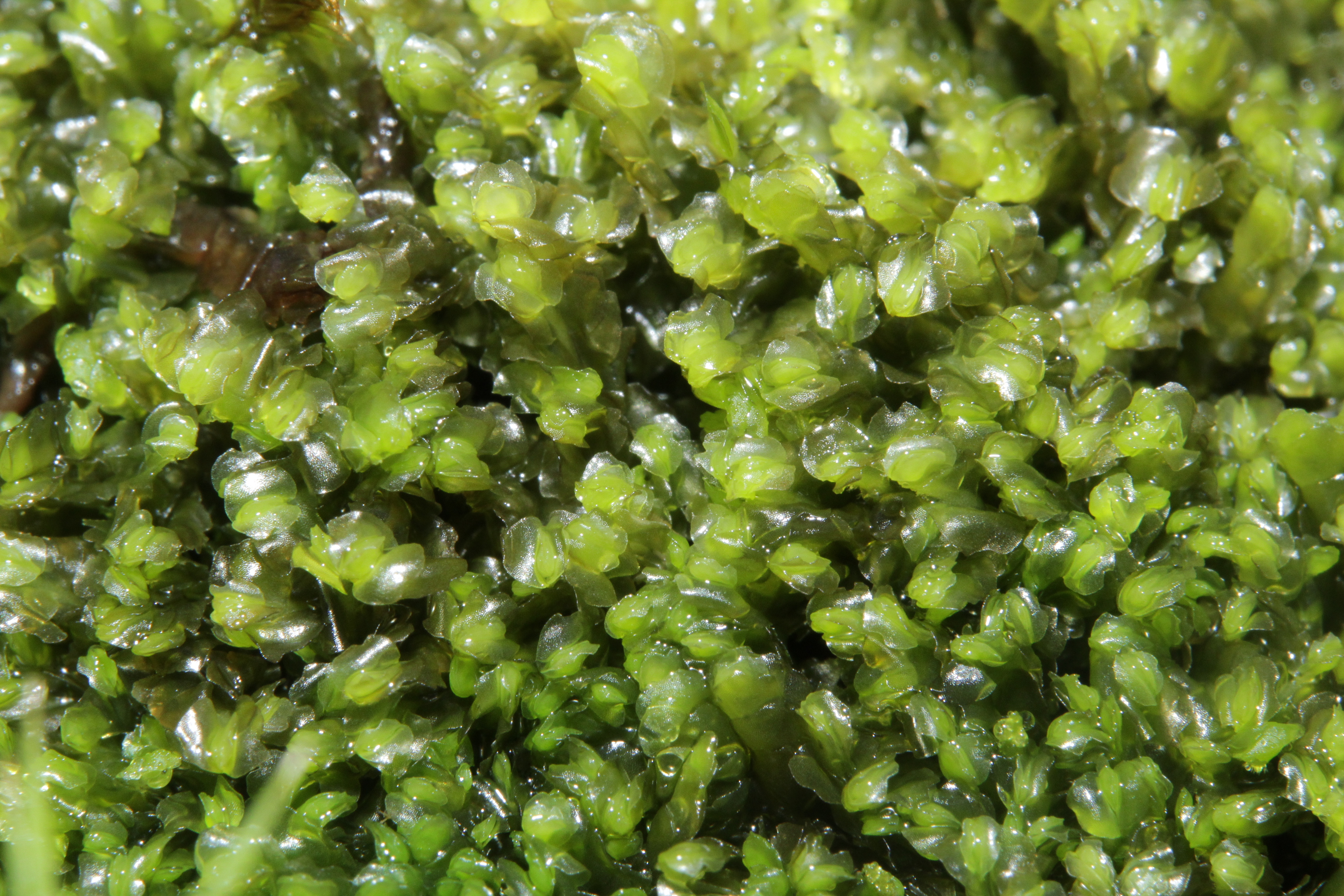
Harpanthus flotovianus

Harpanthus is a genus of liverworts belonging to the family Geocalycaceae.

The genus was first described by Christian Gottfried Daniel Nees von Esenbeck in 1836.

Species:

- Harpanthus drummondii (Taylor) Grolle
- Harpanthus flotovianus (Nees) Nees
- Harpanthus scutatus (F. Weber & D. Mohr) Spruce
