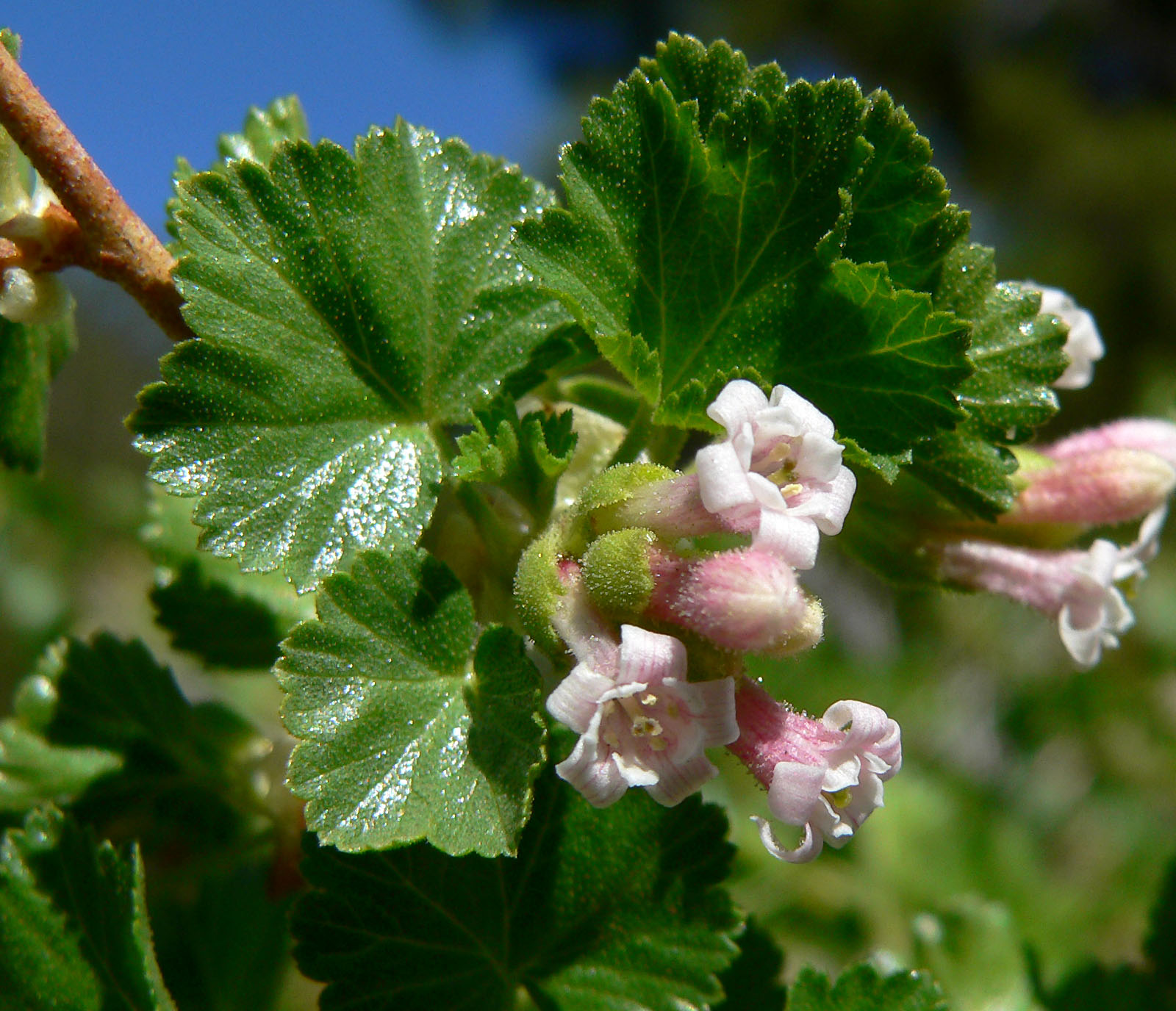
- Ribes cereum var. cereum, from the Spring Mountains, southern Nevada

Conservation status
- Secure (NatureServe)

Scientific classification
- Kingdom: Plantae
- Clade: Tracheophytes
- Clade: Angiosperms
- Clade: Eudicots
- Order: Saxifragales
- Family: Grossulariaceae
- Genus: Ribes
- Species: R. cereum

Binomial name
- Ribes cereum Douglas, 1830

Varieties
- Ribes cereum var. cereum; Ribes cereum var. colubrinum C.L.Hitchc.

Synonyms
- Cerophyllum douglasii Spach (1838)

= Ribes cereum =

Wax currant

North American species of currant

Ribes cereum is a species of currant known by the common names wax currant and squaw currant; the pedicellare variety is known as whisky currant. The species is native to western North America.

== Description ==
Ribes cereum is a spreading or erect shrub growing between 20 centimetres (8 inches) and 2 metres (6 1/2 feet) in height. The stems are fuzzy, often very glandular, and lack spines and prickles. The gray-green leaves are 1.5–2.5 centimetres (1/2–1 in) long, somewhat rounded and divided into 3–5 shallow lobes which are toothed along the edges. The leaves are hairless to quite hairy and usually studded with visible resin glands, particularly around the edges.

The inflorescence is a clustered raceme of 2 to 9 flowers. The small flower is tubular with the white to pink sepals curling open at the tips to form a corolla-like structure. Inside there are minute white or pinkish petals, five stamens, and two protruding green styles. The fruit is a rather tasteless orange-red berry up to 1 cm (3/8 in) wide, with a characteristically long, dried flower remnant at the end.

The plant is aromatic, with a spicy scent. The hairs on much of the plant can contribute to a carrion-like odor.

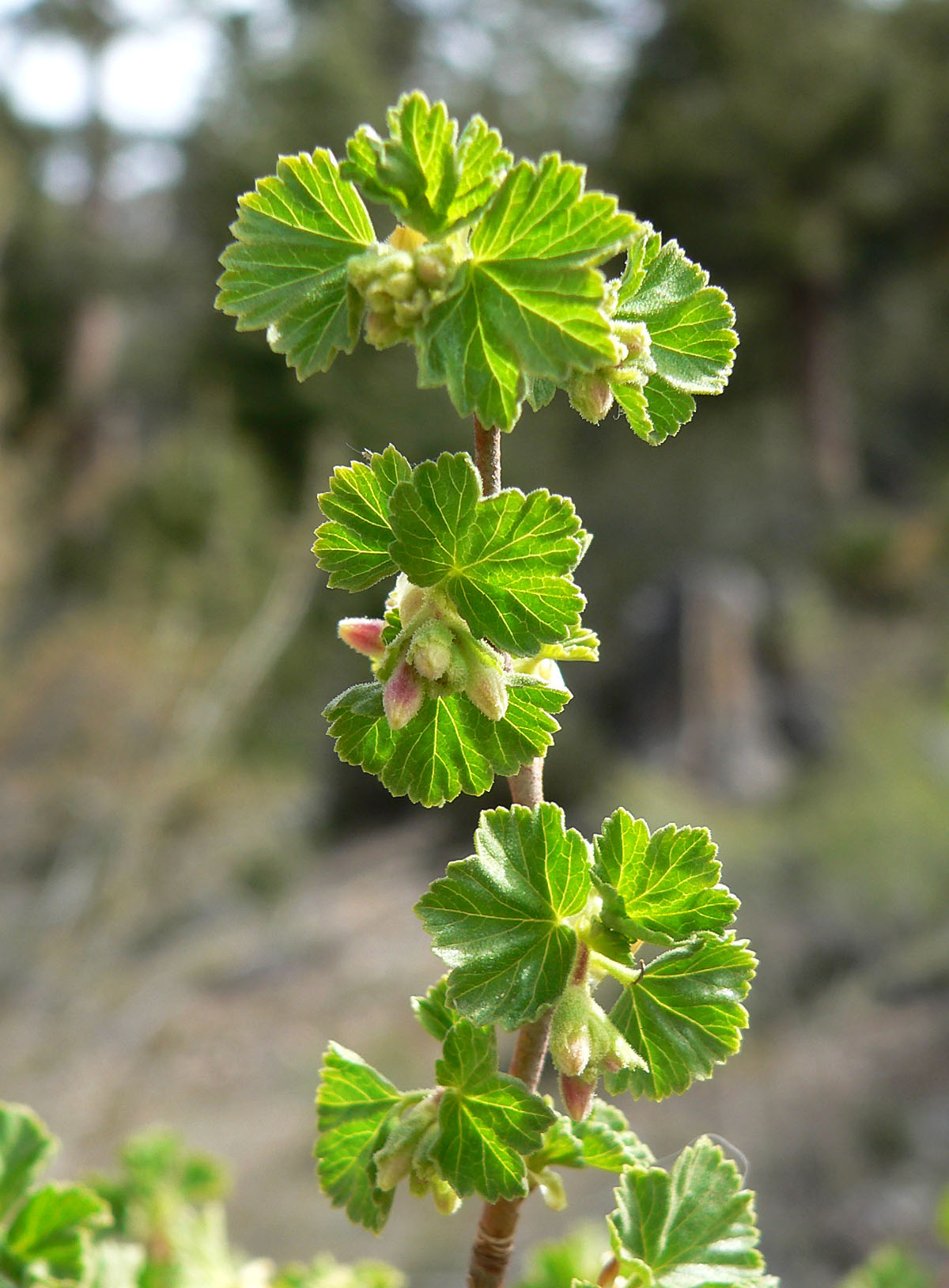
April growth in the Spring Mountains, Nevada

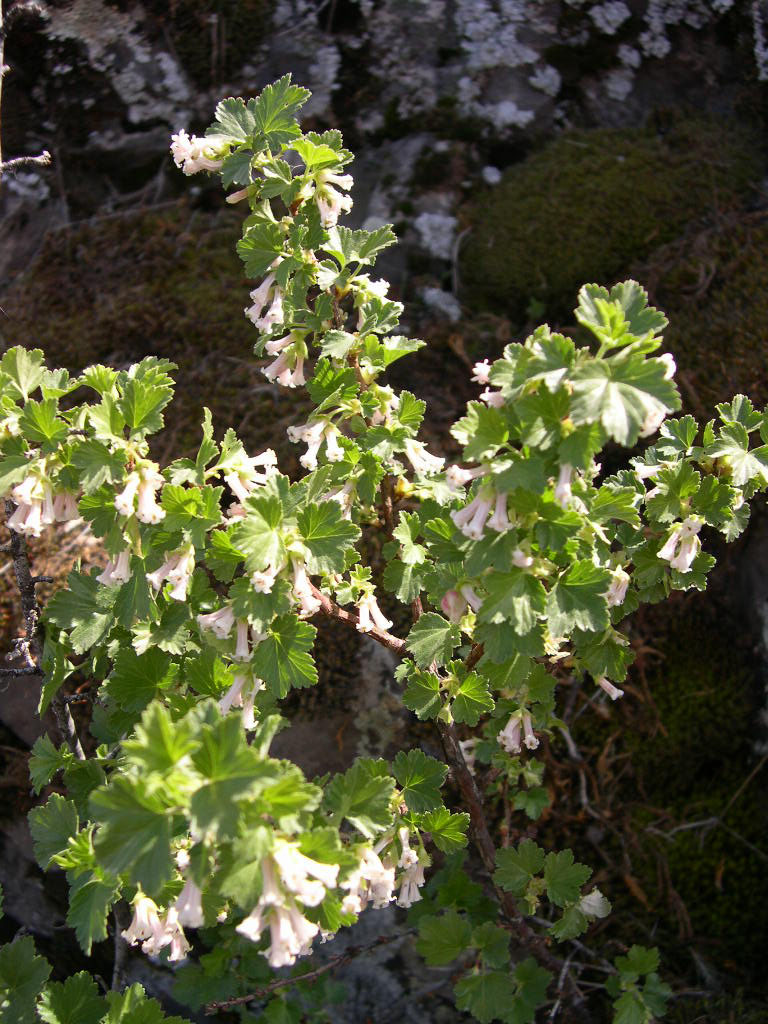
Flowering in southwest Idaho

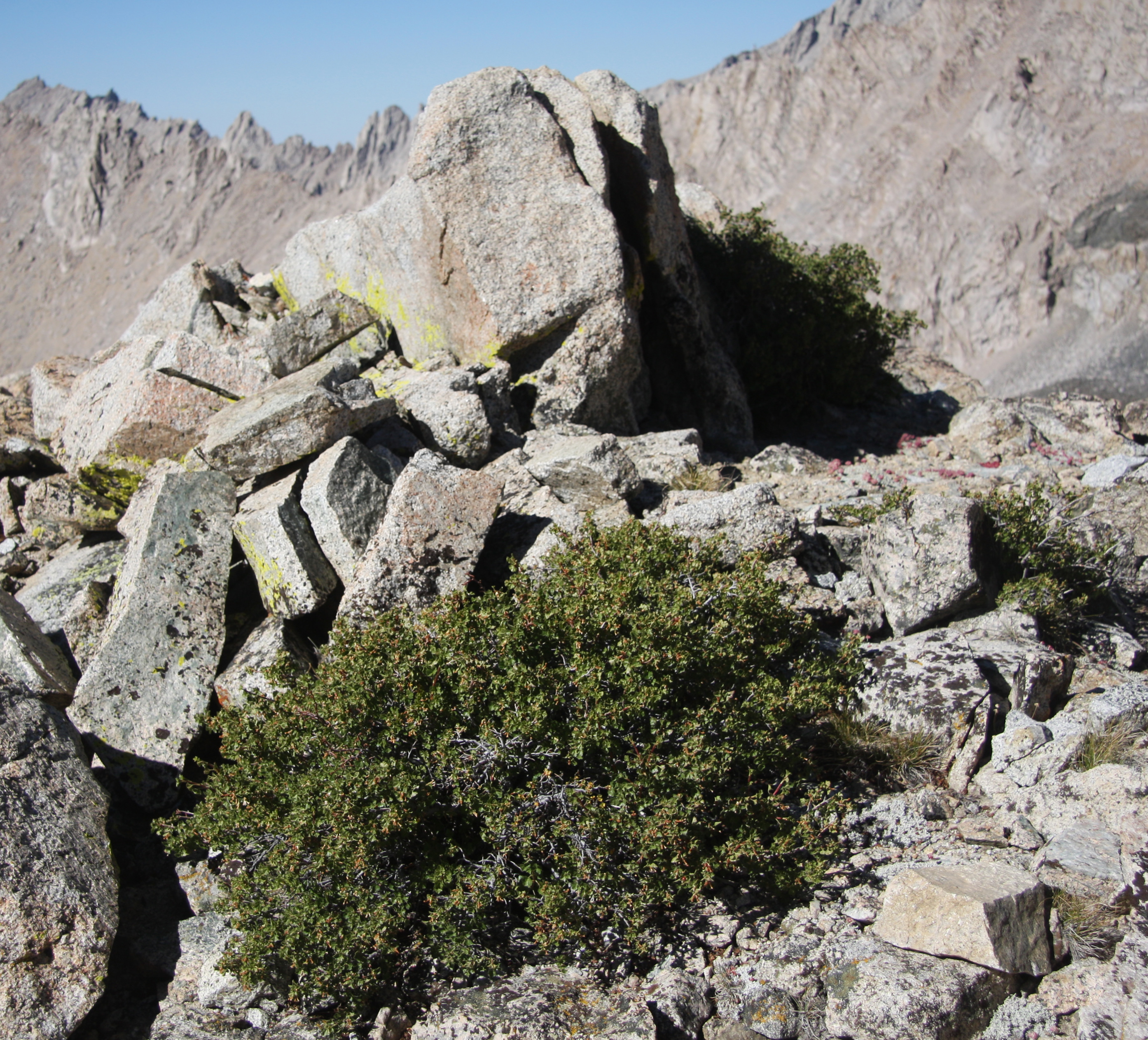
Plant at 12,500 ft (3,800 m), Sierra Nevada, California

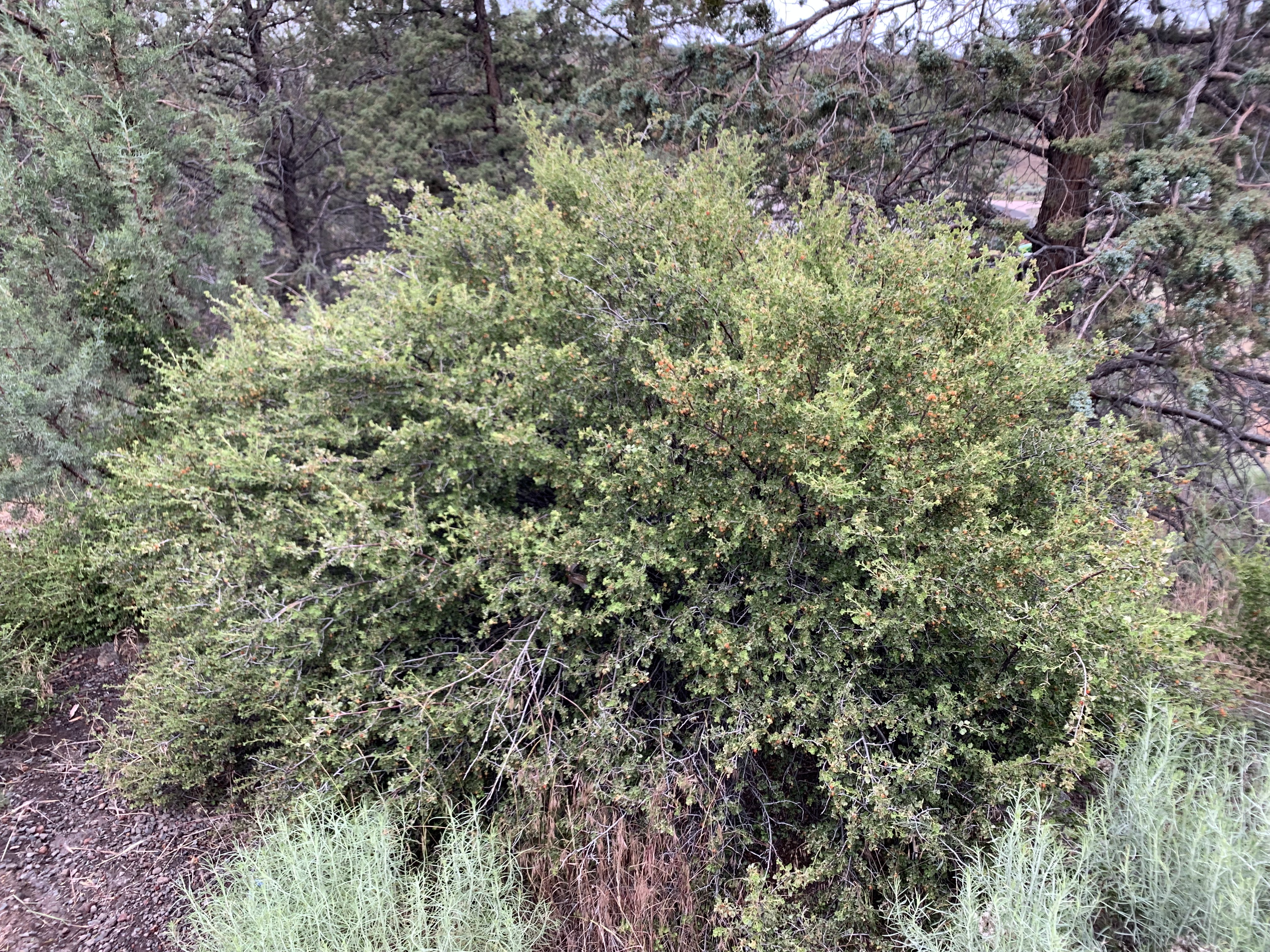
Tumalo State Park, Oregon

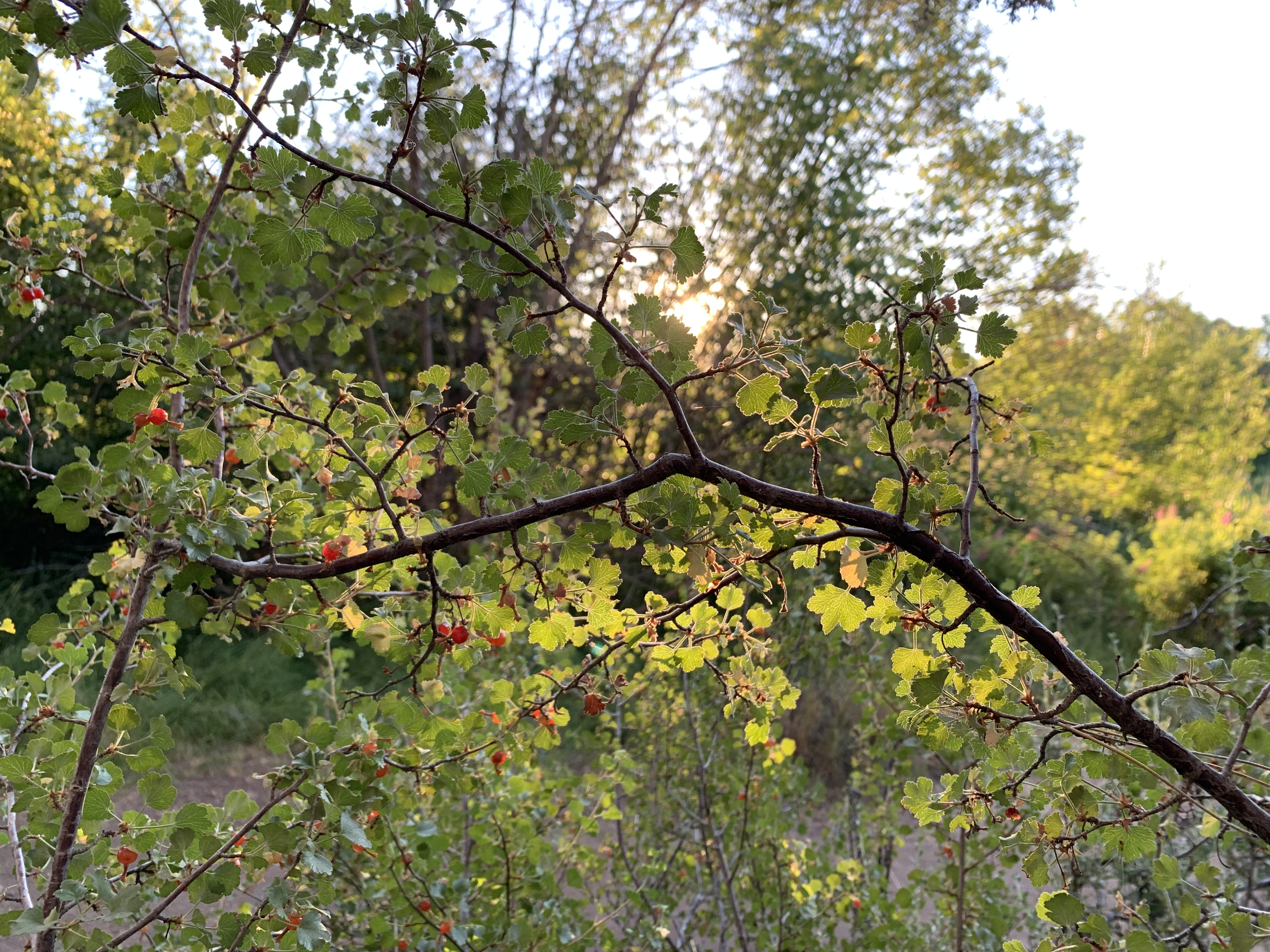
Branch in Bend, Oregon, backlit by sun

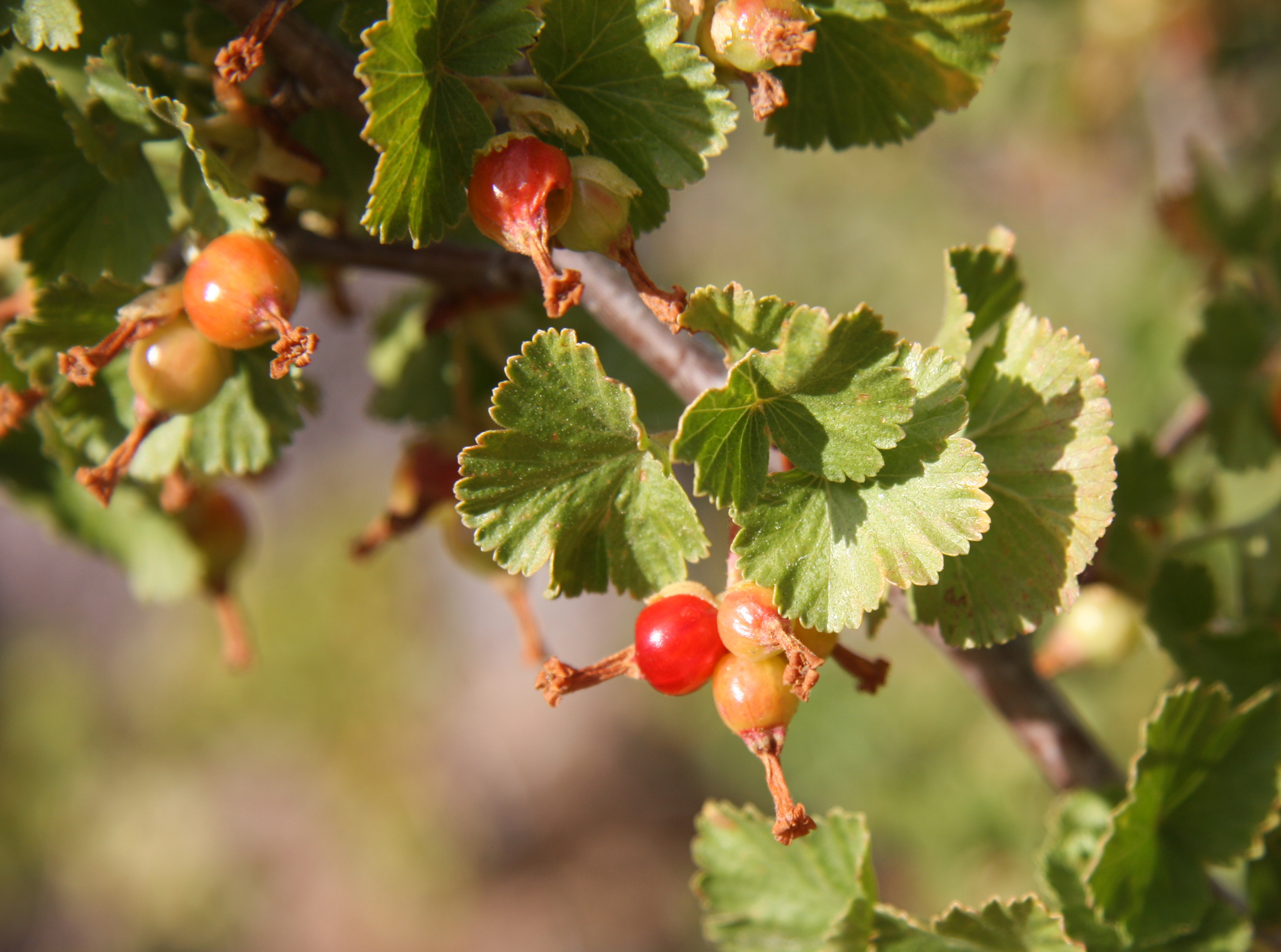
Berries with dried flower remnant

== Distribution and habitat ==
The species is native to western North America, including British Columbia, Alberta, and much of the western United States, from Washington, Oregon, and California to as far east as the western Dakotas and the Oklahoma Panhandle.

It grows in several types of habitat, including mountain forests in alpine climates, sagebrush, and woodlands. It can grow in many types of soils, including sandy soils and soil made of clay substrates, serpentine soils, and lava beds.

== Ecology ==
The berries are a significant food source for deer and are consumed by other animals.

== Uses ==
Some Native American tribes ate the berries. The Zuni people eat the berries of the pedicellare variety, as well as the leaves with uncooked mutton fat or deer fat.

One field guide reports that the berries are somewhat toxic and can have an unpleasant flavor. Eating too many may cause a burning feeling in the throat. One source says they are good when ripe, and can be made into jam or pie fillings.
