= Tumalo Creek =

River in central Oregon, U.S.

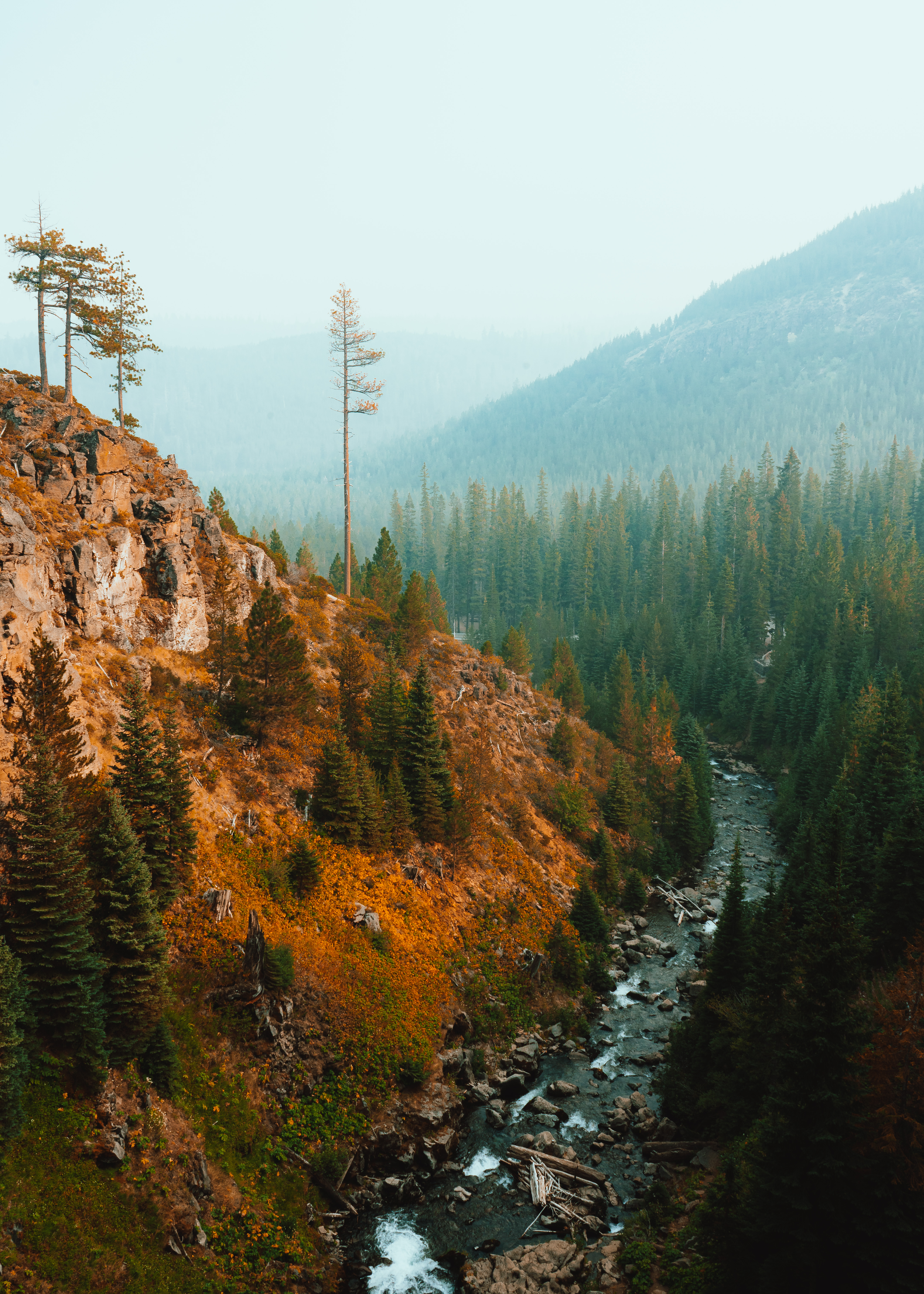
- Below Tumalo Falls

- Location of the mouth of Tumalo Creek in Oregon
- Etymology: Perhaps from the Klamath word for wild plum

Location
- Country: United States
- State: Oregon
- County: Deschutes

Physical characteristics
- Source: confluence of Middle and North forks of Tumalo Creek
  - location: Deschutes National Forest near Mount Bachelor, Cascade Range
  - coordinates: 44°02′49″N 121°35′55″W
  - elevation: 5,597 ft (1,706 m)
- Mouth: Deschutes River
  - location: north of Bend, upstream of Tumalo State Park
  - coordinates: 44°06′57″N 121°20′22″W
  - elevation: 3,245 ft (989 m)
- Length: 20 mi (32 km)
- Basin size: 59 sq mi (150 km^{2})
- Discharge
  - average: 75 cu ft/s (2.1 m^{3}/s)
  - maximum: 250 cu ft/s (7.1 m^{3}/s)

Tumalo Creek is a tributary, about 20 miles (32 km) long, of the Deschutes River, located in Deschutes County in Central Oregon, United States. It rises in the Cascade Range at 44.04706°N 121.598647°W, where Middle Fork Tumalo Creek and North Fork Tumalo Creek meet, and forms several waterfalls, including the 97-foot (30 m) Tumalo Falls. Its mouth is on the Deschutes at 44.1159506°N 121.3394783°W.

It is home to several species of trout, including the Columbia River redband trout. It is the primary drinking water source for the city of Bend. The lower reaches of the creek are often emptied for irrigation, drained by a tunnel flume at 44.09589°N 121.35966°W and Tumalo Canal at 44.09591°N 121.35970°W.

In 1883, the first known canal to be dug from the creek was created to divert water to farms. The 1979 Bridge Creek Fire and related salvage logging increased erosion and damaged habitats in and near Tumalo Creek. Since 2003, a network of government agencies and volunteer groups have been working to restore fish and wildlife habitat along a 3-mile (5 km) stretch of the stream.

== See also ==
- List of rivers of Oregon
