= Tumalo Falls =

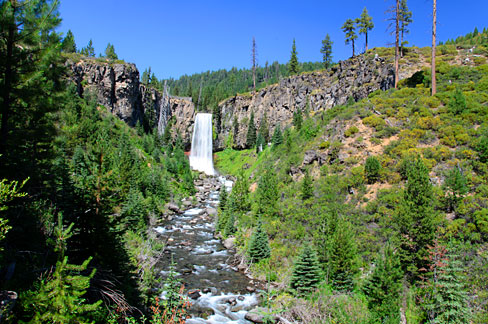
- Interactive map of Tumalo Falls
- Location: Cascade Range west of Bend in the U.S. state of Oregon
- Coordinates: 44°02′02″N 121°34′01″W
- Type: Plunge
- Elevation: 5,052 feet (1,540 m)
- Total height: 97 feet (30 m)
- Watercourse: Tumalo Creek

Tumalo Falls is a 97-foot (30 m) waterfall on Tumalo Creek, in the Cascade Range west of Bend in the U.S. state of Oregon. Additional waterfalls are upstream along Tumalo Creek and a tributary, Bridge Creek and its Bridge Creek Falls. All of these falls are within the Deschutes National Forest.

The origin of the name Tumalo is uncertain. Lewis A. McArthur's Oregon Geographic Names suggests three possible derivations from the Klamath language: temelo (wild plum), temola (ground fog), or tumallowa (icy water).

The landscape surrounding Tumalo Falls reflects millions of years of volcanism and repeated glaciation in the central Cascade Range. The Bend area has been the site of extensive volcanic activity, with basaltic andesite and other volcanic deposits dominating the regional geology. Tumalo Creek flows through a canyon carved by glacial advances and retreats during the Pleistocene era. The falls themselves drop over an overhanging lip of resistant lava flow into the glacier carved gorge below.

Tumalo Falls and the surrounding area are managed by the Deschutes National Forest as a designated day-use area. The forest road to the site is subject to seasonal closure, generally from November through May. Recreational activities include picnicking, scenic viewing, hiking, and mountain biking. Four trails originate at the trailhead: the North Fork Trail, the Bridge Creek Trail, the Tumalo Creek Trail, and the Farewell Trail. E-bikes are prohibited on all trails at the Tumalo Falls Day Use Area. On multi-use trails, hikers have the right of way over cyclists.

Tumalo Falls Trail leads from the picnic area to a viewing platform above Tumalo Falls, about 0.25 miles (0.40 km) upstream. The trail continues beyond the falls. About 1.25 miles (2.01 km) further upstream, it reaches a second waterfall, Middle Tumalo Falls, a two-tiered cascade totaling 65 feet (20 m) in height.

The site receives high visitor use and parking is limited. The day-use parking area is restricted to vehicles under 27 feet (8.2 m) in length. Access requires a day-use fee or valid recreation pass; accepted passes include the Northwest Forest Pass, the America the Beautiful Pass, and the Every Kid Outdoors Pass. Daily passes are available at the trailhead, and annual passes may be purchased at Forest Service offices and select outdoor retailers in Bend. Vault toilets are available at the day-use area; no potable water is provided. Leashed dogs are permitted on all trails except the Bridge Creek Trail, which passes through the Bend Municipal Watershed where dogs and other domestic animals are prohibited.

== See also ==
- Tumalo State Park
- List of waterfalls in Oregon
