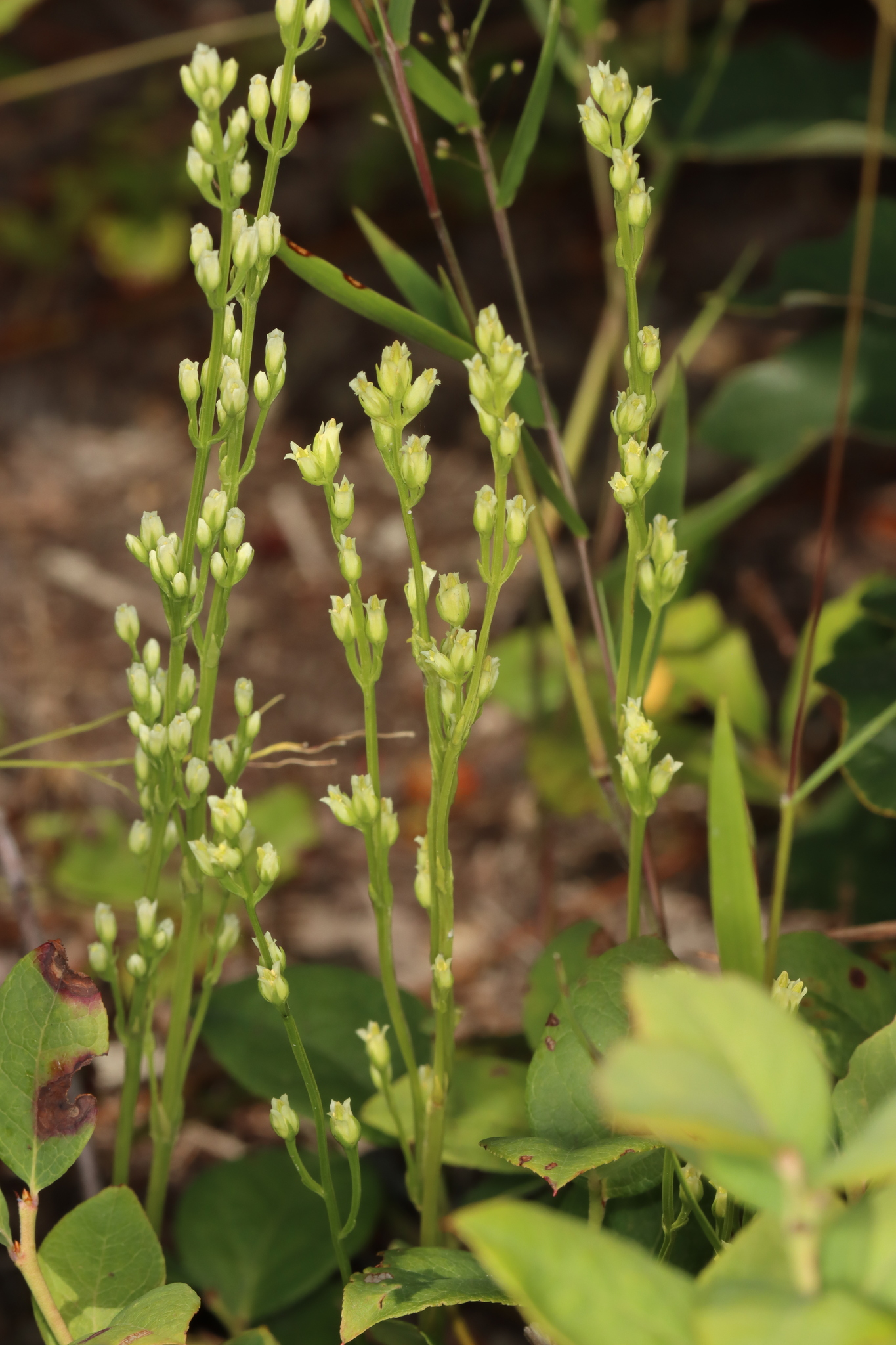

Scientific classification
- Kingdom: Plantae
- Clade: Embryophytes
- Clade: Tracheophytes
- Clade: Spermatophytes
- Clade: Angiosperms
- Clade: Eudicots
- Clade: Asterids
- Order: Gentianales
- Family: Gentianaceae
- Genus: Bartonia
- Species: B. virginica

Binomial name
- Bartonia virginica Britton, Sterns & Poggenb

Synonyms
- Alsine sagina Crantz; Andrewsia autumnalis (Pursh) Spreng.; Bartonia moseri (Steud. & Hochst. ex Griseb.) B.L.Rob. & Greenm. ex Gilg; Bartonia pentandra Barton; Bartonia tenella Muhl. ex Willd.; Bartonia virginica f. abortiva Vict.; Centaurella autumnalis Pursh; Centaurella autumnalis var. brachysepala Griseb.; Centaurella moseri Steud. & Hochst. ex Griseb.; Centaurella paniculata Michx.; Centaurium autumnale Pers.; Sagina virginica L.

= Bartonia virginica =

Species of flowering plant

Bartonia virginica, also called yellow screwstem or yellow bartonia, is a species of a flowering plant in Gentianaceae. Native to much of eastern North America, B. virginica grows in wetland habitats, especially bogs, wet meadows, and swales. It is an annual species with small pale green to yellow flowers, scale-like leaves, and reduced, hairless roots. Unlike most other species in the gentian family, B. virginica relies on underground fungal partners for many of its nutrients, a strategy known as partial mycoheterotrophy. While it is rare and threatened in some parts of its range, B. virginica is considered a globally secure species.

== Description ==
=== Morphology ===
Bartonia virginica is a small, annual plant, growing 0.4–4.5 dm tall. Its stems are erect and greenish-yellow, sometimes with purplish bases, have either round or angled cross-sections, and are often twisted, explaining the common name "screwstem." The stems may be either simple or branched. The leaves are 0.9–4.7 mm long, scale-like, and arranged oppositely on the stems or sometimes alternately near the stem bases. The leaves are more densely arranged near the bases of the stems.

The flowering period for Bartonia virginica is late summer to autumn. The flowers are arranged in upright, racemose or thyrsiform inflorescences. Each flower is 2.3–4.4 mm long and pale in color, ranging from white to greenish, yellowish, or sometimes purple-tinged. The sepals are lanceolate and 2–4.5 mm long, and the petals are oblong and 1.6–3.2 mm long, with denticulate margins and rounded or obtuse, often mucronate tips. The stamens are 1.5–3.5 mm long, bearing oblong, purple-tinged anthers. The pistil is 2.5–4.5 mm long, with a 1–2 mm long style and a decurrent stigma that runs down the side of the style.

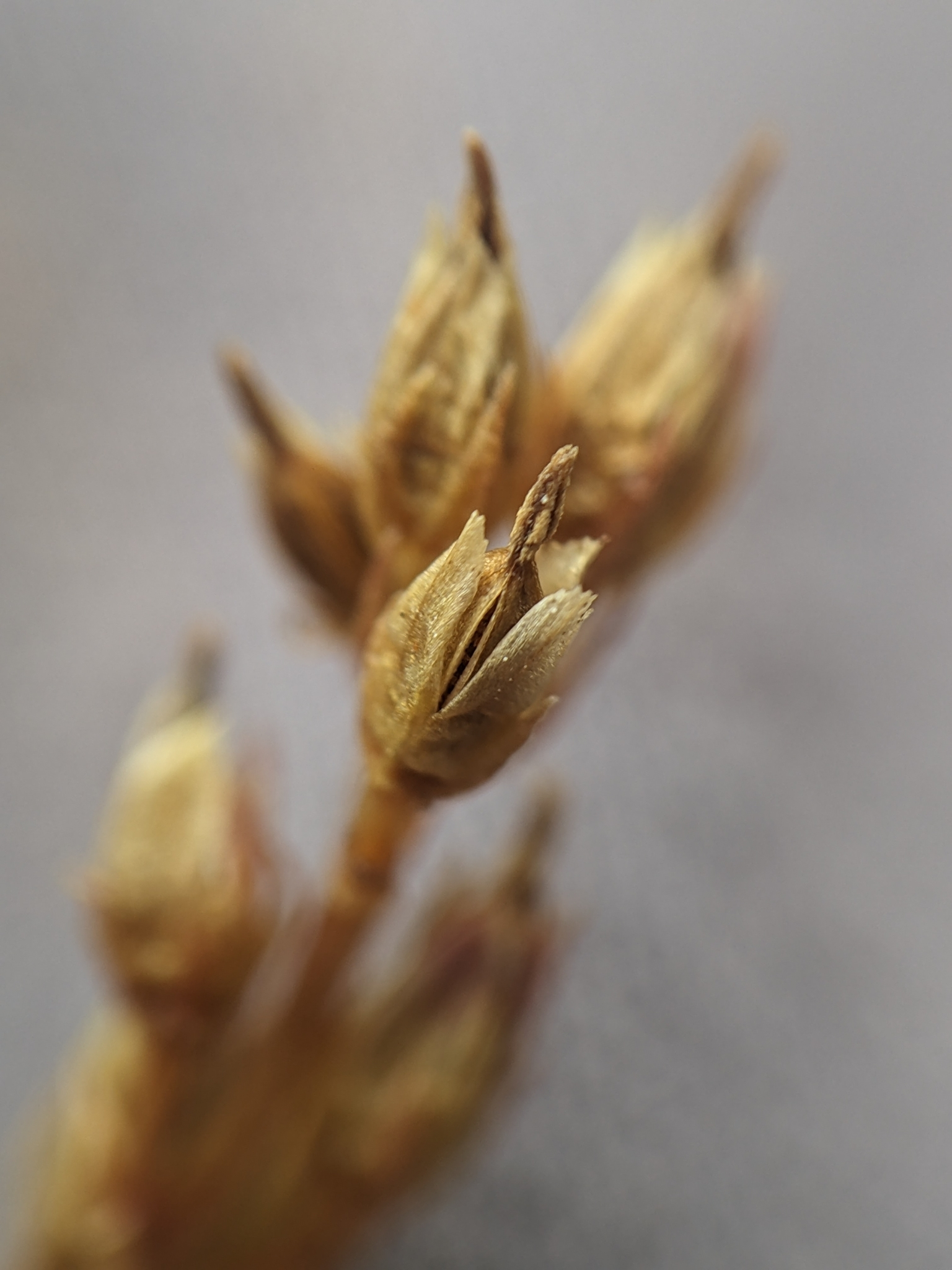
Dried Bartonia virginica fruit capsules

Fruiting occurs from August to November. Each flower produces many seeds, held in a capsule that splits open medially. The seeds are brown, irregularly shaped, and approximately 0.14 mm long and 0.08 mm wide. The diploid (2n) chromosome count is fifty-two.

=== Identification ===
Bartonia virginica, which flowers in summer to autumn, can be distinguished from B. verna, which flowers from winter to spring, by its phenology. Leaf arrangements also differ between the two species, with B. verna having more evenly-spaced cauline leaves whereas the cauline leaves of B. virginica are more concentrated near the base of the stem.

Bartonia virginica and B. paniculata are more difficult to distinguish, and some individuals have been reported as intermediates or possibly hybrids between the two taxa. Leaf arrangements again differ between the two species, with B. virginica having opposite leaves and B. paniculata having alternate leaves. Floral morphology also separates the species, with B. virginica petals having irregularly toothed edges and sharp, spine-like tips called mucros while B. paniculata petals have smooth edges and lack mucros.

== Distribution and habitat ==
Bartonia virginica is native to eastern North America, including all states and provinces to the east of the Mississippi River as well as Minnesota, Missouri, and Louisiana. In 2024, a small population was also discovered in Tyler County, Texas. Its distribution is centered around the Atlantic coastal plain, with scattered inland populations, at elevations from 0–500 m. B. virginica grows in sphagnum bogs and wet meadows, where it is found in acid bogs with sphagnum or Polytrichum mosses. In the southeastern parts of its range, B. virginica also grows in pocosins and dune swale wetlands.

== Ecology ==
Bartonia virginica is partially mycoheterotrophic, meaning that it photosynthesizes to produce some of its own carbon while also depending on underground fungi for a significant share of its carbon. This partial dependence on fungal partners compensates for the lower photosynthetic capacity of B. virginica's small leaves, reduced root system, and absence of root hairs. However, unlike some other partial mycoheterotrophs, the concentration of chlorophyll in B. virginica stems and leaves is comparable to that of autotrophic plants that produce all of their own carbon. While most members of Gentianaceae are autotrophic, Obolaria virginica is also partially mycoheterotrophic, suggesting that mycoheterotrophy may have evolved multiple times independently in the gentian family.

== Conservation ==
Globally, Bartonia virginica is considered secure, although it is considered rare or threatened in many parts of its range. At the eastern and western extremes of its distribution, B. virginica is listed as critically imperiled or endangered in Minnesota, Missouri, Newfoundland, and New Brunswick. Threats in Minnesota, where populations of B. virginica are limited to white cedar swamps and peat bogs in Goodhue and Anoka Counties, include small population sizes and vulnerability to hydrological changes. B. virginica is also considered imperiled in Ontario, owing to its rarity there, Quebec, Vermont, and Kentucky, and it is considered vulnerable in South Carolina and Nova Scotia.

== Taxonomy ==
Carl Linnaeus formally described Bartonia virginica in 1753 from a type specimen collected in Virginia by John Clayton, using the name Sagina virginica. Over the next century, in what M. L. Fernald and C. A. Weatherby described as a "comedy of errors," various authors published other names for this genus, including Andrewsia (by Sprengel), Bartonia (by Muhlenberg), Centaurella (by Michaux), and Centaurium (by Persoon), resulting in a large number of taxonomic synonyms. Ultimately, the name Bartonia virginica prevailed, despite the earlier publication of the name Sagina virginica.

Currently, modern treatments of Bartonia recognize three species, following a 2009 phylogenetic analysis of the genus that used genetic and morphological data to clarify species boundaries. Although taxonomists had previously questioned whether B. virginica and B. paniculata were distinct species given their morphological, phenological, and chromosomal similarities and the existence of putative hybrids, genetic data revealed that B. virginica is more closely related to B. verna than to B. paniculata.
