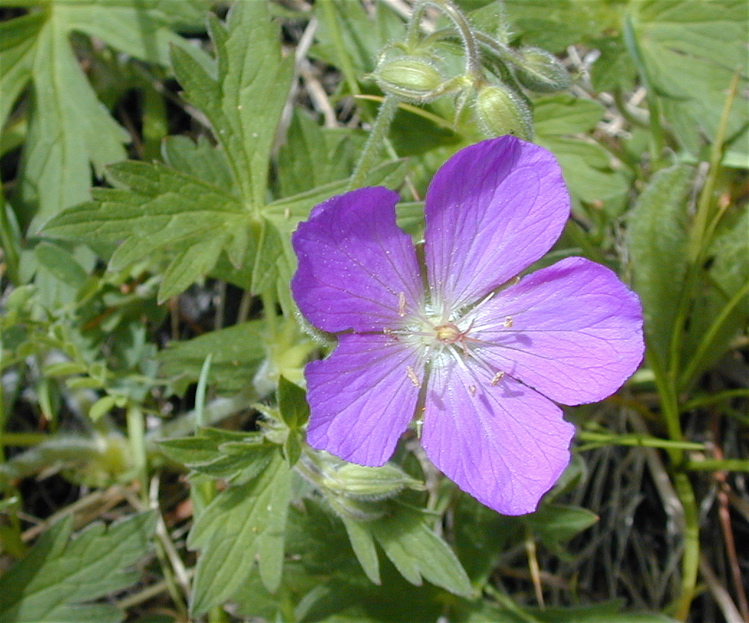

Scientific classification
- Kingdom: Plantae
- Clade: Tracheophytes
- Clade: Angiosperms
- Clade: Eudicots
- Clade: Rosids
- Order: Geraniales
- Family: Geraniaceae
- Genus: Geranium
- Species: G. oreganum

Binomial name
- Geranium oreganum Howell

= Geranium oreganum =

Species of flowering plant

Geranium oreganum is a species of geranium known by the common name Oregon cranesbill, or Oregon geranium. It is native to western North America from California to Alberta, where it grows in mountain forests and meadows. This is a perennial herb growing generally erect to heights of 40 to 80 centimeters. The slender stems have a foliage of large palmate leaves up to 15 centimeters wide and divided into several segments, each of which is subdivided into rounded or pointed lobes. The flower has pointed sepals beneath rounded lavender to purple petals. The fruit has a small body with a pointed style column up to five centimeters long.
