= Harpanthus scutatus =

Scientific classification
- Kingdom: Plantae
- Division: Marchantiophyta
- Class: Jungermanniopsida
- Order: Jungermanniales
- Family: Harpanthaceae
- Genus: Harpanthus
- Species: H. scutatus

Binomial name
- Harpanthus scutatus (F.Weber & D.Mohr) Spruce, 1850

Species of liverwort

Harpanthus scutatus is a species of liverworts belonging to the family Geocalycaceae.

It is native to Eurasia and Northern America.
