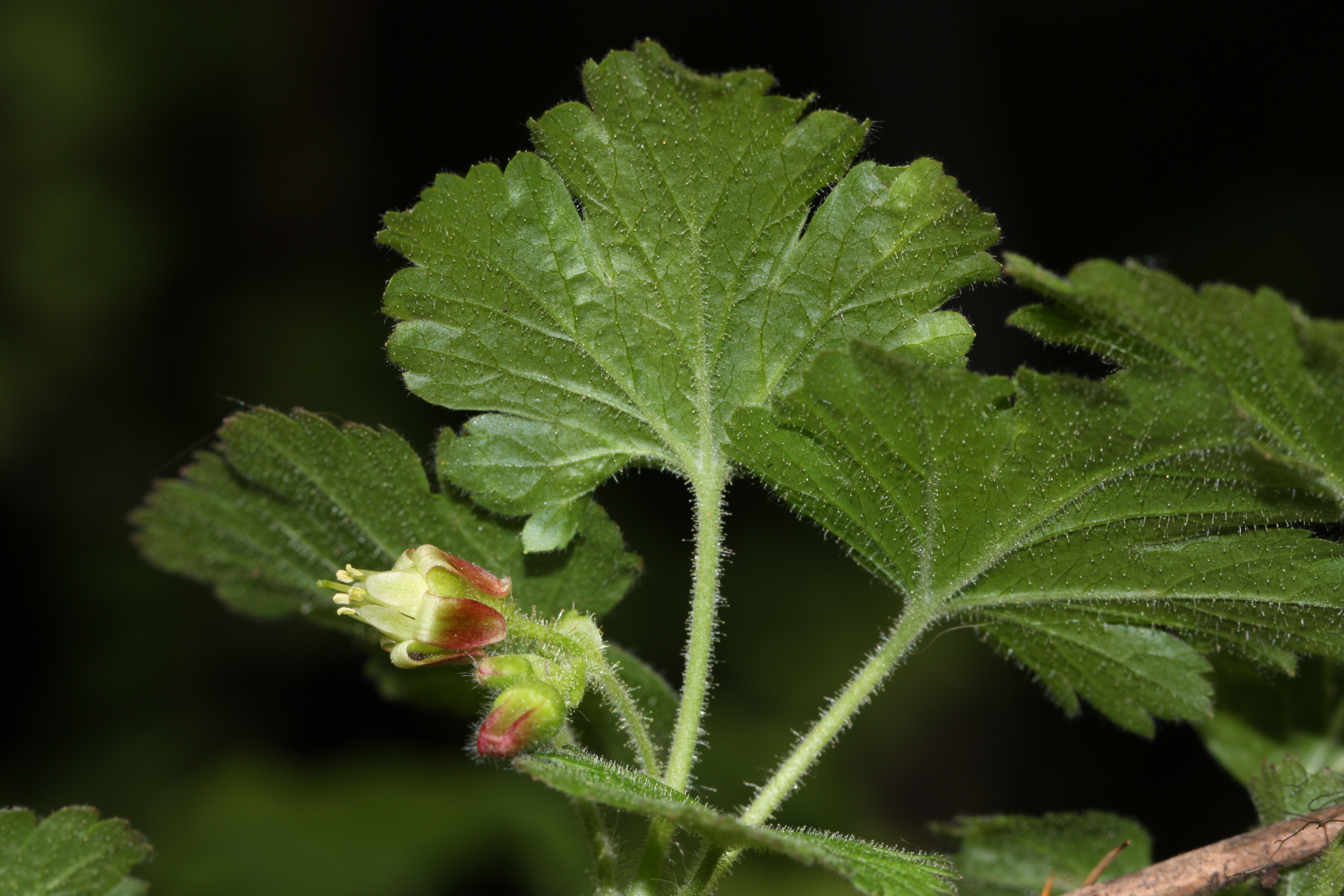

Scientific classification
- Kingdom: Plantae
- Clade: Tracheophytes
- Clade: Angiosperms
- Clade: Eudicots
- Order: Saxifragales
- Family: Grossulariaceae
- Genus: Ribes
- Species: R. watsonianum

Binomial name
- Ribes watsonianum Koehne 1893

Synonyms
- Grossularia watsoniana (Koehne) Coville & Britton

= Ribes watsonianum =

Species of flowering plant

Ribes watsonianum is a North American species of currant known by the common names spring gooseberry and wild gooseberry, found in the US states of Washington and Oregon.

== Description ==
There are 1–3 spines at the leaf nodes. The leaves are 2.5–5 centimetres (1–2 in) wide, with 3–5 rounded lobes.

The dangling, bell-shaped flowers grow singly or in clusters of 2–3. The sepals are greenish to whitish and pink, while the petals are white to light pink.

The unpalatable, bristled berry is greenish to orangish.

== Distribution and habitat ==
It is found in the US states of Washington and Oregon, in forests and meadows, on slopes and mountains.

== Ecology ==
The plant is shade tolerant. The berry is consumed by wildlife.
