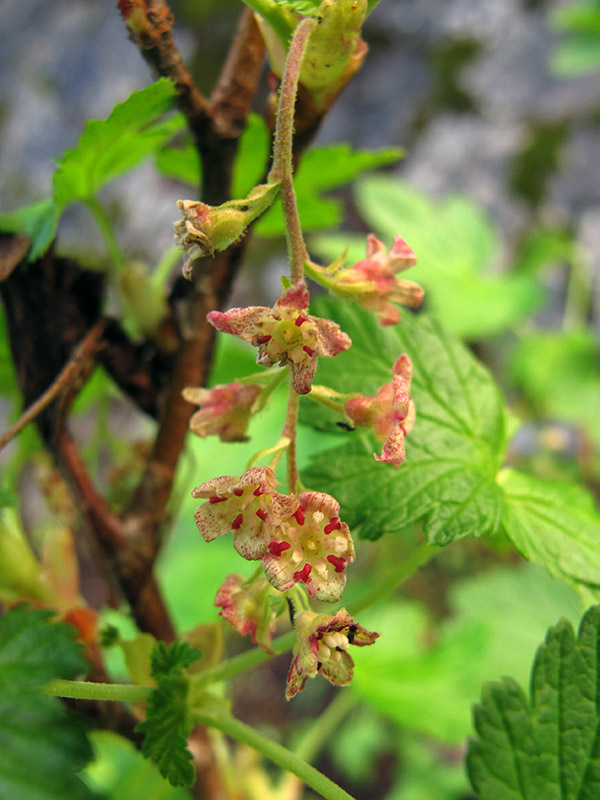

Scientific classification
- Kingdom: Plantae
- Clade: Tracheophytes
- Clade: Angiosperms
- Clade: Eudicots
- Order: Saxifragales
- Family: Grossulariaceae
- Genus: Ribes
- Species: R. acerifolium

Binomial name
- Ribes acerifolium Howell 1895, not K.Koch 1869 (the latter name published without description hence not valid)

Synonyms
- Ribes howellii Greene

= Ribes acerifolium =

Species of currant

Ribes acerifolium is a North American species of currant known by the common names mapleleaf currant and maple-leaved currant. It is native to the Canadian Province of British Columbia as well as to the northwestern United States (Washington, Idaho, Oregon).

Ribes acerifolium is a trailing shrub up to 100 cm (40 inches) tall, with red or pink flowers and black berries.
