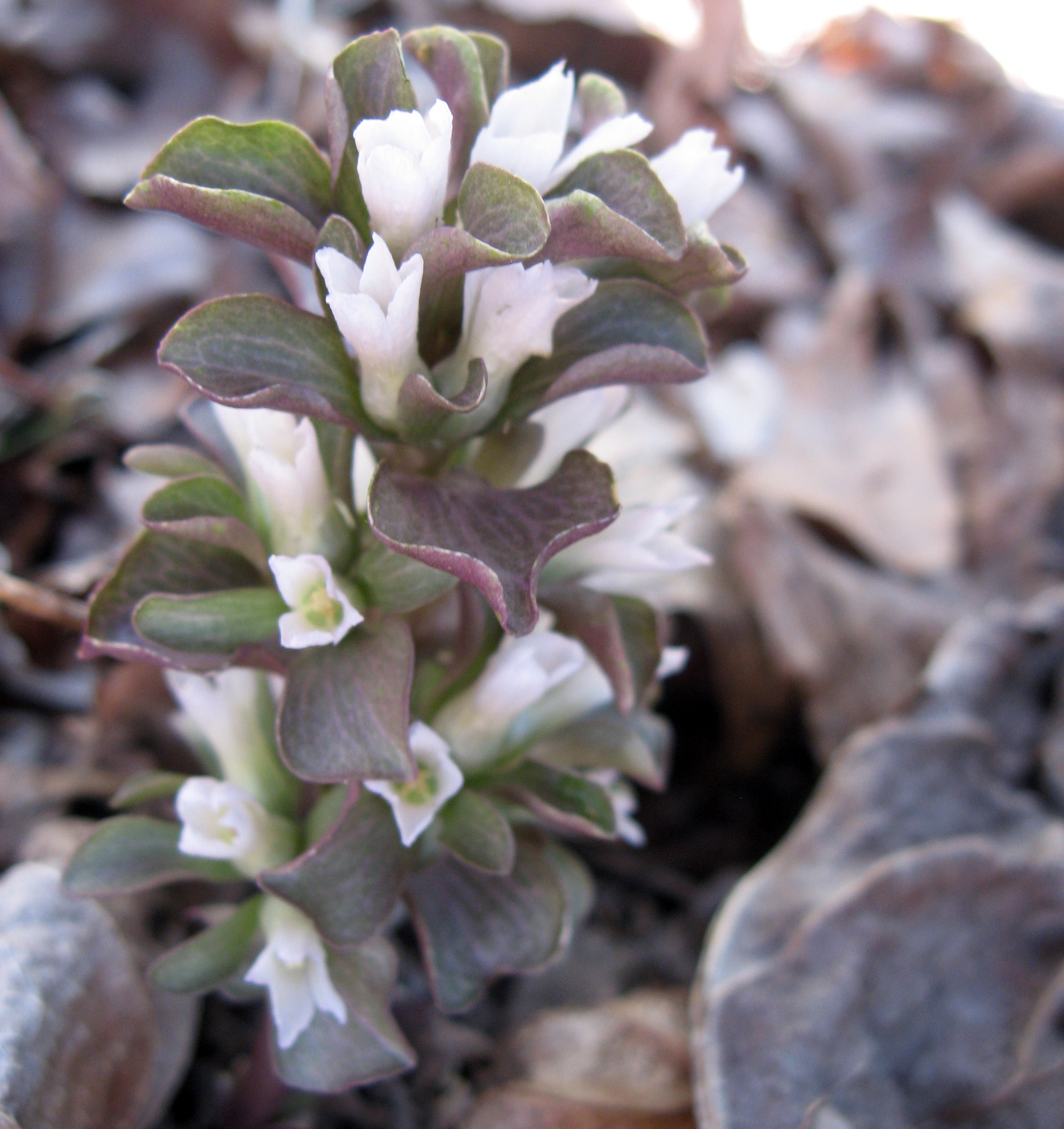

Scientific classification
- Kingdom: Plantae
- Clade: Tracheophytes
- Clade: Angiosperms
- Clade: Eudicots
- Clade: Asterids
- Order: Gentianales
- Family: Gentianaceae
- Tribe: Gentianeae
- Subtribe: Swertiinae
- Genus: Obolaria; L.
- Species: O. virginica

Binomial name
- Obolaria virginica L.

= Obolaria =

Genus of flowering plants

Obolaria is a genus of flowering plant in the gentian family Gentianaceae. It is monotypic, being represented by the single species Obolaria virginica, commonly known as Virginia pennywort.

It is native to the eastern United States, where it is found in nutrient-rich forests. It is believed to be mycoheterotrophic, getting much of its nutrients though a symbiotic relationship with fungi, instead of through its small purplish-green leaves.

It is a perennial that produces white flowers in the spring. It is often difficult to locate due to its small stature, and tendency to be buried under leaf litter.
