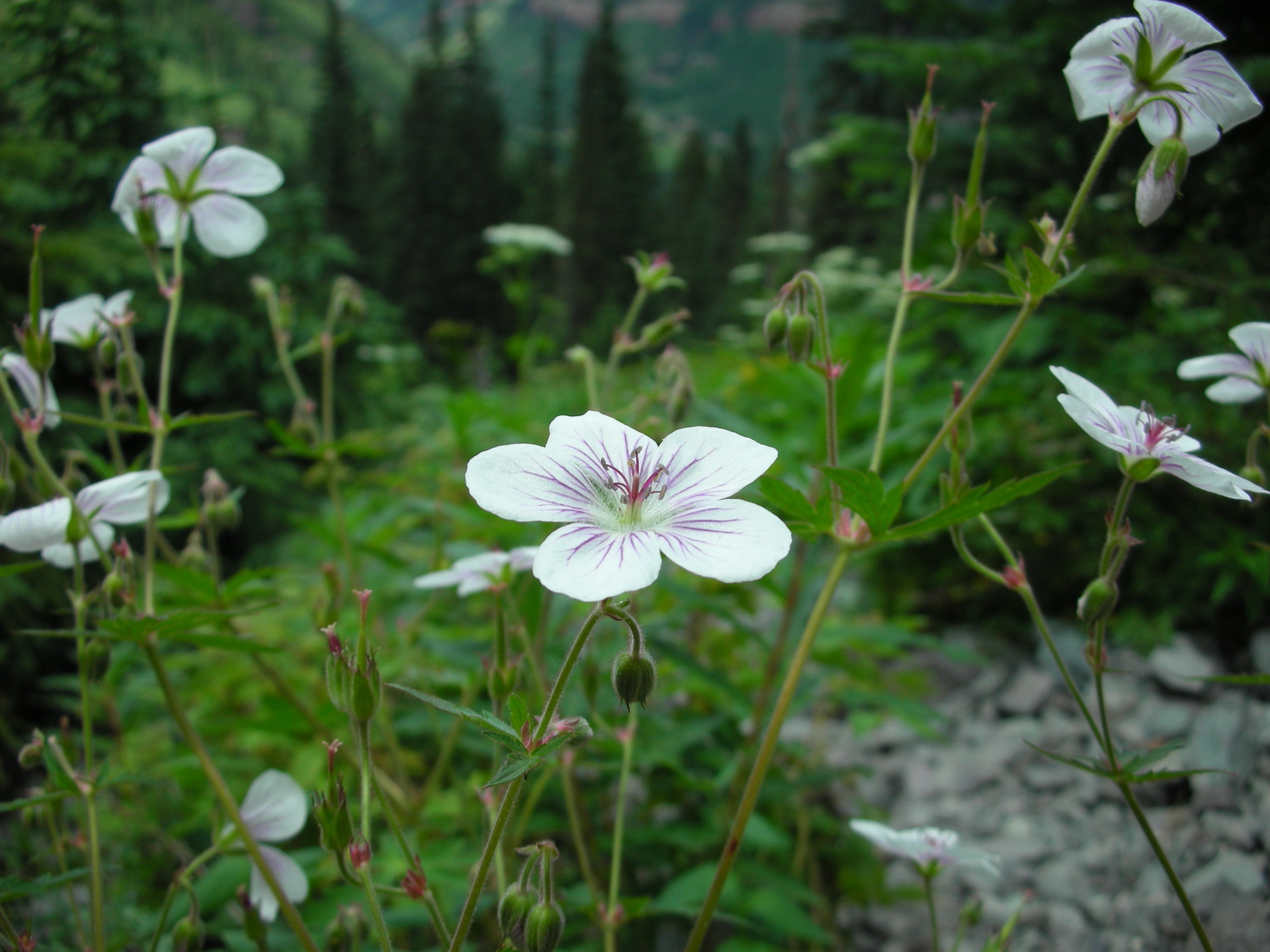

Conservation status
- Secure (NatureServe)

Scientific classification
- Kingdom: Plantae
- Clade: Tracheophytes
- Clade: Angiosperms
- Clade: Eudicots
- Clade: Rosids
- Order: Geraniales
- Family: Geraniaceae
- Genus: Geranium
- Species: G. richardsonii

Binomial name
- Geranium richardsonii Fisch. & Trautv.

= Geranium richardsonii =

Species of flowering plant

Geranium richardsonii is a species of geranium known by the common name Richardson's geranium. It is native to western North America from Alaska to New Mexico, where it can be found in a number of habitats, especially mountains and forests. This is a perennial herb varying in maximum height from 20 to 80 centimeters. The plant grows from a tough, woody taproot and older plants develop rhizomes. The leaves are up to 15 centimeters wide and are divided into generally five segments, each segment subdivided into small rounded or pointed lobes. The flower has five pointed sepals beneath five rounded petals, each one to two centimeters long. The petals are white to purple with darker purple veining. The fruit has a small body with a straight style up to 2.5 centimeters long (see image at left).

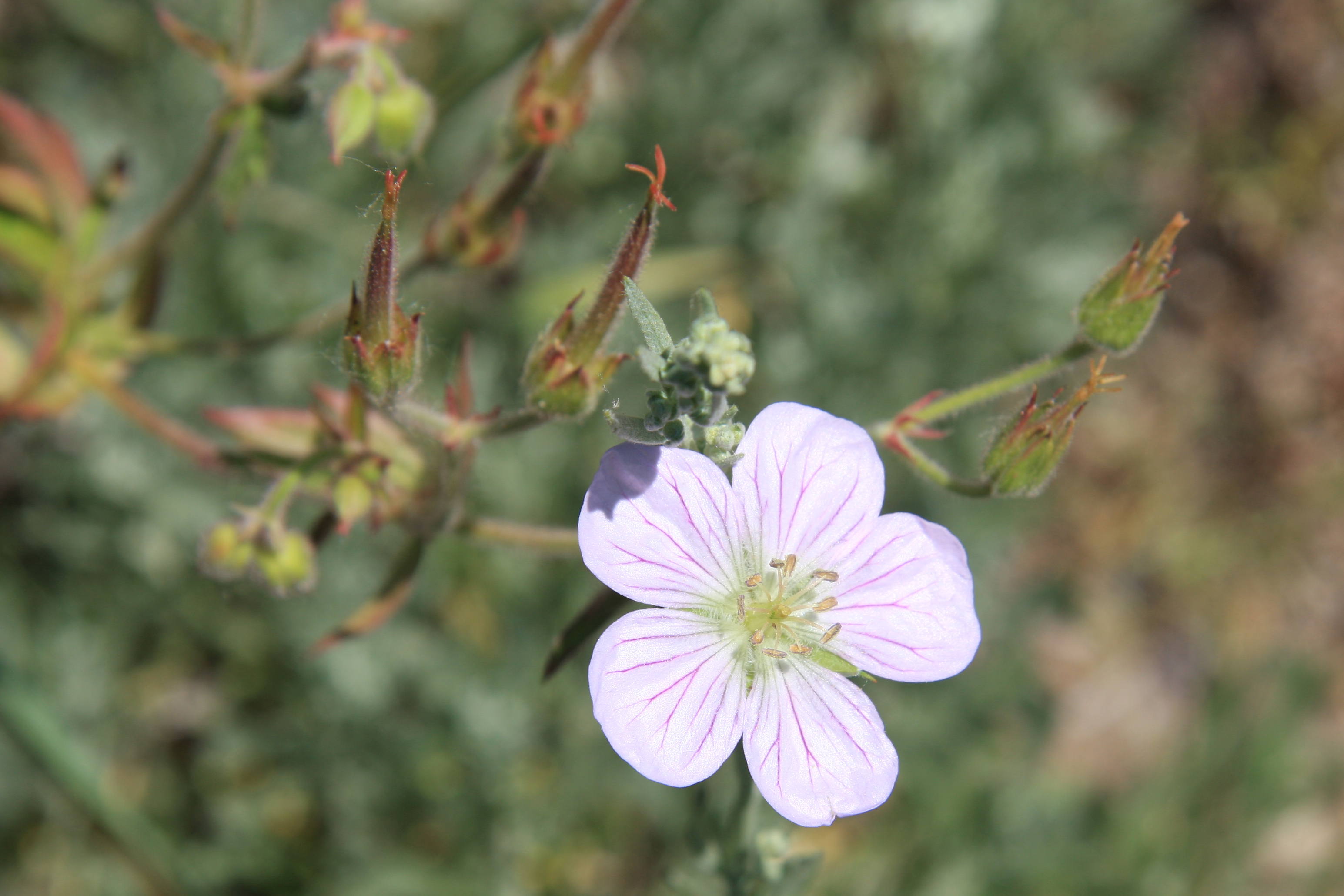
Geranium richardsonii, flower and fruits
