= Tumalo State Park =

State park in Oregon, United States

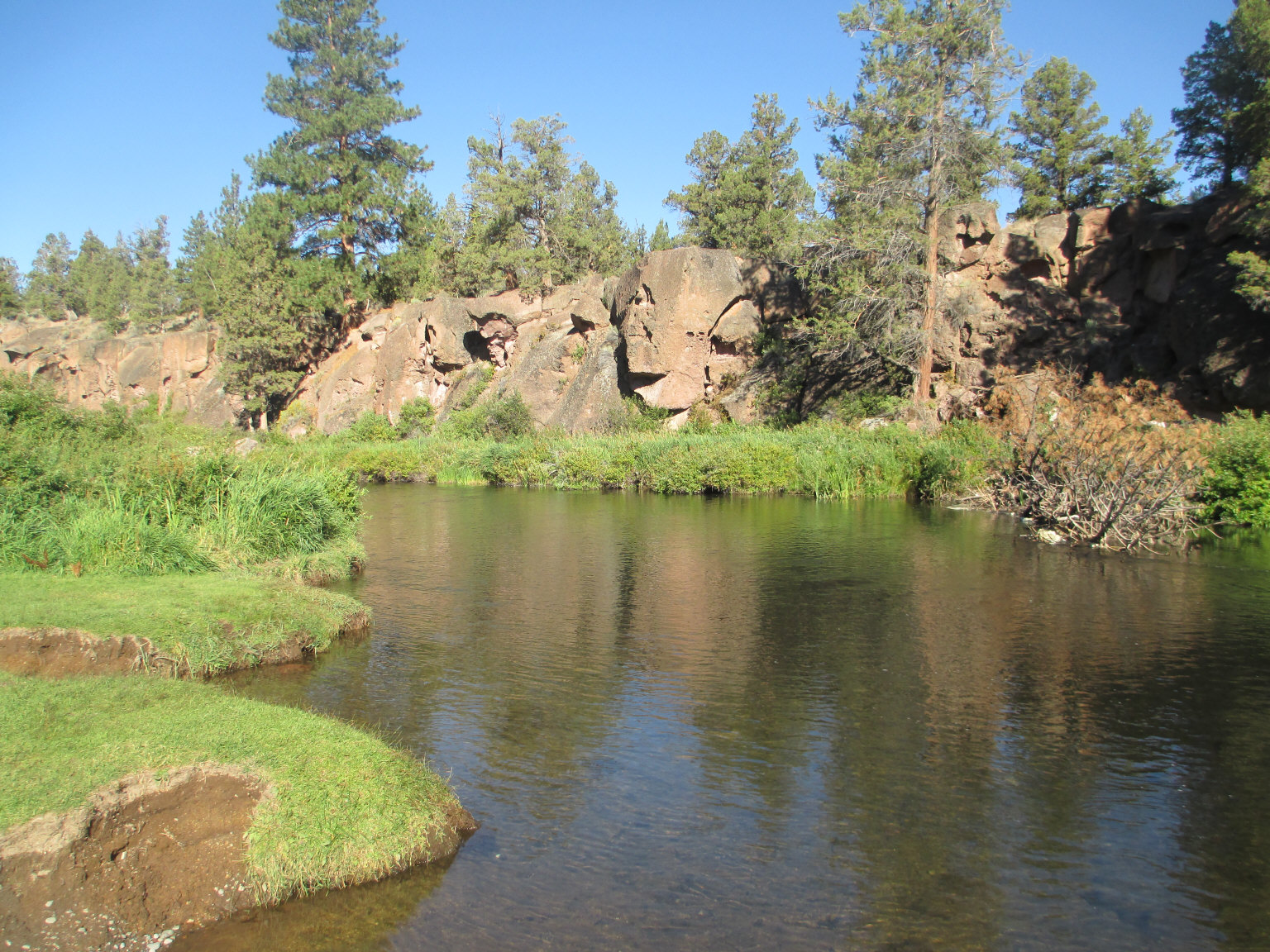
- The Deschutes River at the park

- Location within Oregon Location within the United States
- Type: Public, state
- Location: Deschutes County, Oregon
- Nearest city: Bend, Oregon
- Coordinates: 44°07′37″N 121°19′55″W
- Area: 330 acres (130 ha)
- Created: 1954
- Operator: Oregon Parks and Recreation Department

Tumalo State Park is a well-developed state park in Deschutes County, Oregon, United States. Established in 1954, the park is located northwest of the city of Bend and along the Deschutes River at a site home to many bird species. The park is popular for picnics, swimming, fishing, hiking, and camping, and is open year-round.

== History ==
Tumalo State Park was established in 1954. It is located approximately 5 miles (8.0 km) northwest of Bend. The park preserved a scenic portion of the Deschutes River where basalt cliffs extend down to the river. It also created a day-use picnic area and a public campground.

The original 115 acres (47 ha) were given to the State of Oregon by Deschutes County. Minor property adjustments have been made over the years. In 1959, the state returned 1 acre (0.40 ha) to the county for a road right of way across the southern part of park. The road connected residents living south of the park with the old highway. In 1960, the state purchased an additional 3.5 acres (1.4 ha). A year later, the state granted another road easement to the county, allowing Johnson Road to cross the western corner of the park. This reduced the park's area by 0.8 acres (0.32 ha). In 1963, a third road right of way reduced it by another 0.7 acres (0.28 ha). In 1972, the county gave an additional 191 acres (77 ha) to the state to expand the park. Additional land purchases and exchanges over the next decade brought the total park property to 330 acres (130 ha).

== Topography ==
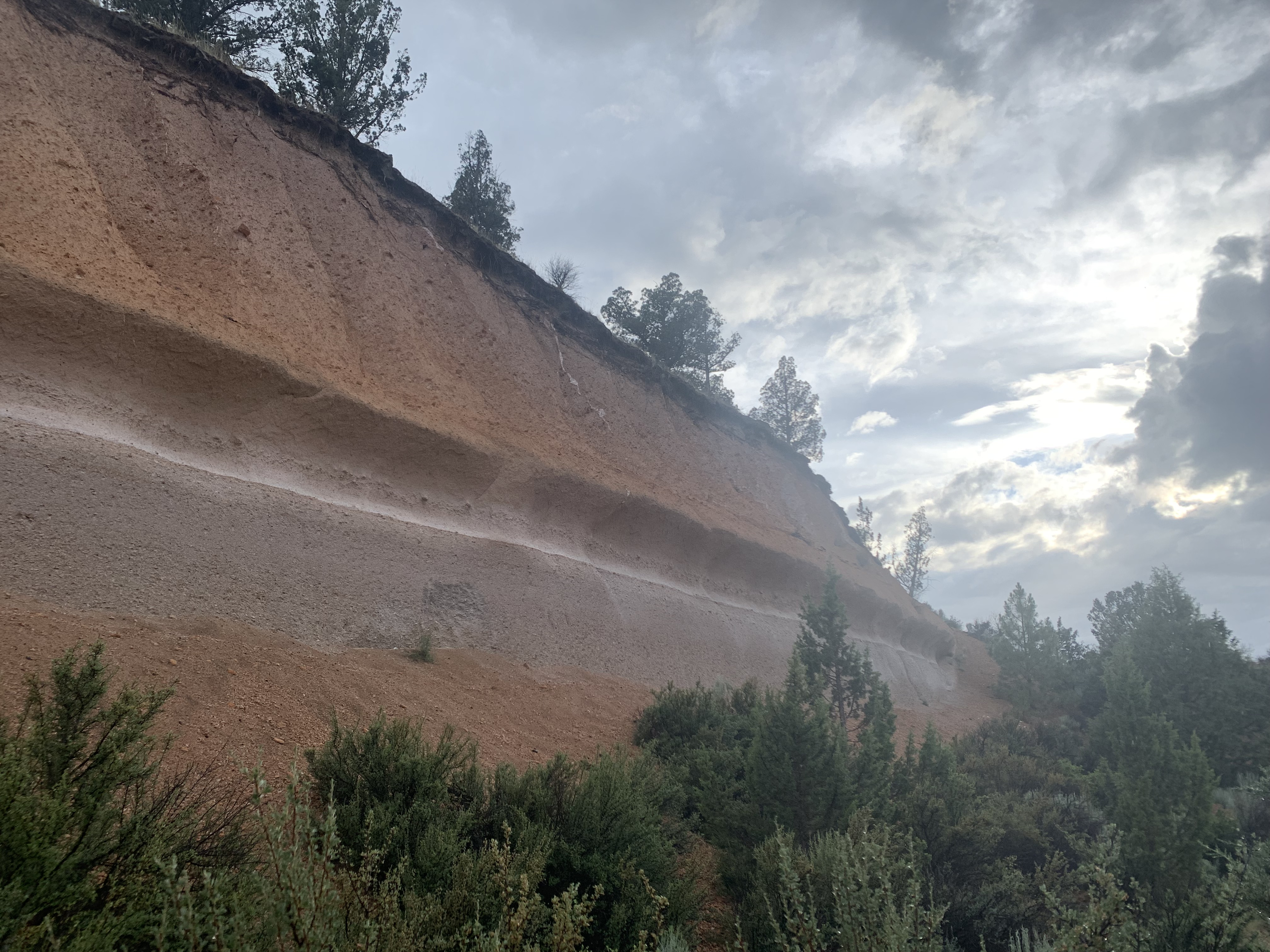
Sedimentary layers along O. B. Riley Rd on south side of park

Tumalo State Park is located in the Deschutes River canyon, running along both sides of the river. The park land on the east side of the river is mostly level with a gentle upward slope toward the east. The slope becomes much steeper at the eastern edge of the park. On the west side of the river, the park land is for the most part level.

== Ecology ==
The park landscape is generally open with a light tree cover, mainly western juniper with some ponderosa pine. In the undeveloped parts of the park, big sagebrush is the main ground cover. There are willow, dogwood, alder, and poplar along the river banks.

Tumalo State Park is a good spot for birdwatching. Swallows are common around the cliffs, and great blue herons can be seen along the river shoreline. Other common birds include the mountain chickadee, western meadowlark, Dusky flycatcher, gray flycatcher, Hammond's flycatcher, yellow warbler, Townsend's warbler, evening grosbeak, black-headed grosbeak, Cassin's finch, pygmy nuthatch, house wren, Pacific wren, hermit thrush, Townsend's solitaire, and cedar waxwing. Though not common, the American dipper, least flycatcher, black-and-white warbler, painted bunting, and Costa's hummingbird have been spotted at the park. Among the larger birds are the mourning dove, California quail, northern flicker, downy woodpecker, and hairy woodpecker. Birds of prey found in the area include the northern pygmy-owl, great horned owl, osprey, and bald eagle.

Golden-mantled ground squirrels and chipmunks are common in the park. In the early morning and evening, black-tailed deer can be seen in the park as well. California ground squirrels, western gray squirrels, pygmy rabbits, mountain cottontails, black-tailed jackrabbits, striped skunks, porcupines, raccoons, and American badgers live in the area around the park. Coyotes and bobcats are also found in the area around the park.

== Recreation ==
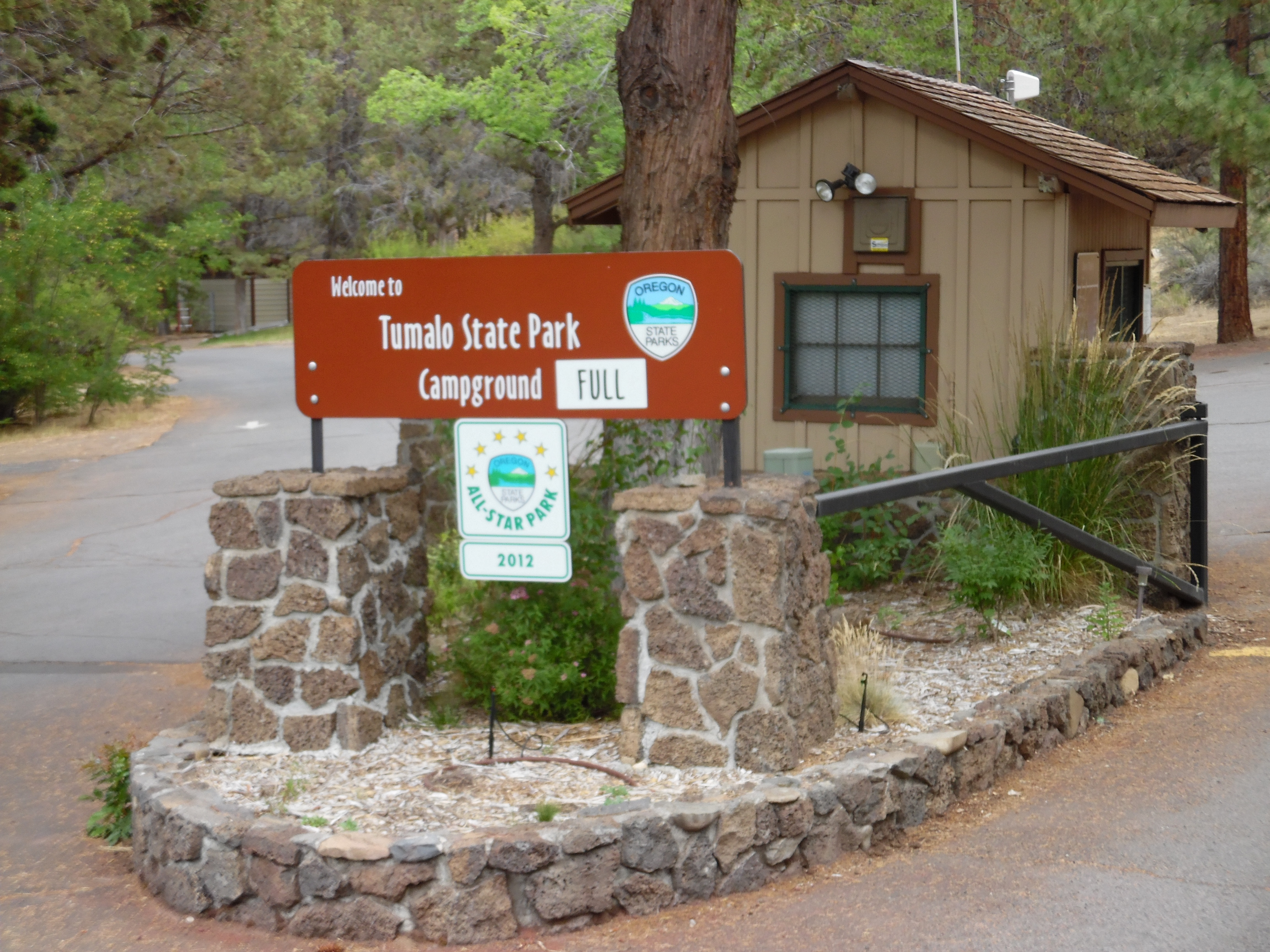
Entrance to Tumalo State Park campground

The park is bisected north to south by O.B. Riley Road (also known as the Old McKenzie-Bend Highway) which is a rural highway running from the city of Bend to the unincorporated community of Tumalo. The developed part of the park is on the south side of the Deschutes River. Park facilities include access roads, parking areas, manicured lawns, restrooms, solar showers, laundry facilities, public phones, hiking trails, a large picnic area, and an overnight campground. The picnic area is west of the highway, while all the campsites are on the east side of the highway. In the picnic area, there is a group shelter that can accommodate 50 people. The campground has 50 tent sites, 23 trailer hook-up spots, and seven yurts. The park is open year-round. In 2013, the Oregon Parks and Recreation Department reported that Tumalo State Park had over 263,000 day-use visitors and more than 49,000 overnight campers per year.

Tumalo State Park is a very popular site for wading, swimming, and inner tubing during the summer. There is also a children’s playground available for day-use visitors. The park provides access to several hiking trails that are also well used by mountain bikers. Fishing along the Deschutes River is very good, especially in the spring and late summer. Rainbow and brown trout are the most common catch. In addition, the juniper woodlands, riparian environment and rock cliffs along the river attract a wide range of birds, making the park a good place for birdwatching.

== See also ==
- List of Oregon state parks
- Tumalo Falls
