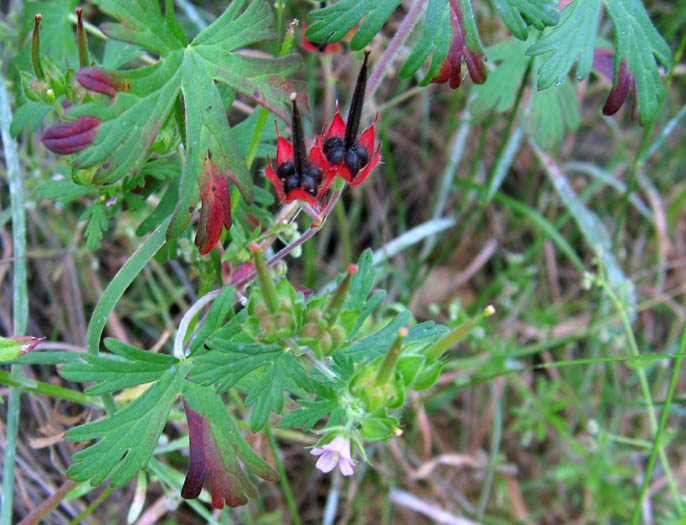

Conservation status
- Secure (NatureServe)

Scientific classification
- Kingdom: Plantae
- Clade: Embryophytes
- Clade: Tracheophytes
- Clade: Spermatophytes
- Clade: Angiosperms
- Clade: Eudicots
- Clade: Rosids
- Order: Geraniales
- Family: Geraniaceae
- Genus: Geranium
- Species: G. carolinianum

Binomial name
- Geranium carolinianum L., 1753

Synonyms
- List: Geranium atrum Moench (1794); Geranium carolinum Crantz (1766); Geranium dissectum var. carolinianum (L.) Hook.f. (1864); Geranium langloisii Greene (1897); Geranium lanuginosum Jacq. (1797); Geranium lenticulum Raf. (1837); Geranium sphaerospermum Fernald (1935); Geranium thermale Rydb. (1900)

= Geranium carolinianum =

Plant species in the geranium family

Geranium carolinianum is a species of geranium known by the common name Carolina crane's-bill, or Carolina geranium. It is an annual herb native to North America, where it is widespread and grows in many types of habitat. There are two varieties; G. carolinianum var. carolinianum and G. carolinianum var. sphaerospermum. It may be considered an invasive species outside the southeastern United States.

== Description ==
Geranium carolinianum has erect pubescent or hairy stems, typically colored pink or red. There are two leaves per node on each stem, which may be either alternate or opposite. The stem is not succulent, and not nutrient-rich as a source of calories for herbivores.

The palm-shaped leaves are several centimeters wide, ranging between 3–8 cm (1.2–3.1 in). They are usually divided into five segments, which are each subdivided into elegantly-pointed lobes and secondary lobes. The fine hairs on the surface of the leaves may give them a silvery or grey hue, with the underlying color shifting from green to a deep red at maturity.

The inflorescence is a cluster of one to several small flowers. Each flower has five-pointed sepals which can be as long as the petals, and five-notched petals in shades of white, light pink to lavender. This is a distinguishing factor for discriminating G. carolinianum from other species of Geranium. The flowers form in short tight clusters which grow off the main stems. The anthers do not have nectar spurs. The carpels have hair and are fused together. There are five carpels and one pistil. The petals are rounded. The color of the sepals is green to brown; they are ovate. Despite being thin, dry and paper-like, the sepals are flexible. The plant does not persist after flowering. Flowers of G. carolinianum bloom from late March through July. They do not give off any strong aroma or scent to attract pollinators into visiting the flower, relying solely on visual stimuli to attract insects to their sap.

The fruit has a hairy body and a style up to 1.5 cm (0.59 in) long; it can grow to a length of 5 mm (0.20 in). As with other species of geranium, the fruit has long, beak-like structures, giving the plant its common name of crane's-bill. The seed surfaces are finely reticulated. The seeds have pits or depressions in them and are wingless. The fruit is dry, and does not split open when ripened. The root system of G. carolinium is a taproot structure that can grow to a depth of 15 cm (5.9 in). The plant has a superior ovary.

== Range and Distribution ==
Geranium carolinianum is found throughout much of the continental United States, from the New England region south to Central Mexico and along the Eastern coast. The plant likes arid areas that are nutrient-poor and have little competition, such as clay and limestone prairies, lawns and roadsides, as well as abandoned fields and farmlands.

G. carolinianum can survive in soils with pH levels that are too high for many plants, as long as there is an adequate supply of water.

== Medicinal Applications ==
There is potential for Geranium carolinianum to fight hepatitis B. The ethanol extracted from the plant has been effective in treating inflammatory issues as well. The presence of the anti-HBV compounds in the geraniin, ellagic acid and hyperin in G. carolinianum L. might account for the effectiveness of this folk medicine in the treatment of HBV infections.

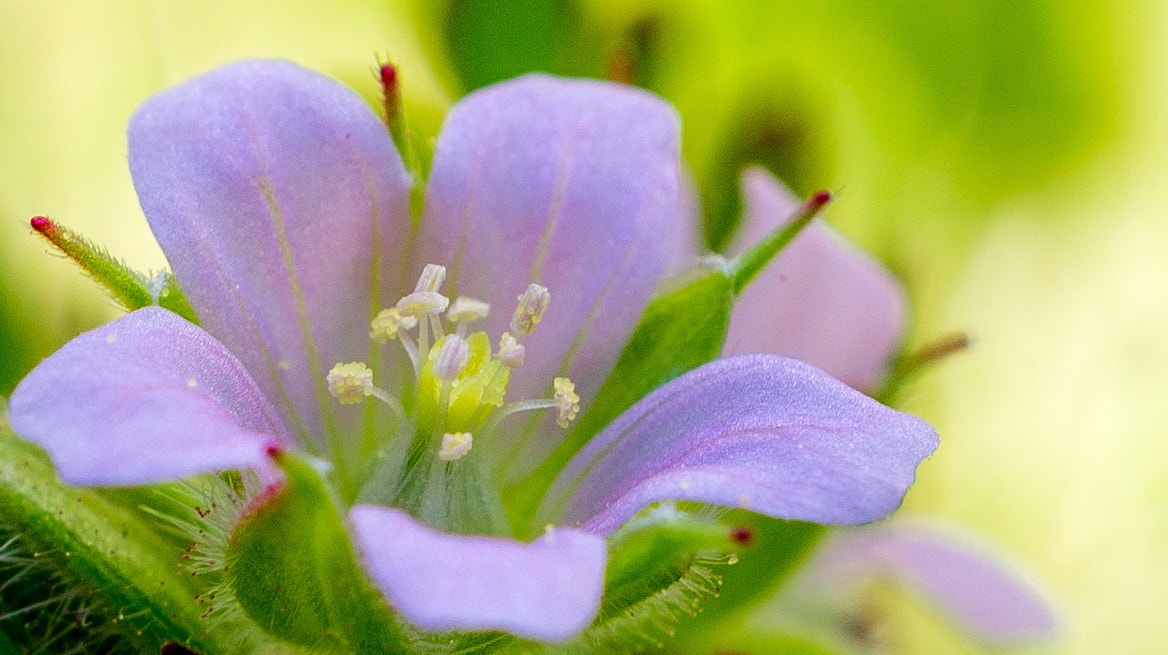
Image depicts the flowers of G. carolinianum.

== Cultivation ==
Geranium carolinianum enjoys soils that do not have excessive competition. The plant may be considered invasive in some regions, such as Kentucky, New York, and Illinois, because it grows rampantly, and can smother desirable plants. It is self-seeding and can survive being transplanted from one location to another in cultivation.

== Wildlife use ==
Insect visitors that have been observed collecting nectar include long-tongued bees (Megachile spp.), short-tongued bees (Halictid bees), and flower flies (Syrphids) who, in the larval stage, can provide early, cool-season aphid control. Northern bobwhites as well as mourning doves are known to eat the seeds of the plant. It is also a preferred winter forage for white-tailed deer in the Southeast, with an average of 19 percent crude protein in the vegetative state.
