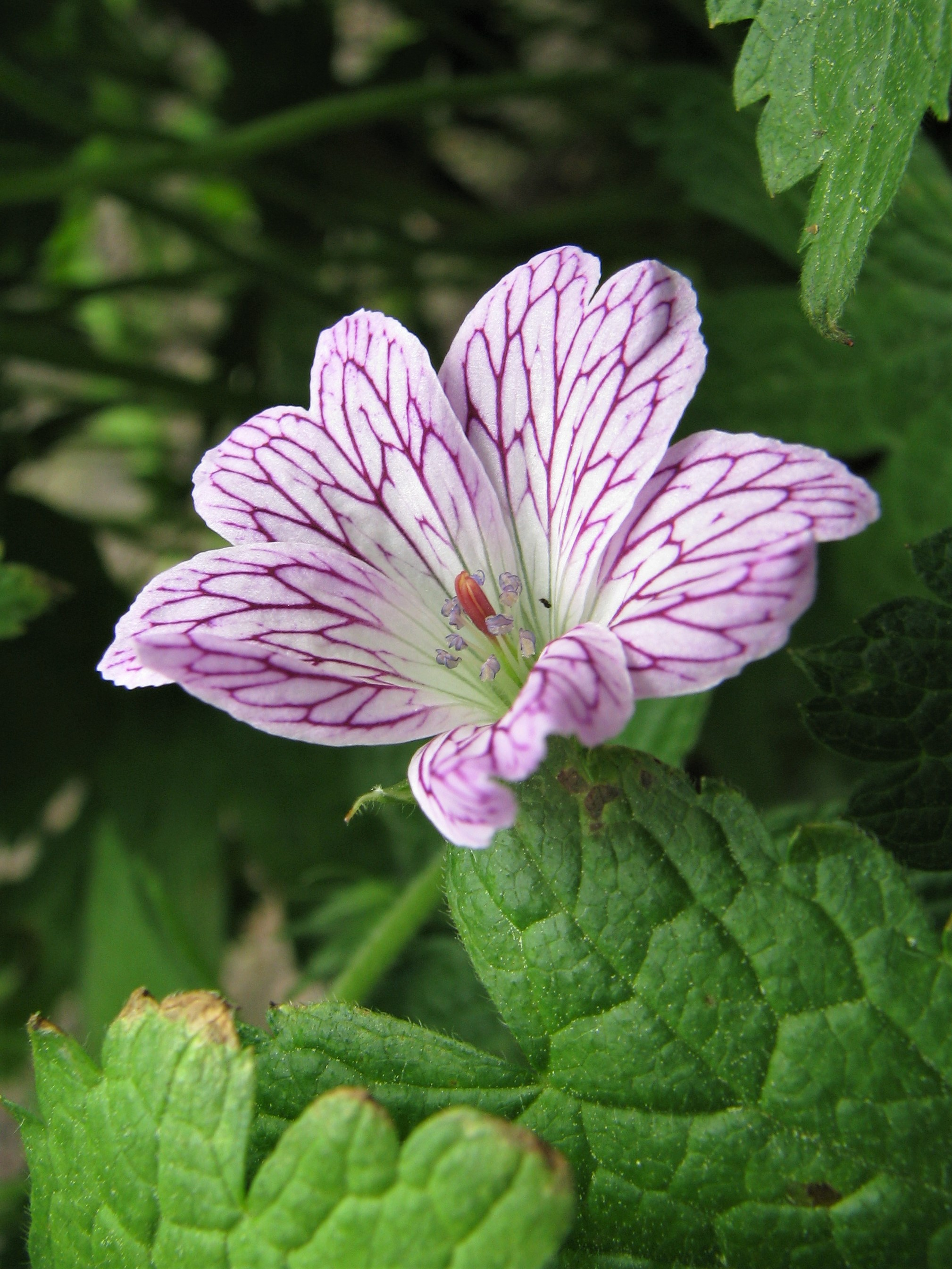
- Flower
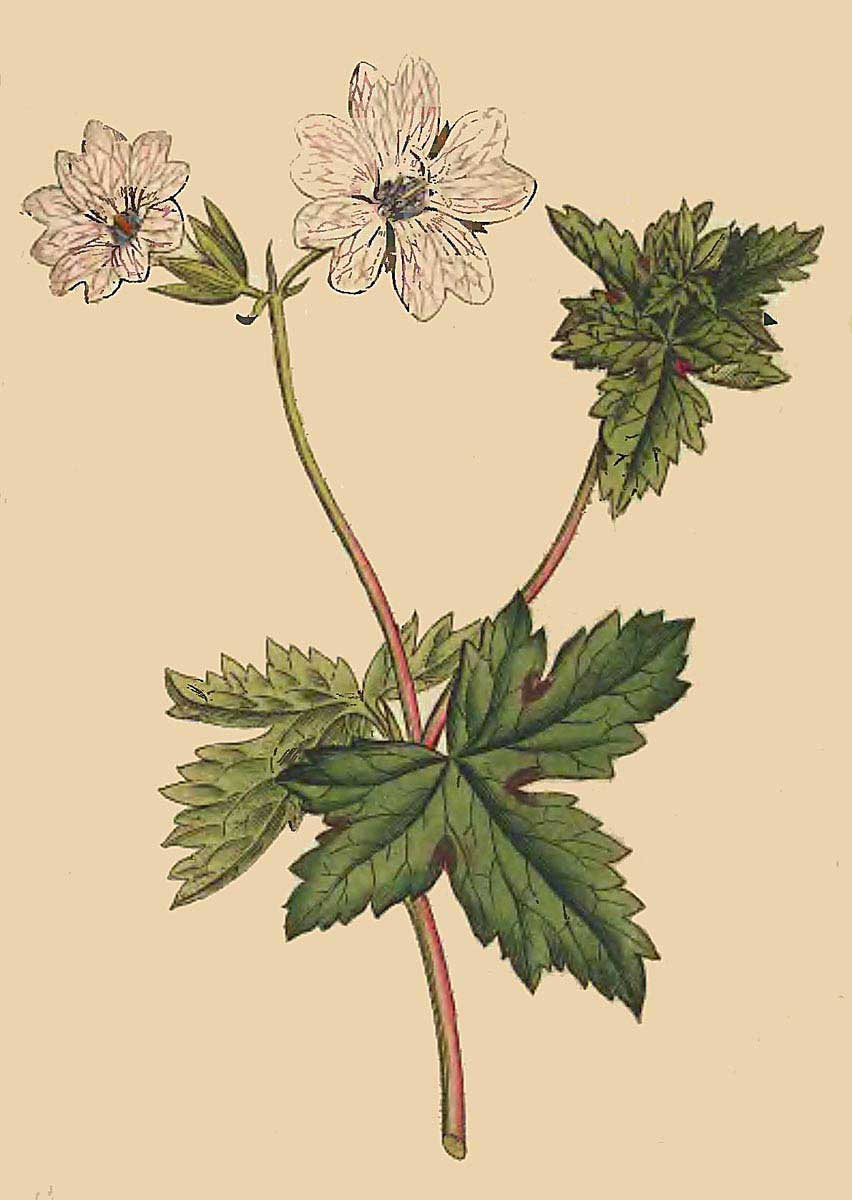
- Botanical illustration

Scientific classification
- Kingdom: Plantae
- Clade: Tracheophytes
- Clade: Angiosperms
- Clade: Eudicots
- Clade: Rosids
- Order: Geraniales
- Family: Geraniaceae
- Genus: Geranium
- Species: G. versicolor

Binomial name
- Geranium versicolor L.

Synonyms
- Geranium nodosum subsp. striatum (L.) Bonnier; Geranium striatum L.

= Geranium versicolor =

Species of plant

Geranium versicolor, the pencilled geranium, pencilled cranesbill, veined cranesbill, or veiny geranium, is a species of flowering plant in the family Geraniaceae. It is native to southeastern Europe, and has been introduced as a garden escapee to Ireland, Great Britain, France, the former Czechoslovakia, and the US state of Pennsylvania. A semi‑evergreen perennial reaching 45 cm (18 in), it is widely available from commercial suppliers, with the Royal Horticultural Society considering it to be a good plant to attract pollinators. With Geranium endressii it is a parent of the artificial garden hybrid Geranium × oxonianum.
