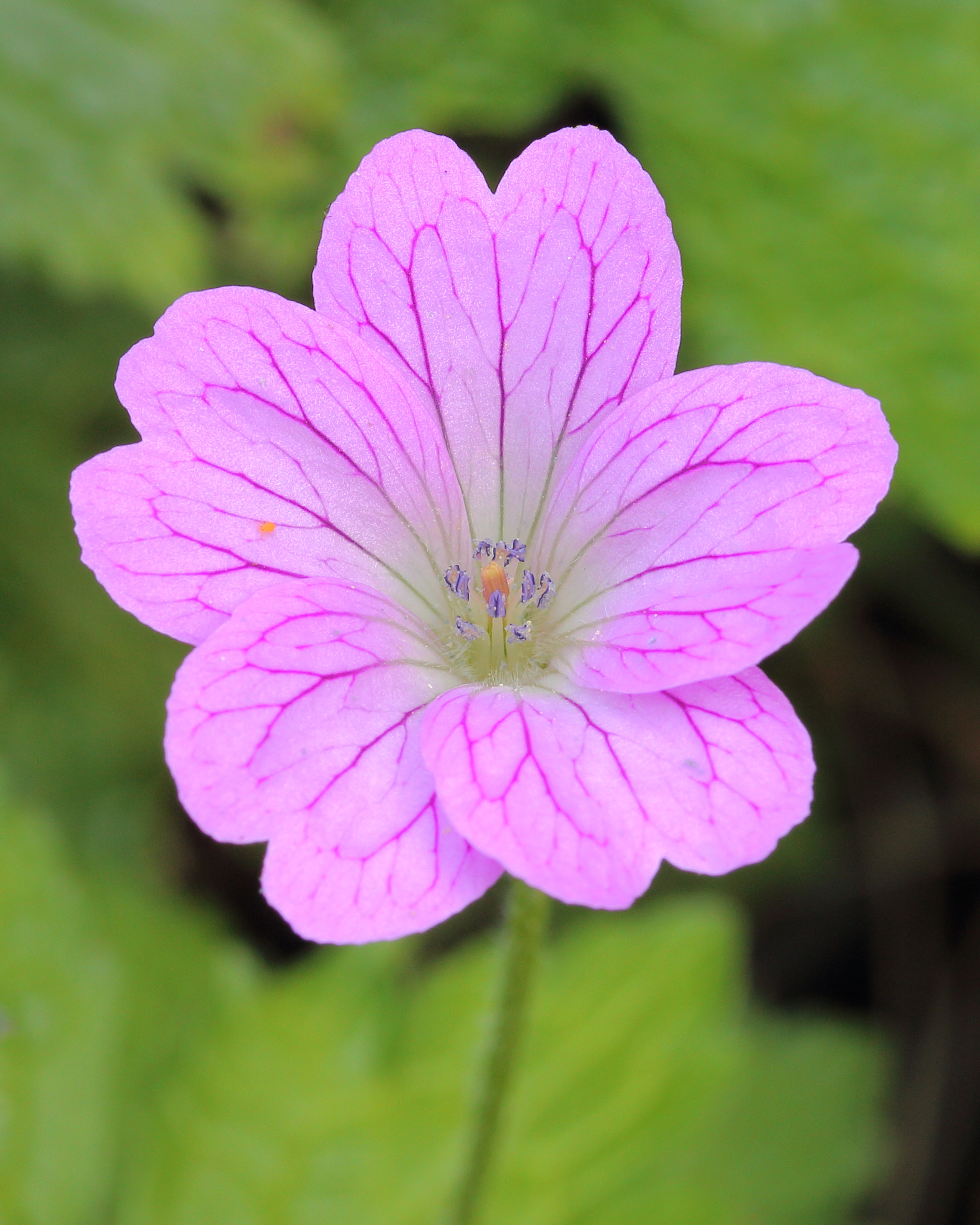

Scientific classification
- Kingdom: Plantae
- Clade: Tracheophytes
- Clade: Angiosperms
- Clade: Eudicots
- Clade: Rosids
- Order: Geraniales
- Family: Geraniaceae
- Genus: Geranium
- Species: G. × oxonianum

Binomial name
- Geranium × oxonianum P.F.Yeo

= Geranium × oxonianum =

Species of flowering plant

Geranium × oxonianum, the Oxford geranium, is a hybrid variety of flowering plant in the family Geraniaceae. It is a 1932 cross of garden origin between Geranium endressii and Geranium versicolor. Growing to 0.5 m (1.6 ft) tall by 1 m (3.3 ft), it is a highly variable plant with round palmate leaves and often veined flowers in various shades of pink. It can be invasive.

Hardy down to −20 °C (−4 °F) or below, this tough plant is the source of several cultivars. The following have been given the Royal Horticultural Society's Award of Garden Merit:

- "A.T. Johnson"
- "Beholder's Eye"
- "Wageningen"
