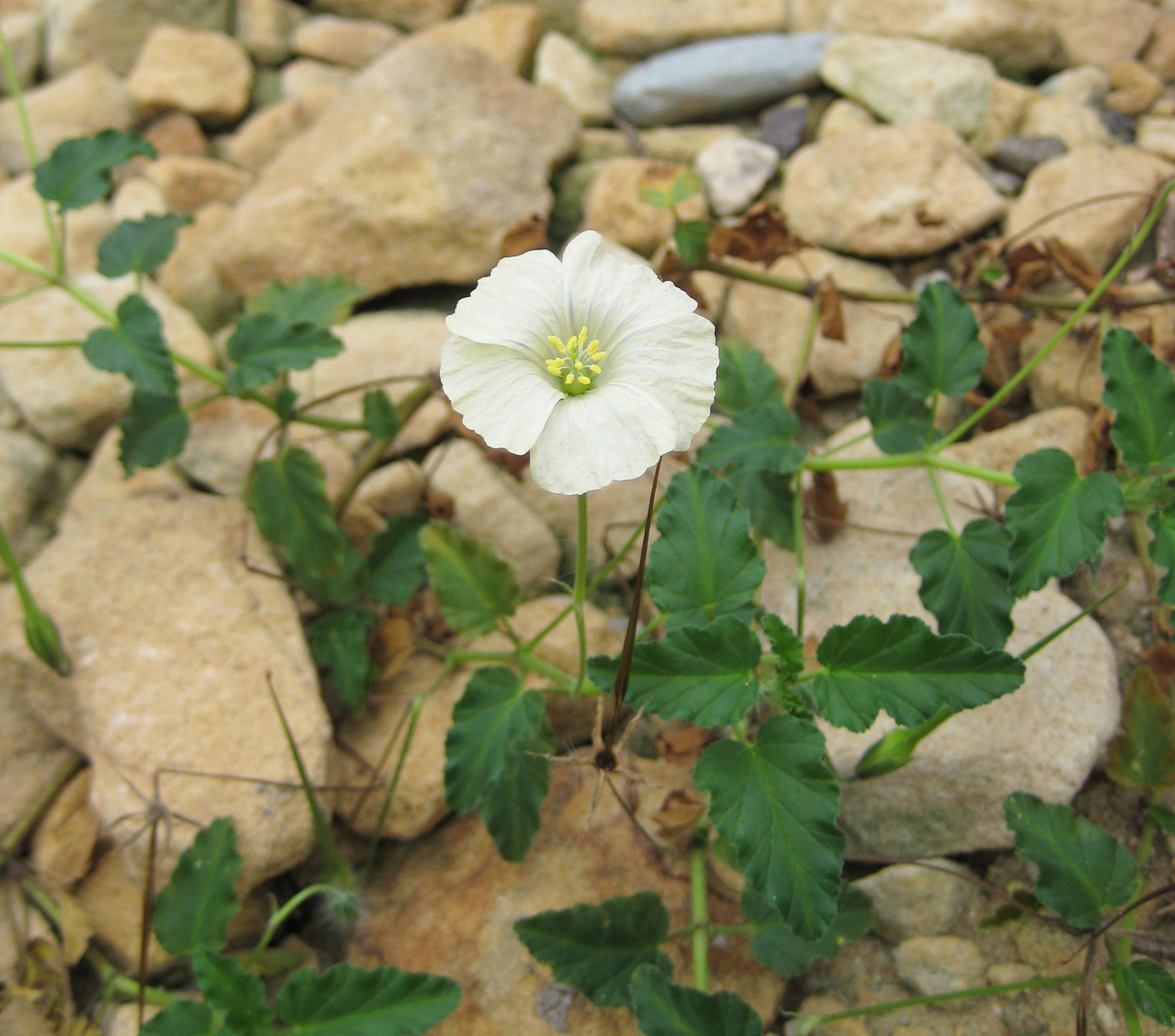

Scientific classification
- Kingdom: Plantae
- Clade: Tracheophytes
- Clade: Angiosperms
- Clade: Eudicots
- Clade: Rosids
- Order: Geraniales
- Family: Geraniaceae
- Genus: Monsonia
- Species: M. emarginata

Binomial name
- Monsonia emarginata (L.f.) L'Hér.

= Monsonia emarginata =

Species of flowering plant

Monsonia emarginata is a species of plant in the family Geraniaceae native to southern Africa.

== Description ==
Monsonia emarginata is an annual or occasionally perennial shrub. Leaves are green and the flowers are white.
