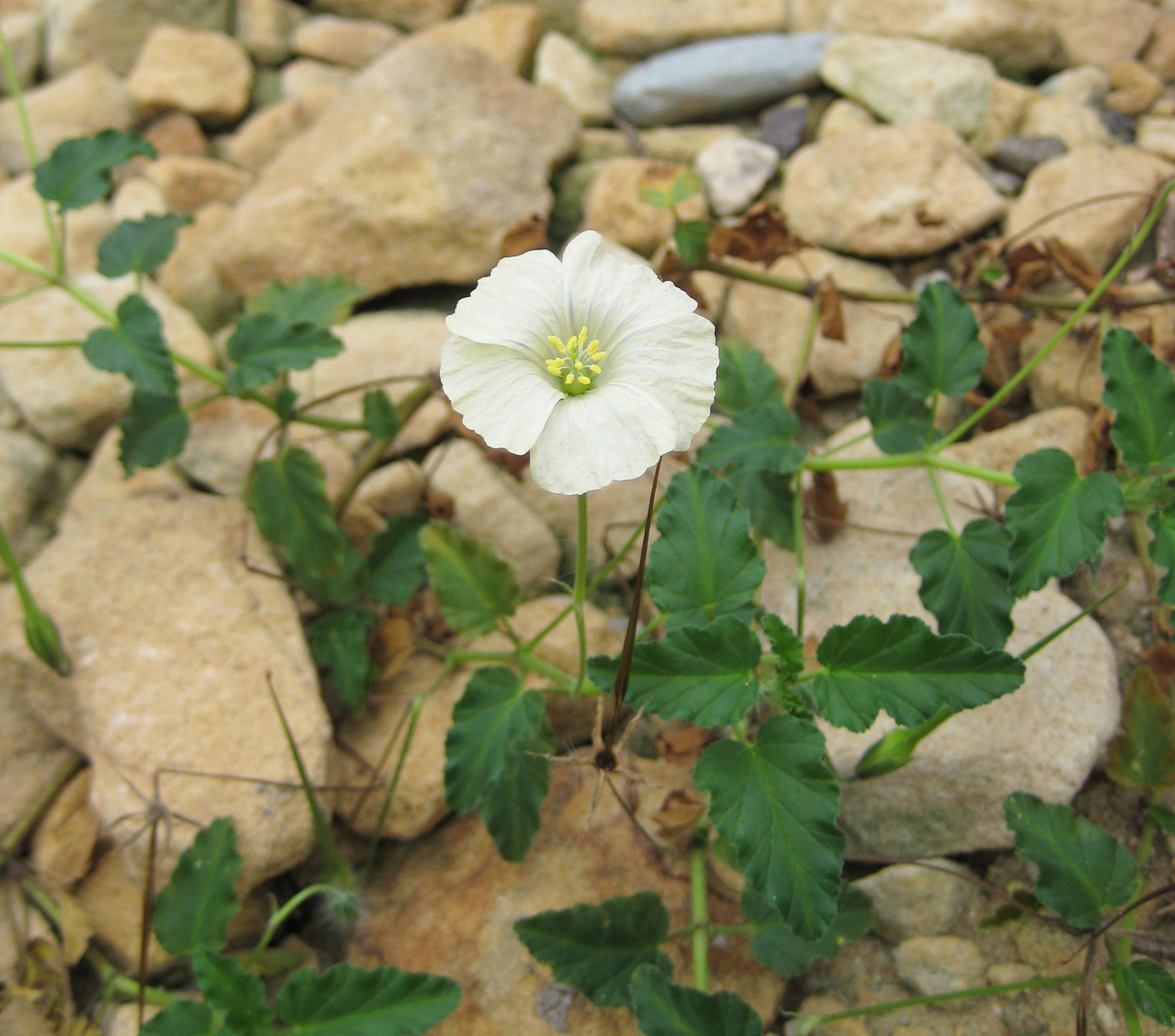
- Monsonia emarginata

Scientific classification
- Kingdom: Plantae
- Clade: Tracheophytes
- Clade: Angiosperms
- Clade: Eudicots
- Clade: Rosids
- Order: Geraniales
- Family: Geraniaceae
- Genus: Monsonia; L.

= Monsonia =

Genus of flowering plants

Monsonia is a genus of plants in the family Geraniaceae. It is named after Lady Anne Monson, 1714–76, known for her botanical knowledge and plant collecting in the Cape.

== Description ==
Monsonia consists of herbs or undershrubs often with simple stem from woody rootstock or deep tap root; leaves toothed or divided; flowers regular, petals 5, separate, tip broad, blunt or slightly notched, stamens in 5 groups with 3 stamens in each, one longer than others, ovary 5 lobed; fruit beaked.

== Taxonomy ==
As of July 2020, the World Checklist of Selected Plant Families accepts 27 species:

- Monsonia angustifolia E.Mey. ex A.Rich.
- Monsonia attenuata Harv.
- Monsonia biflora DC.
- Monsonia brevirostrata R.Knuth
- Monsonia burkeana Planch. ex Harv.
- Monsonia deserticola Dinter ex R.Knuth
- Monsonia drudeana Schinz
- Monsonia emarginata (L.f.) L'Hér.
- Monsonia galpinii Schltr. ex R.Knuth
- Monsonia glauca R.Knuth
- Monsonia grandifolia R.Knuth
- Monsonia heliotropioides (Cav.) Boiss.
- Monsonia ignea Schinz
- Monsonia ignorata Merxm. & A.Schreib.
- Monsonia lanuginosa R.Knuth
- Monsonia lavrani (Halda) C.C.Walker
- Monsonia longipes R.Knuth
- Monsonia luederitziana Focke & Schinz
- Monsonia natalensis R.Knuth
- Monsonia nivea (Decne.) Webb
- Monsonia parvifolia Schinz
- Monsonia praemorsa E.Mey. ex R.Knuth
- Monsonia senegalensis Guill. & Perr.
- Monsonia speciosa L.
- Monsonia transvaalensis R.Knuth
- Monsonia trilobata Kers
- Monsonia umbellata Harv.

== Distribution ==
Distributed in Africa, Western Asia and East India, approximately 40 species, approximately 21 in South Africa.

== Gallery ==
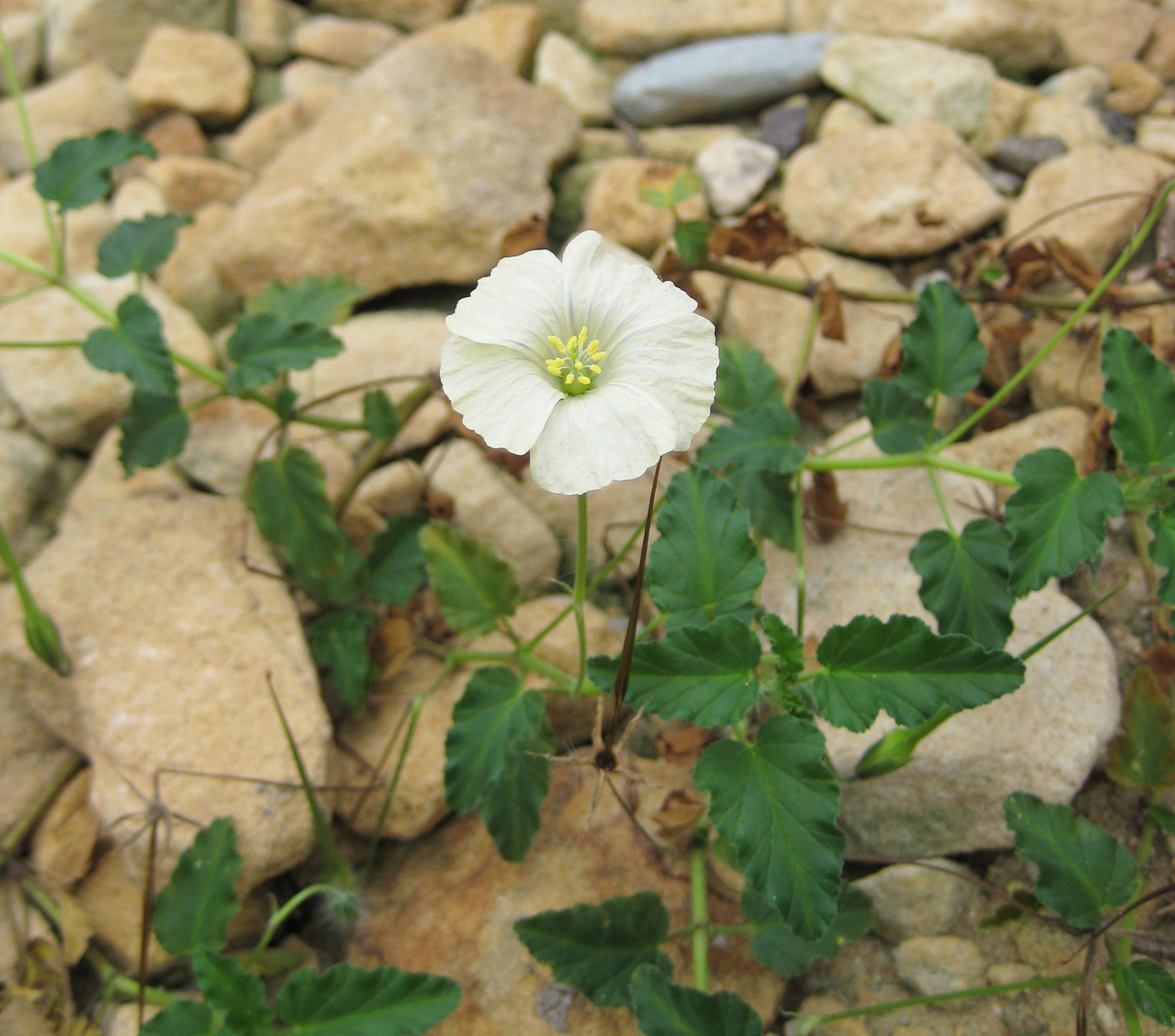
Monsonia emarginata

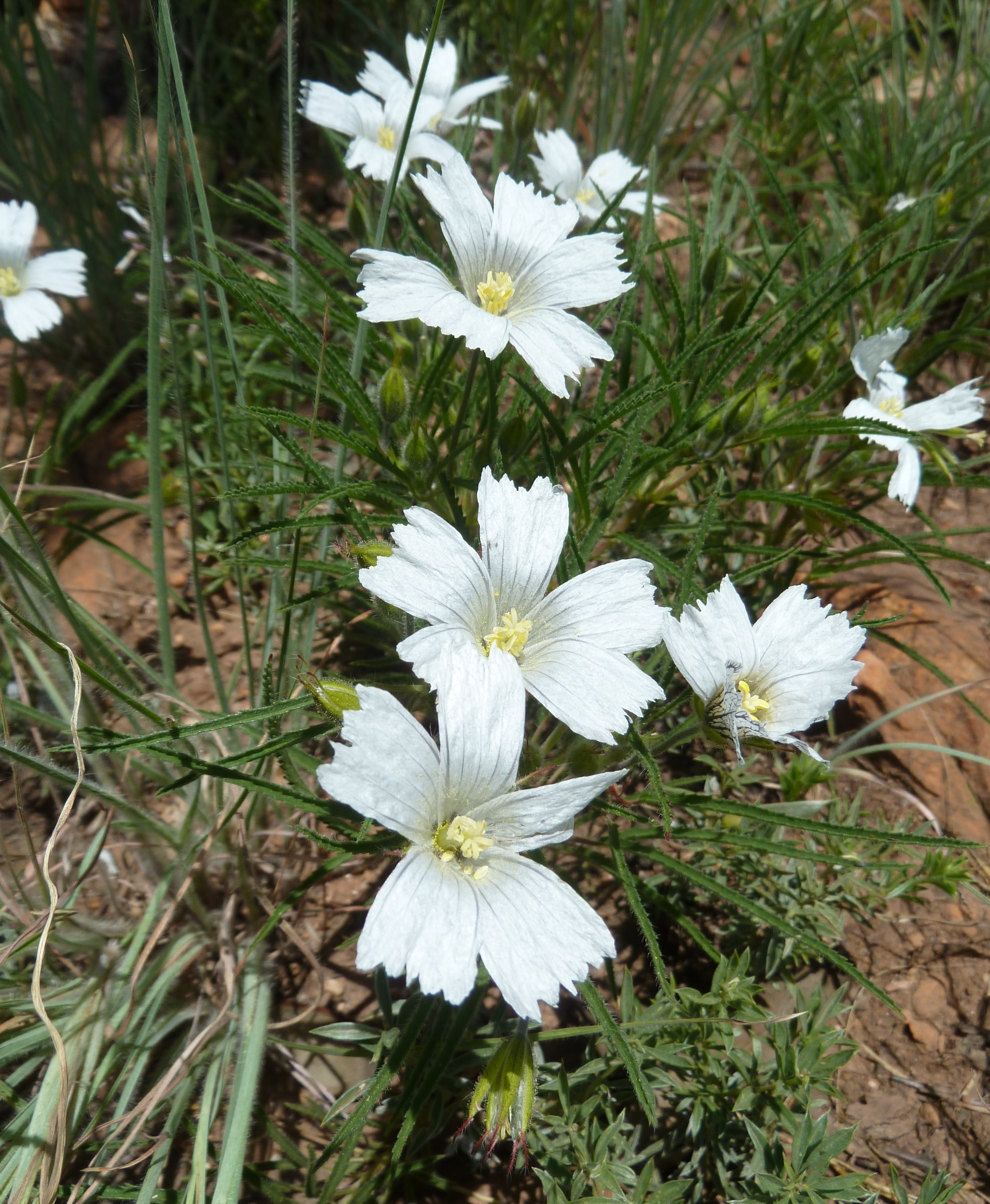
Monsonia attenuata

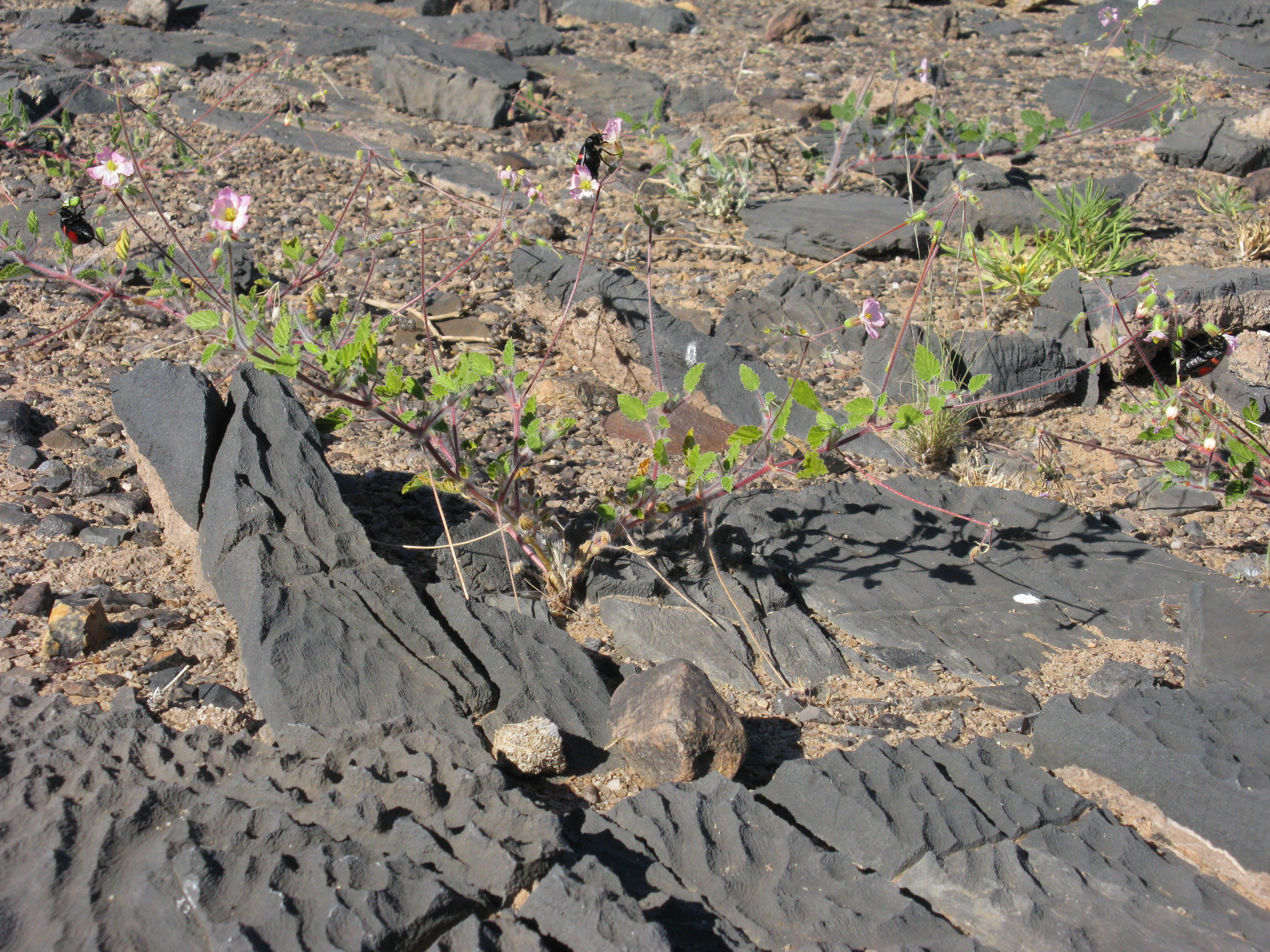
Monsonia umbellata

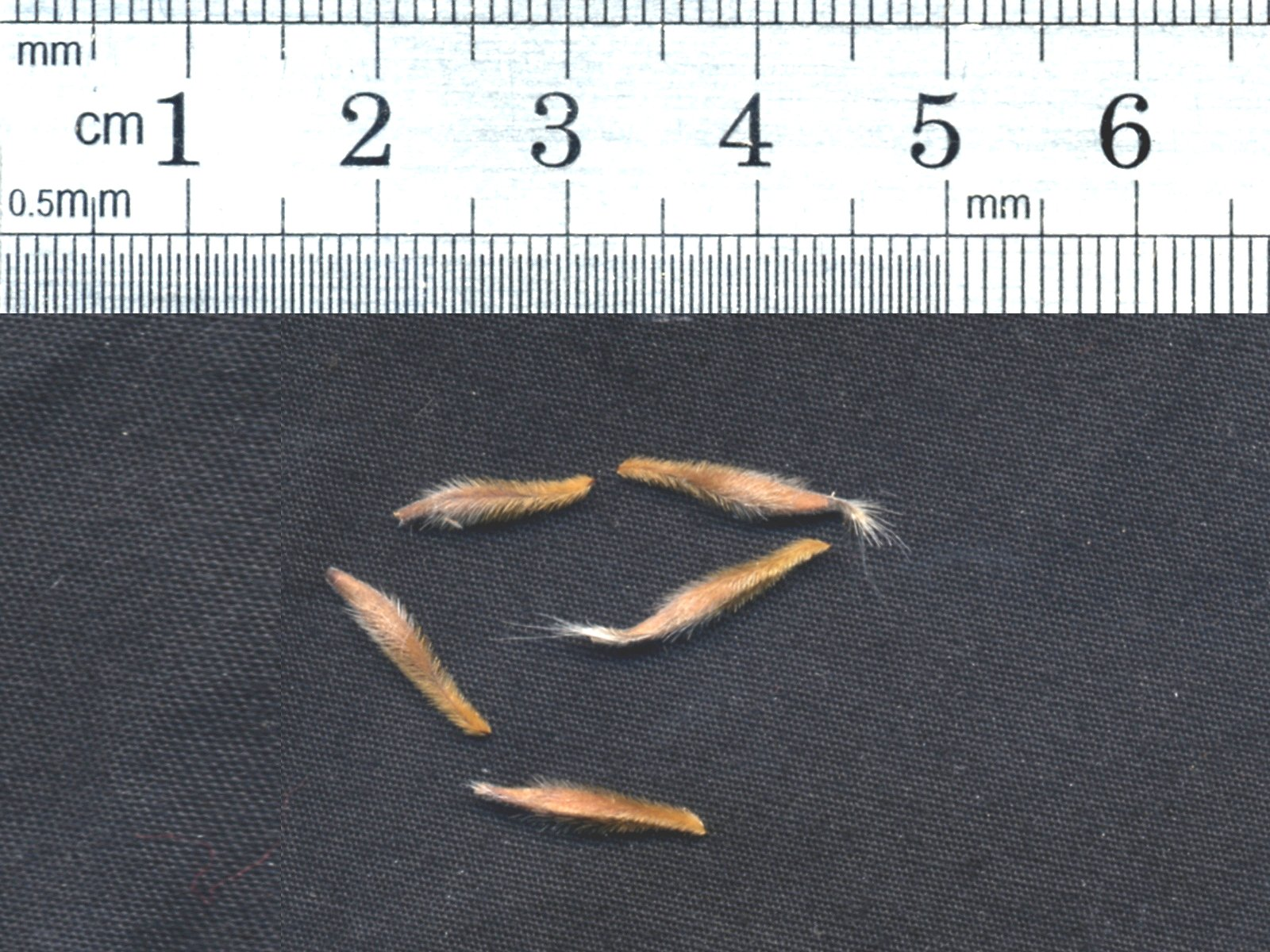
Monsonia praemorsa seeds.

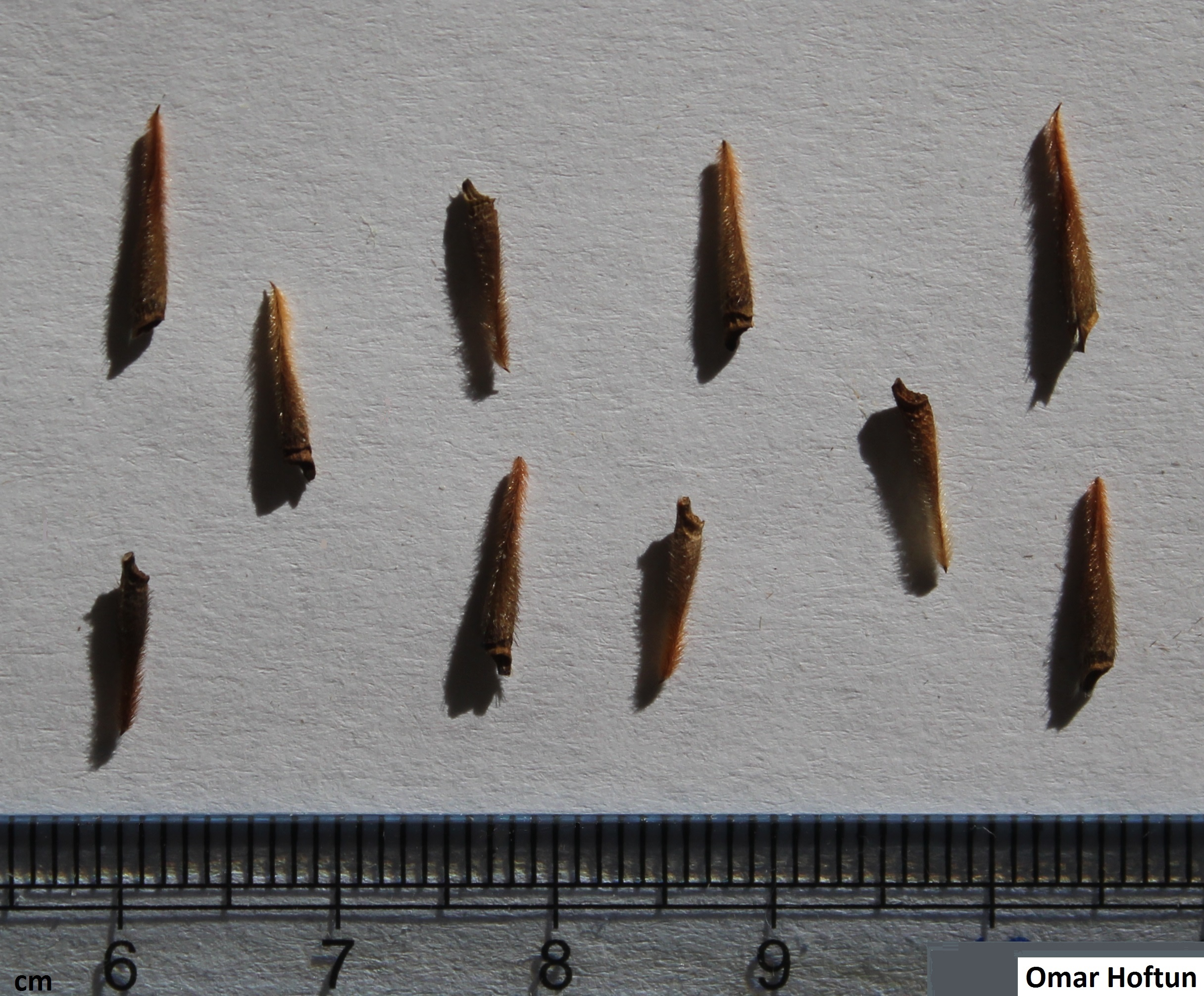
Monsonia angustifolia seeds.
