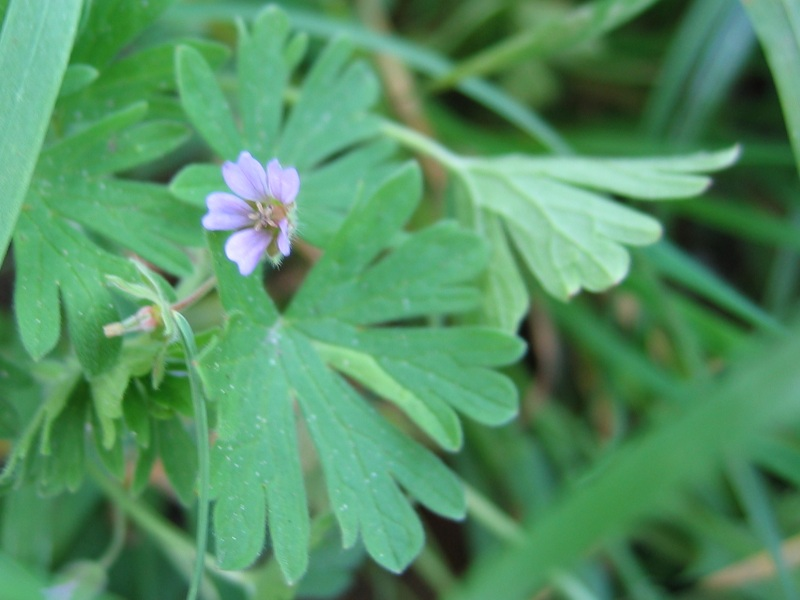

Scientific classification
- Kingdom: Plantae
- Clade: Tracheophytes
- Clade: Angiosperms
- Clade: Eudicots
- Clade: Rosids
- Order: Geraniales
- Family: Geraniaceae
- Genus: Geranium
- Species: G. pusillum

Binomial name
- Geranium pusillum L., 1759

Synonyms
- List: Geranium baumgartenianum Schur (1866); Geranium circinatum Kanitz (1863); Geranium delicatulum Ten. & Guss. (1836); Geranium delicatulum Ten. & Guss. (1836); Geranium divaricatum var. tenuisectum Sennen (1917); Geranium dubium Chaix (1786); Geranium elatum Picard (1887); Geranium haussknechtii Soó (1980); Geranium humile Cav. (1787); Geranium hybridum Hausskn. (1891); Geranium malvifolium Scop. (1771); Geranium parviflorum Curtis (1791); Geranium parviflorum var. humile (Cav.) Chevall. (1828); Geranium pseudopusillum Schur (1868)

= Geranium pusillum =

Plant species in the geranium family

Geranium pusillum, commonly known as small-flowered crane's-bill or (in North America) small geranium, is a herbaceous annual plant of the genus Geranium.

Small geranium is native to Europe but is introduced in almost every region of the USA and Canada, where it is associated with ecologically disturbed sites.
