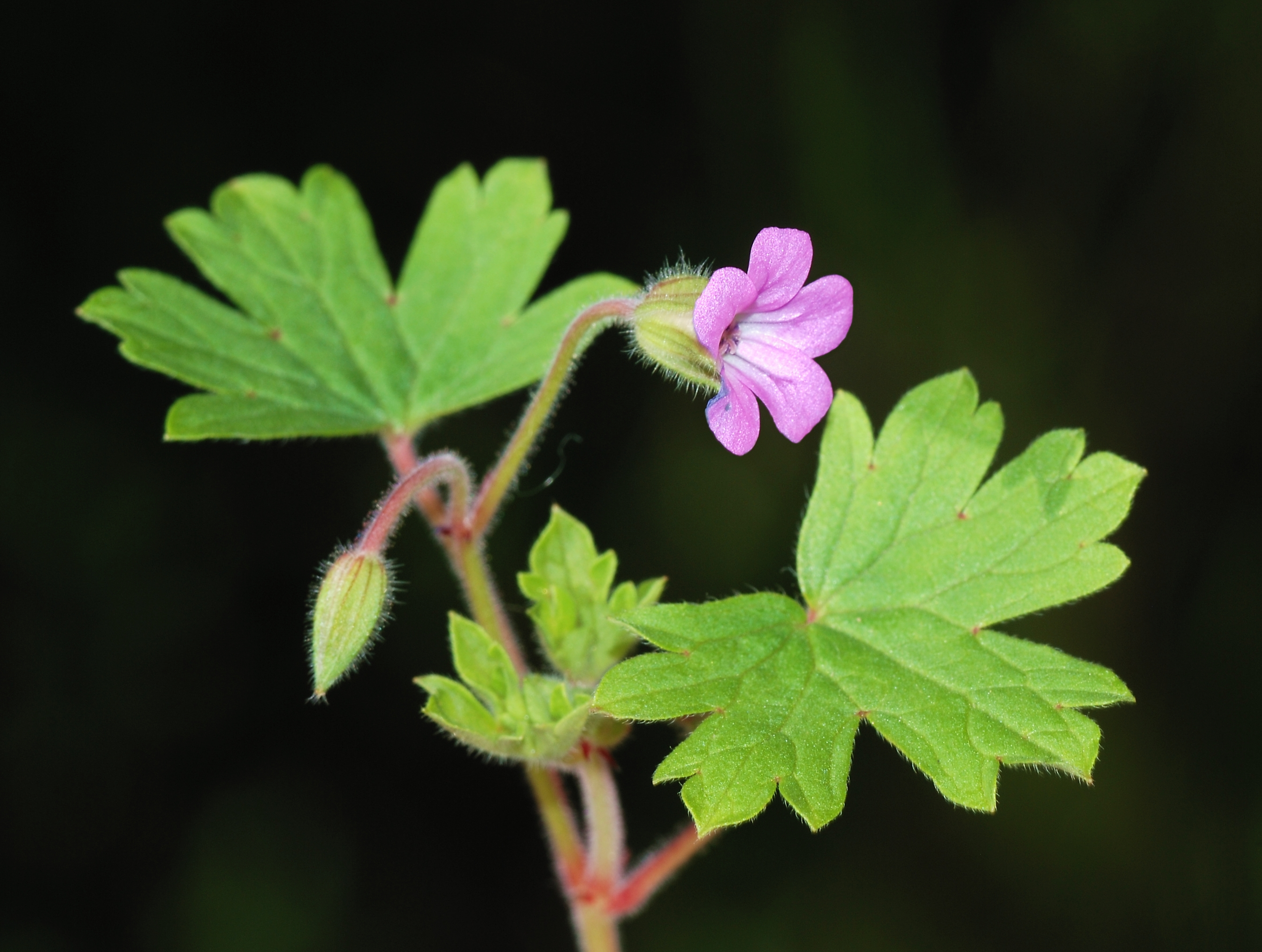

Scientific classification
- Kingdom: Plantae
- Clade: Tracheophytes
- Clade: Angiosperms
- Clade: Eudicots
- Clade: Rosids
- Order: Geraniales
- Family: Geraniaceae
- Genus: Geranium
- Species: G. rotundifolium

Binomial name
- Geranium rotundifolium L., 1753

= Geranium rotundifolium =

Plant species in the geranium family

Geranium rotundifolium (round-leaved crane's-bill), is a species of annual herb in the family Geraniaceae. It is native in temperate climates across much of Europe, northern Africa, and southwestern Asia; its distribution is spreading north, in response to global warming. The species favours dry, sandy or stony habitat, including old walls, rail ballast, and building rubble, including in urban areas.

The basal leaves are simple, 3–6 cm across, broad rounded kidney-shaped, with a shallowly lobed margin; leaves higher up the stem are smaller and more deeply lobed. The flowering stems can grow to 20 cm tall; both the stems and leaves are hairy with glandular hairs. The flowers are small, 10–16 mm diameter, pink, with five petals with a rounded to shallowly two-lobed apex (unlike similar related species, which have a more deeply notched petal apex). The flowers are visited by sweat bees, small carpenter bees, myopa, and cabbage butterfly.

== Sources ==
This article incorporates text from a free content work. Licensed under CC0 (license statement/permission). Text taken from Geranium rotundifolium. Encyclopedia of Life.
