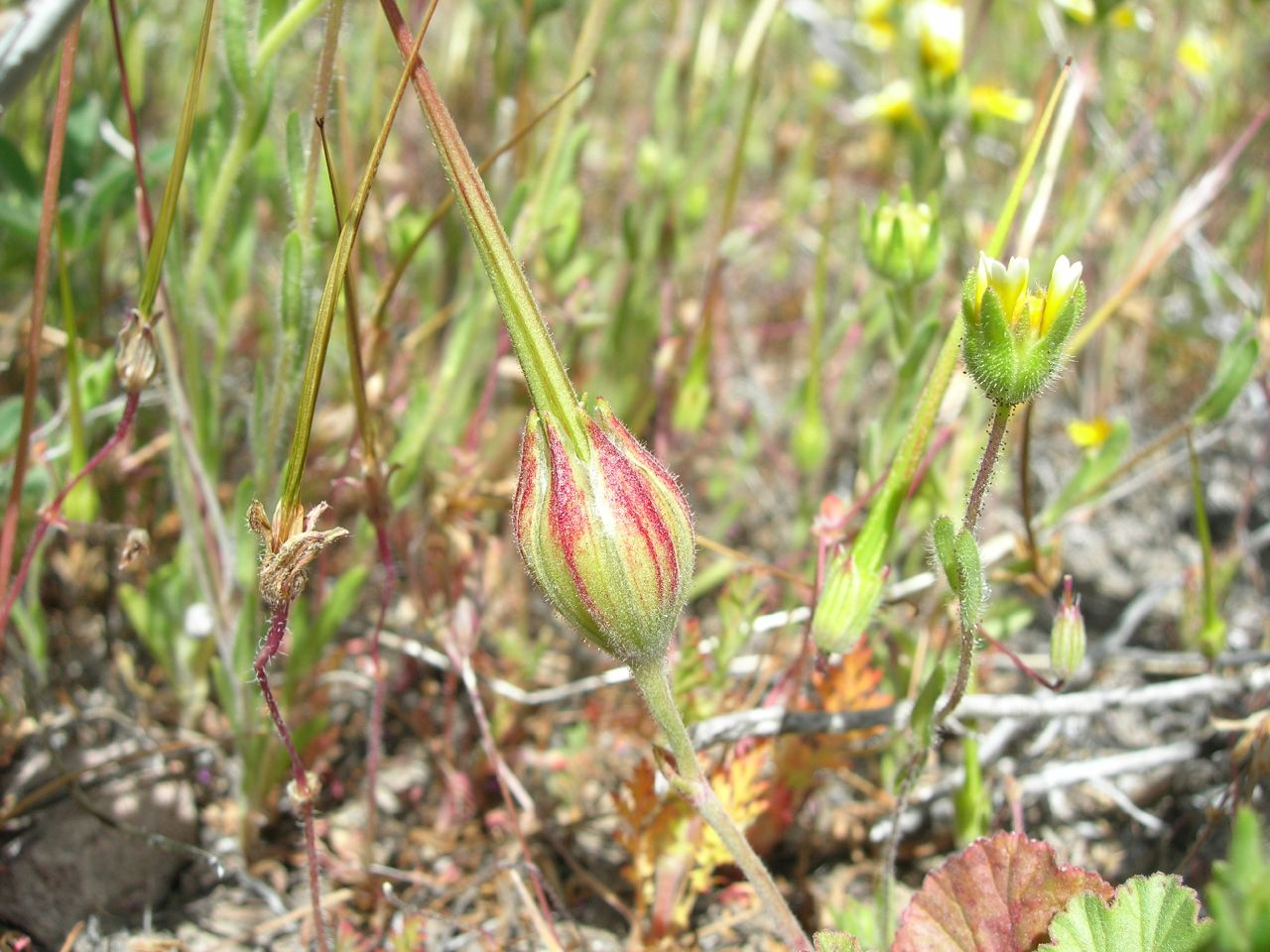

Conservation status
- Vulnerable (NatureServe)

Scientific classification
- Kingdom: Plantae
- Clade: Tracheophytes
- Clade: Angiosperms
- Clade: Eudicots
- Clade: Rosids
- Order: Geraniales
- Family: Geraniaceae
- Genus: California; Aldas, C. Navarro, P. Vargas, Ll. Sáez & Aedo
- Species: C. macrophylla

Binomial name
- California macrophylla (Hook. & Arn.) Aldasoro, C. Navarro, P. Vargas, Ll. Sáez & Aedo

Synonyms
- Erodium macrophyllum Hook. & Arn.

= California macrophylla =

Species of flowering plant

California macrophylla, commonly known as roundleaf stork's bill, is a species of flowering plant in the geranium family, Geraniaceae. It was formerly placed in the genus Erodium, but was later placed in a monotypic genus of its own named California.

== Description ==
It is native to the southwestern United States and northern Mexico, where it grows in open habitat such as grassland and scrub. It is an annual herb that grows only a few centimeters high (1 inch), forming a patch of slightly lobed, somewhat kidney-shaped to rounded leaves on long, slender petioles. Leaves are green dorsally and purple ventrally, often developing clear red veins once the leaves mature. The inflorescence is a fragile umbel of flowers with petals around a centimeter long (0.4 in) and white in color, often tinted pinkish or purplish. Petals break off easily and flowers rarely stay pristine for more than a day. The fruit has a fuzzy base and a long, narrow style which may reach 5 cm (2 in) in length.
