= Lady Anne Monson =

English botanist and collector of plants and insects

- Born: 1726; Darlington, England
- Died: 18 February 1776 (aged 49–50); Calcutta, British India
- Resting place: Calcutta, India
- Other names: Anne Vane, Ann Hope-Vere
- Spouse(s): Charles Hope-Weir; Colonel George Monson
- Children: 2
- Parent(s): Henry Vane, 1st Earl of Darlington; Lady Grace Fitzroy
- Scientific career
- Fields: Botany

Lady Anne Monson (née Vane; 25 June 1726 – 18 February 1776), also known as Lady Anne Hope-Vere, was an English botanist and collector of plants and insects. The plant genus Monsonia was named after her by Carolus Linnaeus.

== Life ==
She was the daughter of Henry Vane, 1st Earl of Darlington, and his wife, Lady Grace Fitzroy; she was a great-grandchild of Charles II. Her aunt, also Anne Vane, was a royal mistress.

In 1746, she married Charles Hope-Vere of Craigiehall and had two sons before the marriage was dissolved by Act of Parliament in 1757, due to the birth of an illegitimate child. No details of this child's father are known.

Later in 1757, she married Colonel George Monson of Lincolnshire. Since her new husband's career was with the Indian military, she spent most of her time in Calcutta, where she became prominent in Anglo-Indian society.

She died in Calcutta on 18 February 1776.

== Botany ==
Lady Anne's interest in natural history predated her arrival in India. In 1760, she was already well known to the botanical community as a "remarkable lady botanist".

It was claimed by her contemporary J. E. Smith that it was Lady Anne who assisted James Lee in translating Linnaeus's Philosophia Botanica, the first work to explain the Linnaean classification to English readers. Lee published the book under his own name in 1760, and acknowledged Lady Anne anonymously in the preface. A few years later Lady Anne was introduced to the Danish entomologist Johan Christian Fabricius, one of Linnaeus's pupils. Later, Lady Anne is mentioned by James Lee in her letters to Linnaeus.

In 1774, on the way out to Calcutta, Lady Anne visited the Cape of Good Hope where she met another of Linnaeus's pupils, Carl Peter Thunberg, a seasoned collector of South African plants. Thunberg accompanied her on several expeditions around Cape Town, and she presented him with a ring in remembrance. Specimens of Monsonia, a flowering shrub, were sent to Kew Gardens in 1774.

== Legacy ==
One of the South African plants collected by Lady Anne was named Monsonia by Linnaeus.
