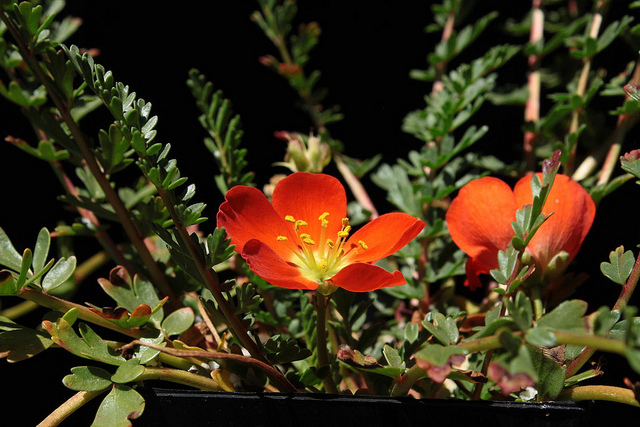
- H. pimpinellifolia

Scientific classification
- Kingdom: Plantae
- Clade: Tracheophytes
- Clade: Angiosperms
- Clade: Eudicots
- Clade: Rosids
- Order: Geraniales
- Family: Geraniaceae
- Genus: Hypseocharis; J.Rémy

= Hypseocharis =

Genus of plants

Hypseocharis is a genus of flowering plants belonging to the family Geraniaceae.

== Distribution ==
Its native range is Peru to Northwestern Argentina.

Species:

- Hypseocharis bilobata Killip
- Hypseocharis malpasensis R.Knuth
- Hypseocharis pedicularifolia R.Knuth
- Hypseocharis pilgeri R.Knuth
- Hypseocharis pimpinellifolia J.Rémy
- Hypseocharis tridentata Griseb.
