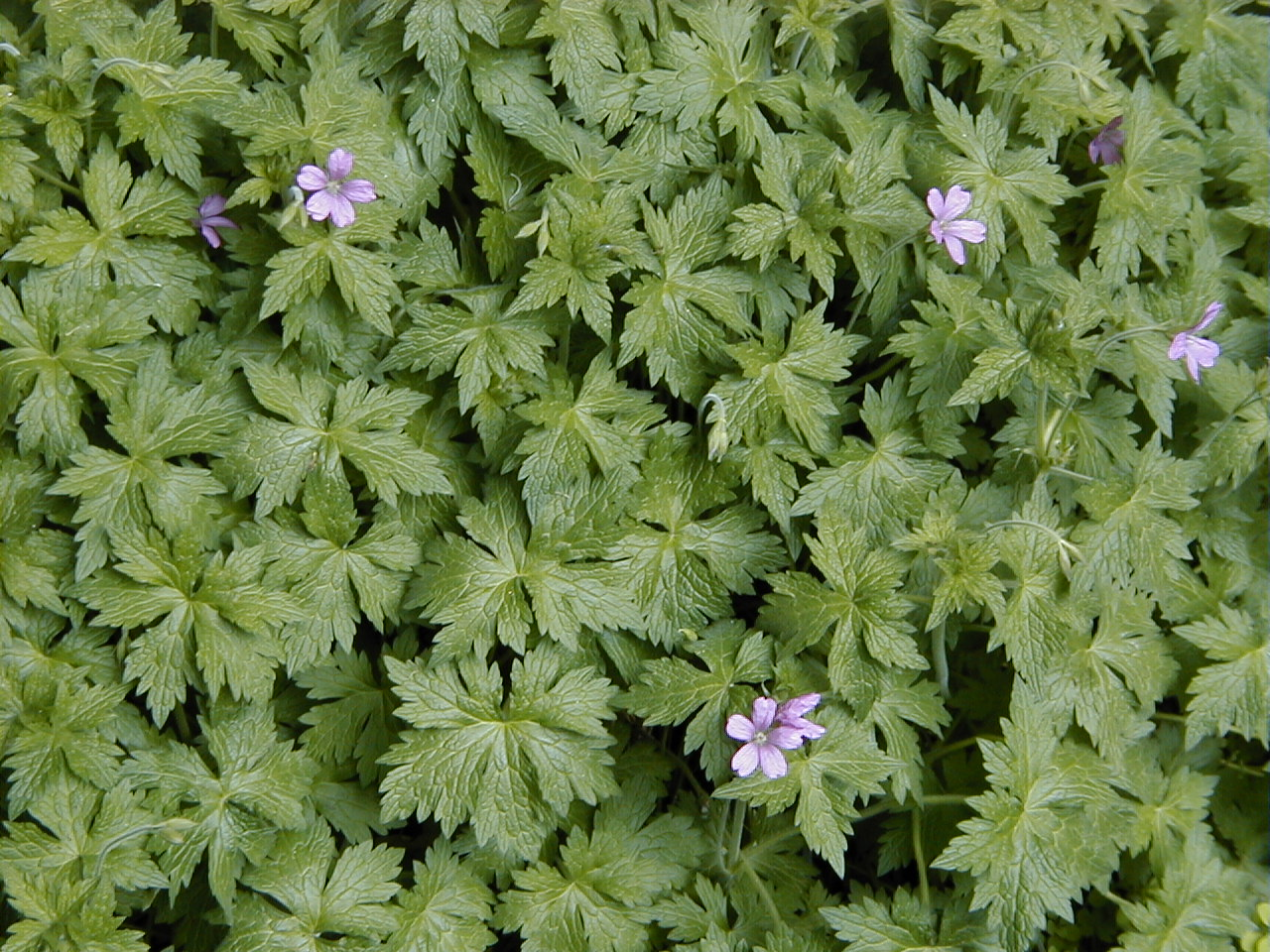

Scientific classification
- Kingdom: Plantae
- Clade: Tracheophytes
- Clade: Angiosperms
- Clade: Eudicots
- Clade: Rosids
- Order: Geraniales
- Family: Geraniaceae
- Genus: Geranium
- Species: G. endressii

Binomial name
- Geranium endressii J.Gay

Synonyms
- Geranium palustre subsp. endressii (J.Gay) Bonnier & Layens

= Geranium endressii =

Species of flowering plant

Geranium endressii, commonly called Endres cranesbill or French crane's-bill, is a species of hardy flowering herbaceous or semi-evergreen perennial plant in the genus Geranium, family Geraniaceae.

It is native to the Western Pyrenees in Spain, and is cultivated as a garden subject. Growing to 75 cm (30 in) tall and broad, it has a mounding to sprawling habit, therefore is useful as groundcover in light shade. The leaves are deeply divided and the flowers are soft pink with red veins. It is very hardy, down to at least −20 °C (−4 °F) and possibly less.

The cultivar ‘Castle Drogo’ has gained the Royal Horticultural Society's Award of Garden Merit.
