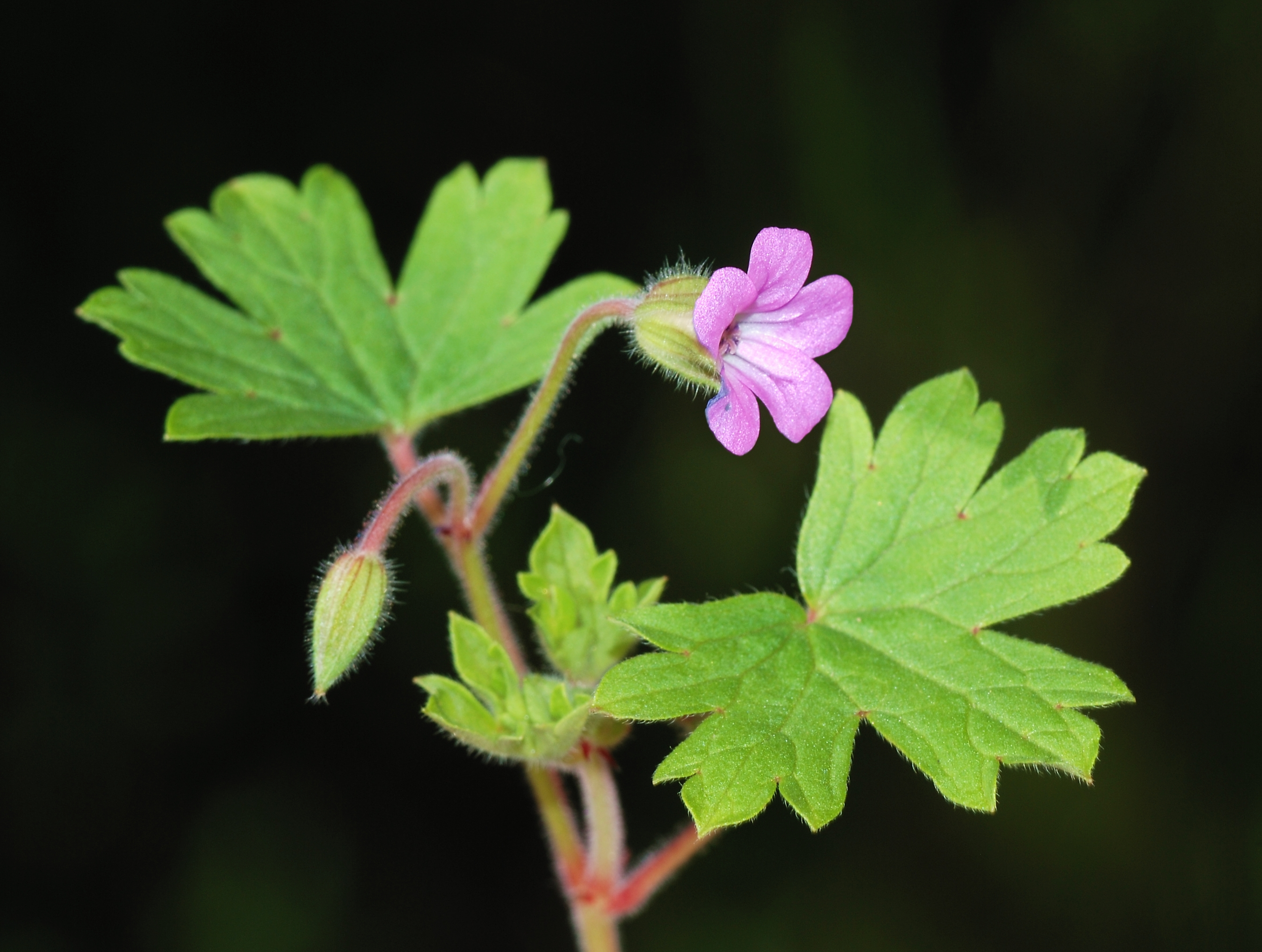
- Geranium rotundifolium

Scientific classification
- Kingdom: Plantae
- Clade: Embryophytes
- Clade: Tracheophytes
- Clade: Spermatophytes
- Clade: Angiosperms
- Clade: Eudicots
- Clade: Rosids
- Order: Geraniales
- Family: Geraniaceae; Juss.

Type genus
- Geranium L.

Genera
- California Aldasoro et al.; Erodium Aiton; Geranium L.; Hypseocharis J. Remy; Monsonia L.; Pelargonium Aiton

= Geraniaceae =

Family of plants

Geraniaceae is a family of flowering plants placed in the order Geraniales. The family name is derived from the genus Geranium. The family includes both the genus Geranium (the cranesbills, or true geraniums) and the garden plants called geraniums, which modern botany classifies as genus Pelargonium, along with other related genera.

The family comprises 830 species in five to seven genera. The largest genera are Geranium (430 species), Pelargonium (280 species) and Erodium (80 species).

== Description ==
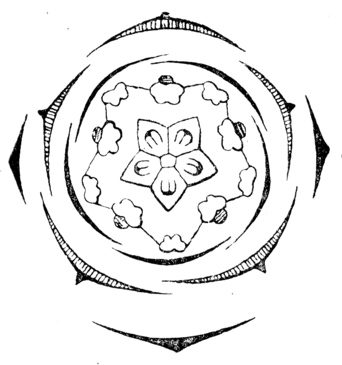
Flower diagram of Geranium pratense

Geraniaceae are herbs or subshrubs. The Sarcocaulon are succulent, but other members of the family generally are not.

Leaves are usually lobed or otherwise divided, sometimes peltate, opposite or alternate and usually have stipules.

The flowers are generally regular, or symmetrical. They are hermaphroditic, actinomorphic (radially symmetrical, like in Geranium) or slightly zygomorphic (with a bilateral symmetry, like in Pelargonium). The calyx and the corolla are both pentamerous (with five lobes), petals and sepals are free and distinct. The androecium consists in two whorls of five stamens each, some of which can be unfertile; the pistil consists of five (less commonly three) merged carpels. The linear stigmas are free, and the ovary is superior. The nectaries are localised at the bases of the antesepalous stamens and are formed by the receptacle. Pelargonium has only one nectary gland on the adaxial side of the flower. It is hidden in a tube-like cavity which is formed by the receptacle. Flower morphology is conserved within Geraniaceae, but there is a large diversity in floral architecture. Flowers are usually grouped in cymes (e.g. in Geranium), umbels (e.g. in Pelargonium) or, more rarely, spikes.

Geraniaceae are normally pollinated by insects, but self-pollination is not uncommon. A number of species are pollinated by the fly Moegistorhynchus longirostris.

The fruit is a unique schizocarp made of five (or three) achenes, in the lower part the achenes are inside the calyx, while the upper part (the stylar beak) is the style of the flower, looking like a kind of long beak over the achenes. When the fruit is mature the style breaks into five (or three) hygroscopically active (ready to absorb water) bristles that curl, causing the achenes to be released.

=== Differences between the genera ===
California lacks filaments without anthers (called staminodes), but the lower half of the five fertile stamens is made much wider by a wing with a rounded top on each side of the narrow higher part of the filament that carries an anther. Geranium only has ten fertile stamens without wings and lacks staminodes, except for G. pusillum that only has five stamens. Monsonia only has fifteen fertile stamens, which are merged at their base into a ring or merged at their base in trios with the middle filament longer than the others, except for M. brevirostrata with only five stamens. Erodium has five staminodes and five fertile stamens, without wings. Pelargonium has ten filaments without wings, between two and seven of which are topped by anthers, while the remaining three to eight are staminodes lacking anthers, but it can easily be distinguished by having only one narrow tube-like nectary inside what looks like the flowerstalk.

== Taxonomy ==
Geraniaceae and Francoaceae are the two families included in the order Geraniales under the Angiosperm Phylogeny Group (APG) classification (APG IV). There has been some uncertainty in the number of genera to be included. Stevens gives seven genera listed here, while Christenhusz and Byng state five genera.

Stevens also lists four synonyms of Geranium: Geraniopsis Chrtek Neurophyllodes (A. Gray) O. Degener Robertianum Picard Robertiella

Hypseocharis, with between one and three species, which comes from the south-west Andean region of South America, is considered the sister to the rest of the family. Some authors separate Hyspeocharis as a monogeneric family Hypseocharitaceae, while older sources placed it in the Oxalidaceae. The genus Rhynchotheca has also been separated into the Francoaceae.

The Geraniaceae have a number of genetic features unique amongst angiosperms, including highly rearranged plastid genomes differing in gene content, order and expansion of the inverted repeat.

=== Phylogeny ===
Recent comparison of DNA-fragments resulted in the following phylogenetic tree.

- - - Hypseocharitaceae
    - Geraniaceae
      - Pelargonium
      - - Monsonia including Sarcocaulon
        - - - California
            - Erodium
          - Geranium

== Distribution and habitat ==
Most species are found in temperate or warm temperate regions, though some are tropical. Pelargonium has its centre for diversity in the Cape region in South Africa, where there is a striking vegetative and floral variation.

== Gallery ==
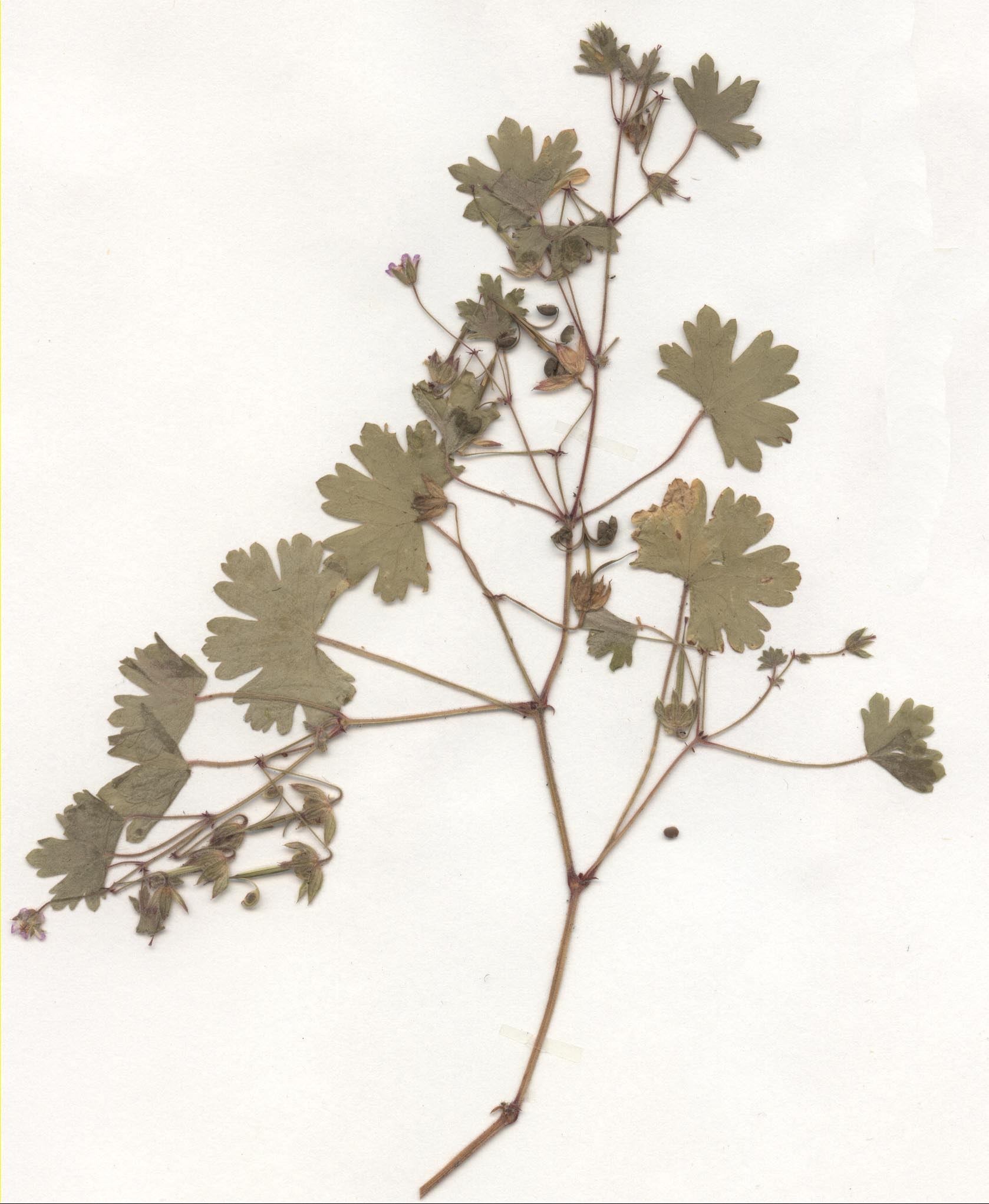
Herbarium specimen of Geranium rotundifolium showing mature fruits

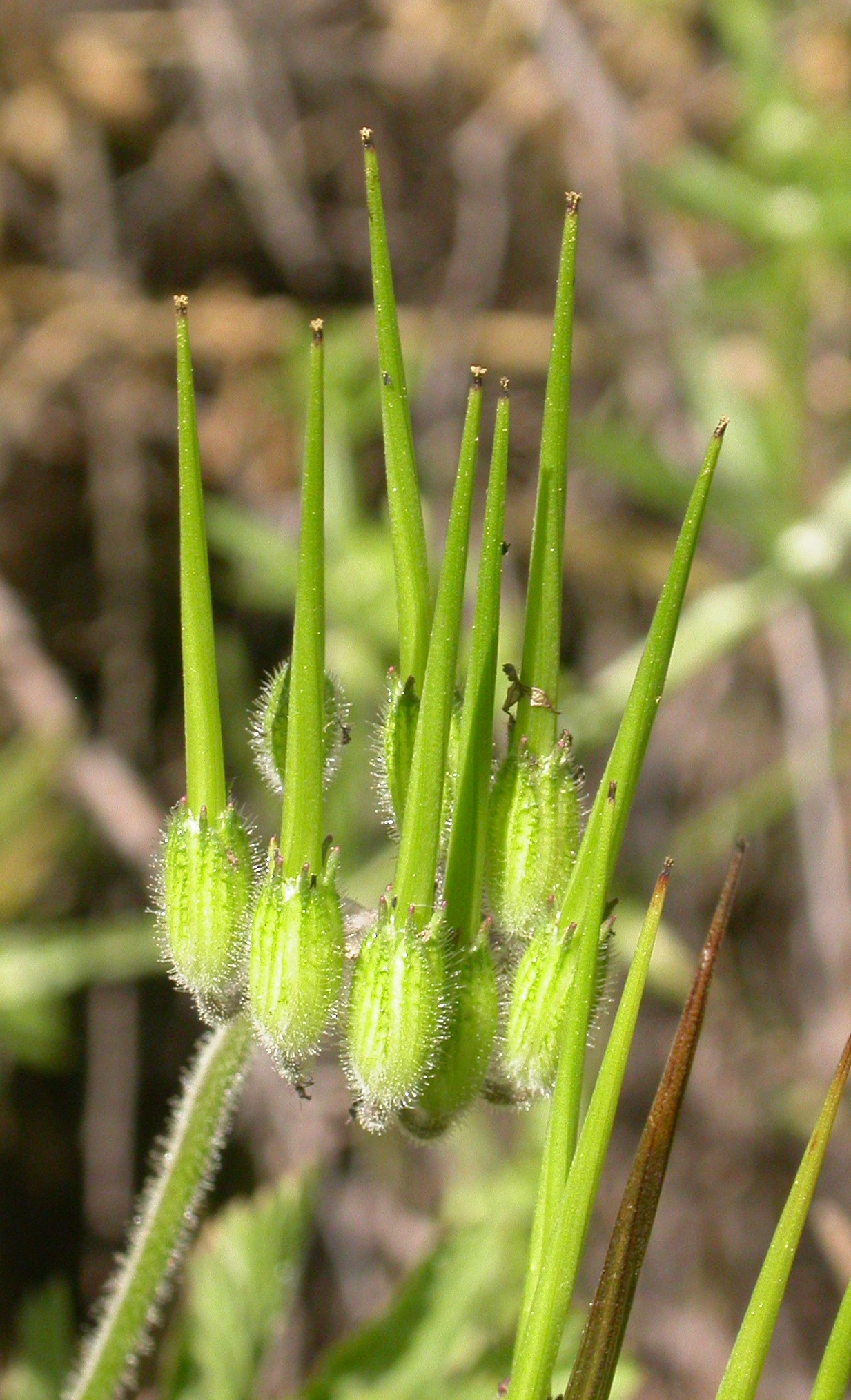
Immature fruits of Erodium botrys

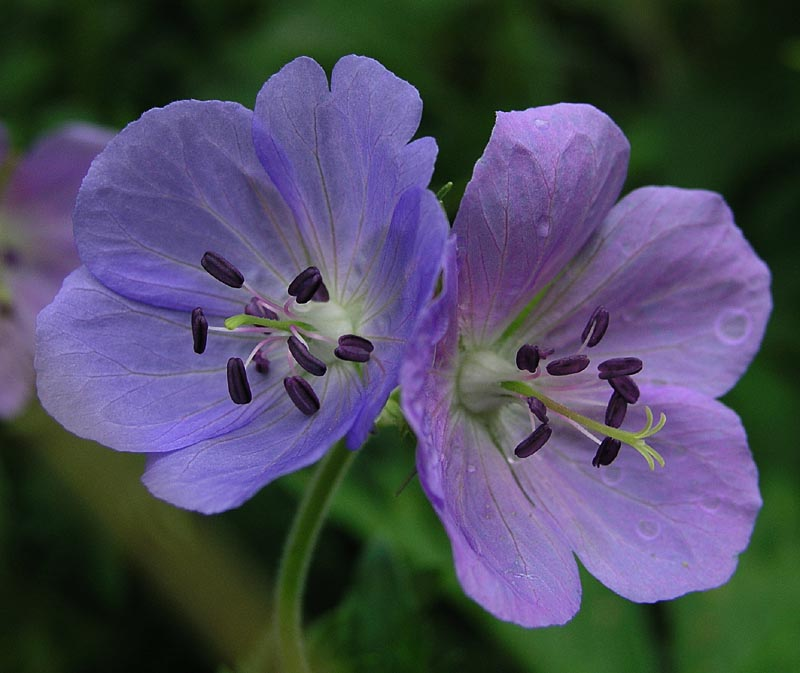
Actinomorphic flowers of Geranium pratense

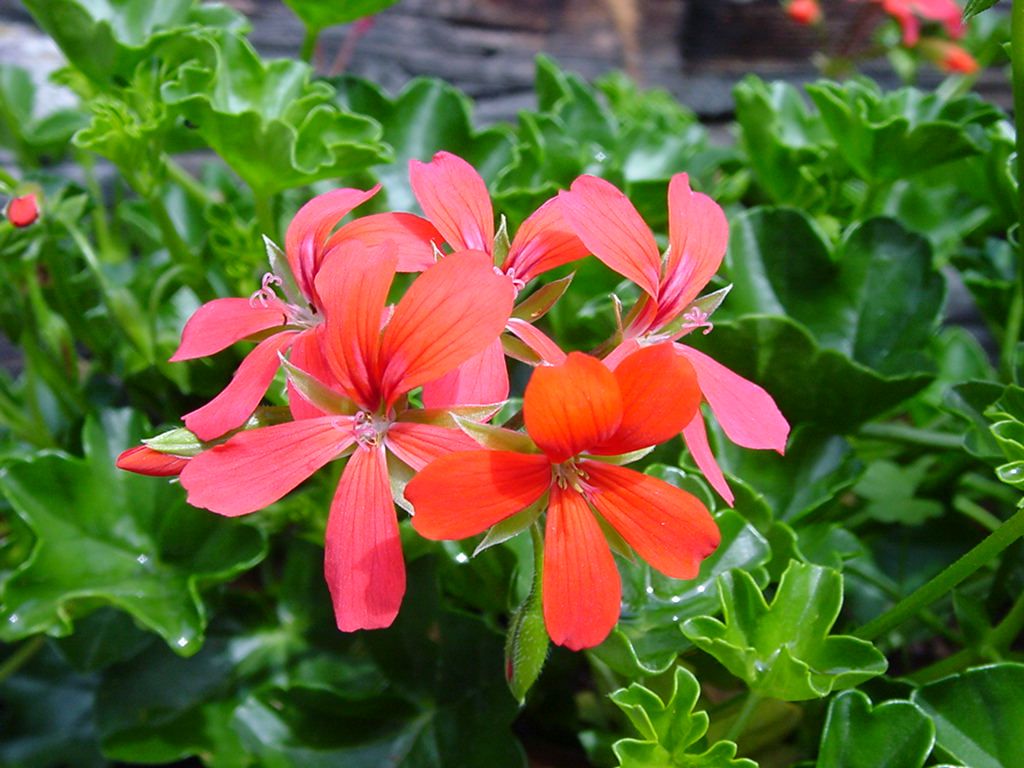
Zygomorphic flowers of a garden geranium (genus Pelargonium)

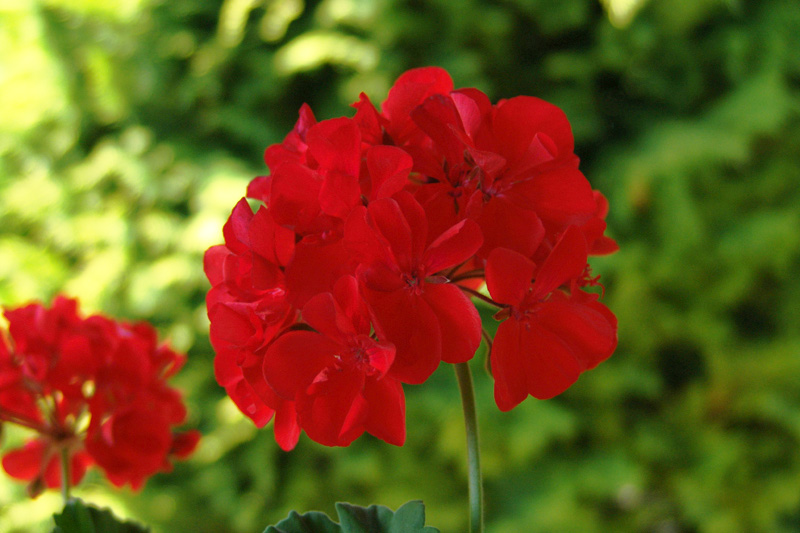
Cultivated Pelargonium umbels

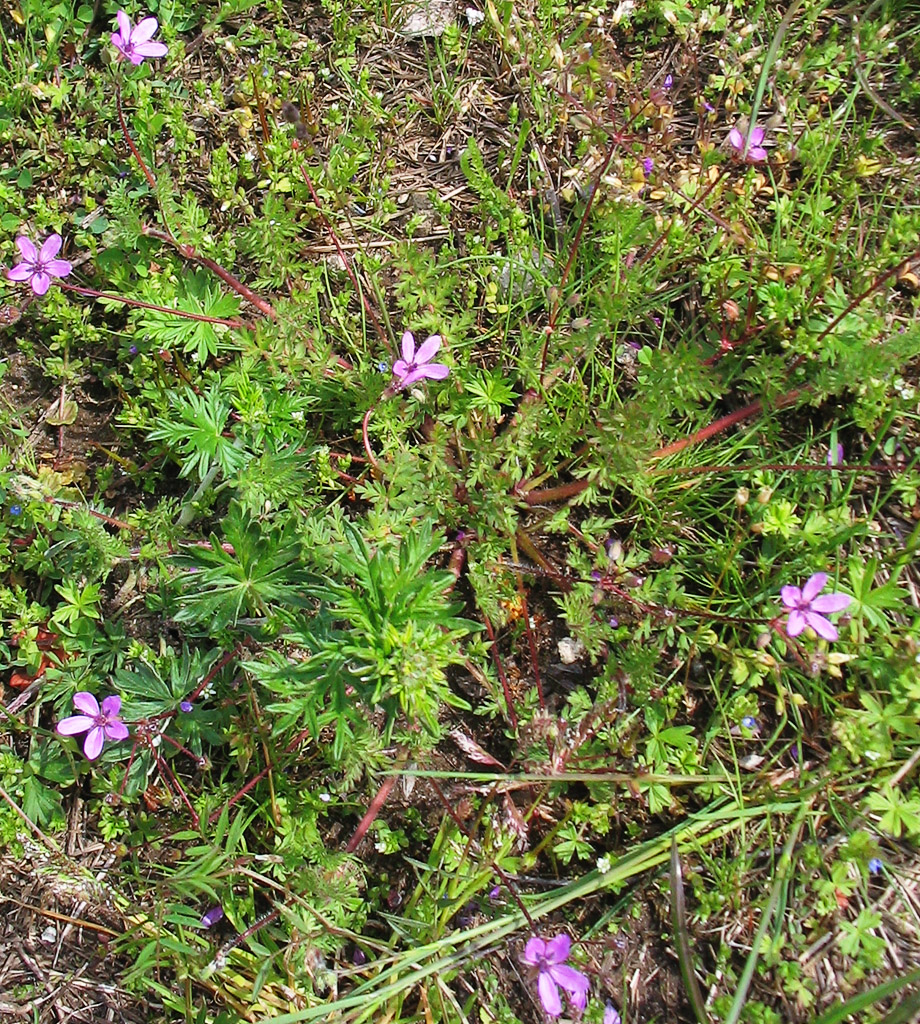
Erodium cicutarium

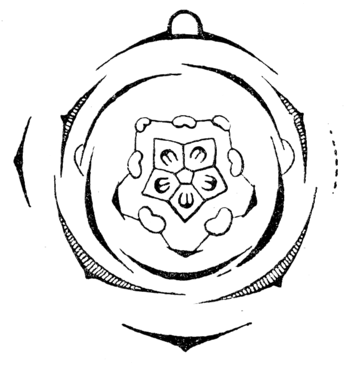
Another flower diagram (Pelargonium zonale, three abortive stamens)

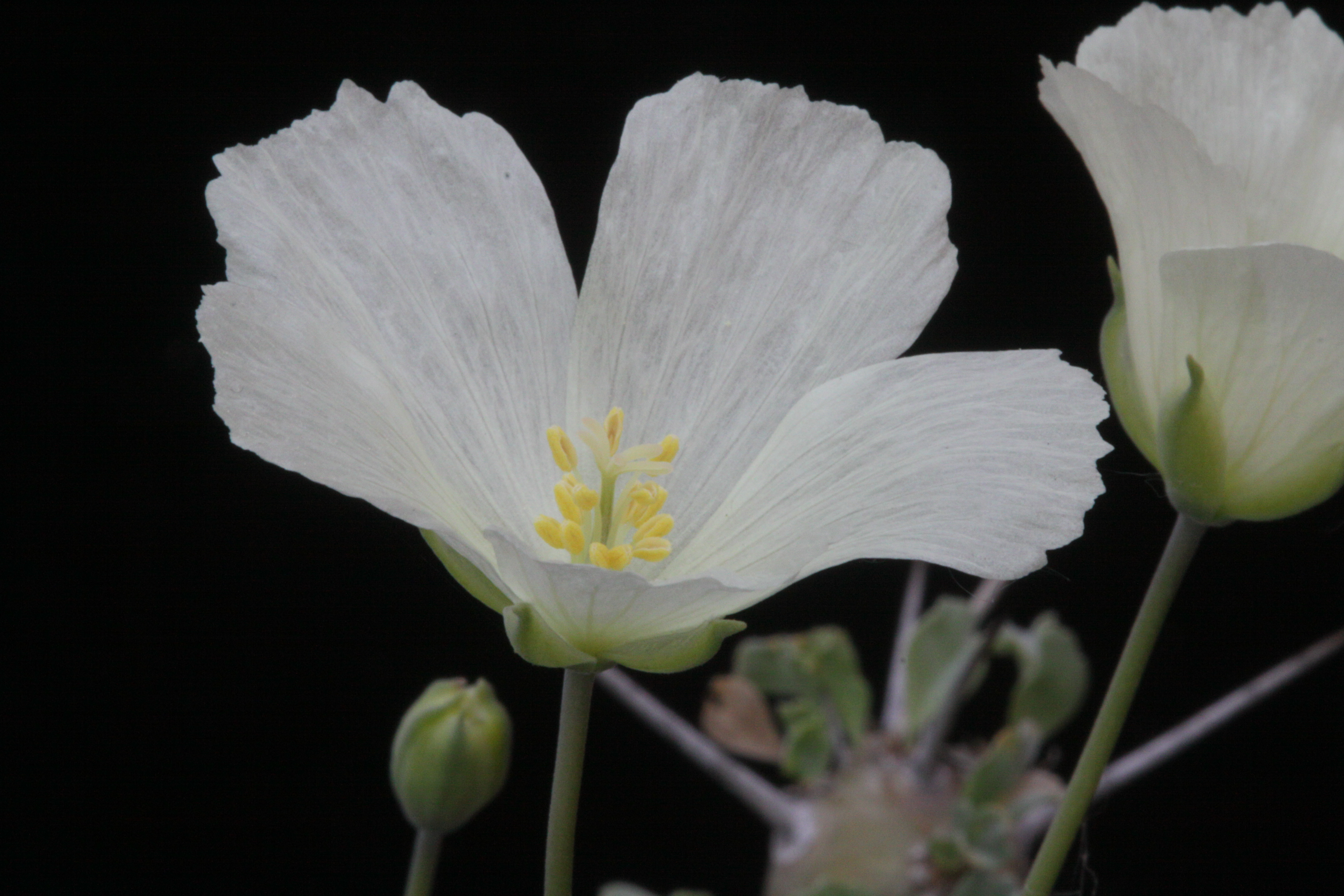
Sarcocaulon crassicaule

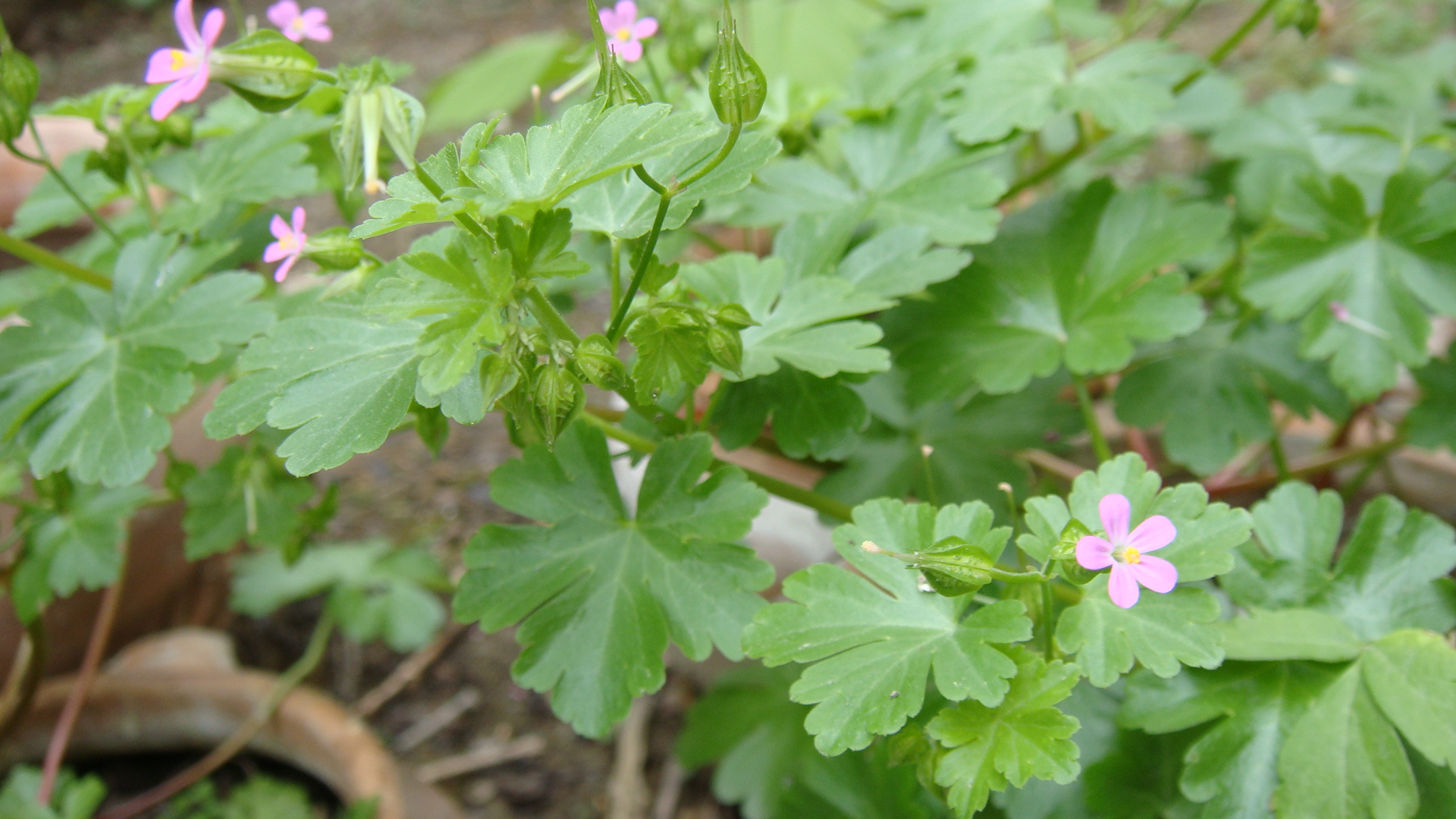
A bush with flowers

== Bibliography ==
- APG IV (2016). "An update of the Angiosperm Phylogeny Group classification for the orders and families of flowering plants: APG IV". Botanical Journal of the Linnean Society. 181 (1): 1–20. doi:10.1111/boj.12385.
- Fiz, Omar; Vargas, Pablo; Alarcón, Marisa; Aedo, Carlos; García, José Luis; Aldasoro, Juan José (1 April 2008). "Phylogeny and Historical Biogeography of Geraniaceae in Relation to Climate Changes and Pollination Ecology" (PDF). Systematic Botany. 33 (2): 326–342. Bibcode:2008SysBo..33..326F. doi:10.1600/036364408784571482. hdl:10261/77646.
- Stevens, P.F. (2016) [2001], Angiosperm Phylogeny Website, Missouri Botanical Garden
- Christenhusz, Maarten JM & Byng, J. W. (2016). "The number of known plants species in the world and its annual increase". Phytotaxa. 261 (3): 201–217. Bibcode:2016Phytx.261..201C. doi:10.11646/phytotaxa.261.3.1.
- Aldasoro, J.J.; Navarro, C.; P. Vargas; Saez, L.; Aedo, C. (2002). "California, a new genus of Geraniaceae endemic to the southwest of North America" (PDF). Anales Jard. Bot. Madrid. 59 (2): 209–216. doi:10.3989/ajbm.2001.v59.i2.128.
- Price, Robert A.; Palmer, Jeffrey D. (1993). "Phylogenetic Relationships of the Geraniaceae and Geraniales from rbcL Sequence Comparisons". Annals of the Missouri Botanical Garden. 80 (3): 661–671. Bibcode:1993AnMBG..80..661P. doi:10.2307/2399852. JSTOR 2399852.
- Pignatti, Sandro (1982). Flora d'Italia (in Italian). Edagricole. ISBN 978-88-506-2310-5.
- Bakker, Freek T.; Culham, Alastair; Hettiarachi, Priyani; Touloumenidou, Tasoula; Gibby, Mary (February 2004). "Phylogeny of Pelargonium (Geraniaceae) Based on DNA Sequences from Three Genomes". Taxon. 53 (1): 17. doi:10.2307/4135485.
