= Cotswold Wildlife Park =

Cotswold Wildlife Park & Gardens
- Interactive map of Cotswold Wildlife Park & Gardens
- 51°46′25″N 1°39′15″W
- Date opened: 1970
- Location: South of Burford, Oxfordshire, England
- Land area: Wildlife Park: 48 acres (0.19 km^{2}), Gardens: 160 acres (0.65 km^{2})
- No. of animals: 1,500+
- No. of species: 250
- Major exhibits: Walled Garden, Madagascar, Woodland Walk, Reptile House, Bat House, Invertebrate House, Tropical House
- Website: cotswoldwildlifepark.co.uk

Cotswold Wildlife Park & Gardens is home to more than 1,500 animals from 250 different species, making it one of the largest zoological collections in the United Kingdom. Other attractions at the Park include a narrow gauge railway and the Skymaze adventure playground. The Park is set in 160 acres (0.65 km^{2}) of landscaped parkland and gardens near the Cotswold town of Burford in Oxfordshire, England. It welcomed over 577,811 visitors in 2025, a new Park record.

== Animal exhibits ==
=== Walled Garden ===
The high walls of the Manor House's former kitchen garden provide a sheltered setting for many plants and animals from warmer climates. Set amongst flower beds and ornamental trees are exhibits for a variety of small mammals and birds. Mammals in the Walled Garden include meerkats, tamanduas, yellow mongooses, prairie dogs, Asian small-clawed otters, squirrel monkeys and crowned sifakas. Birds include penguins, hornbills, storks and other waders. At the Humboldt penguins exhibit, keeper talks and penguin feeds are held twice daily. The Walled Garden is also home to The Tropical House, a glasshouse with exotic plants, free-roaming sloths and tropical birds such as great blue turacos, Bali starlings and bleeding heart pigeons.

=== Madagascar ===
Opened in 2008, Madagascar is a walk-through exhibit which draws attention to the plight of endangered lemur species. The mixed exhibit features ring-tailed lemurs, crowned lemurs and red-bellied lemurs. Madagascar teal and radiated tortoise are also on show, and were brought into the collection especially for Madagascar. The breeding record of the lemur collection is very good with the ring-tailed lemurs giving birth regularly since their introduction in 2009, and the red-bellied lemurs also having bred successfully. Lemur feeding and talk is held daily at noon.

=== Woodland Walk ===
The wooded area to the north west of the Park houses a number of larger animal species from South America including Brazilian tapir, capybara, Patagonian maras and giant anteaters, as well as Visayan warty pigs. Other enclosures in the Woodland Walk house Canadian timber wolves, white-naped cranes and parma wallabies. The entrance to the Woodland Walk is via a bridge over the lake, which has a wide variety of ducks and Chilean flamingos.

=== Paddocks and Big Cats ===
The moated paddocks to the south west of the Manor House are home to a group of giraffe, a herd of Chapman's zebra, a group of ostriches and breeding groups of white rhinoceros and Bactrian camels. To the south of the rhinoceros paddock are the Park's big cat enclosures, home to clouded leopards and Asiatic lions. A new lion house was opened in 2023. The nearby Little Africa exhibit houses a collection of smaller animals from the African continent, including Kirk's dik-dik, naked mole rats, dwarf mongooses and Cape porcupine.

=== Reptile House, Bat House and Invertebrate House ===
The Park's collections of reptiles, bats and invertebrates are house in converted stable blocks behind the Manor House. The Reptile House is home to species such as black mambas, crocodile monitors, bearded dragons, poison dart frogs, and rhinoceros iguanas. The reticulated pythons, and anacondas are particularly large specimens. The park achieved the first UK breeding for Morelet's crocodiles in 2007, with 12 eggs hatching successfully. The Invertebrate House is home to leaf-cutter ants, scorpions and tarantulas and other species. The Bat House holds Seba's short-tailed bats and Egyptian fruit bats. Turkish spiny mice are in the Reptile Courtyard and nearby is an enclosure for siamangs.

=== Children's farmyard ===
The farmyard allows children to have close encounters with domesticated animals such as donkeys, goats and guinea pigs. The Park offers educational sessions where families can learn about and feed the animals. The farmyard is located on the north side of the Park.

=== Around the Manor House ===
Next to the 600-year-old oak tree outside the orangery is an exhibit for red pandas. In front of the Manor House, next to the rhino paddock, is the Aldabra giant tortoise enclosure. Behind the House is the Skymaze adventure playground - newly refurbished in 2026 - and a picnic area and restaurant.

=== Around the railway station ===
Animal enclosures near the railway station include aviaries for a variety of owls and birds of prey, such as the great grey owl, snowy owl, and turkey vulture. Next to the railway station entrance is the wolverine enclosure. The Park are one of the only European collections to breed wolverines in captivity, with breeding successes in 2012 and 2018. Other exhibits house black-and-white colobus, Pallas's cats and emus.

List of animals

Birds

- African openbill
- African sacred ibis
- Bali starling
- Black stork
- Black-cheeked lovebird
- Blue-throated piping guan
- Burrowing owl
- Chilean flamingo
- Common ostrich
- Emu
- Great bustard
- Great grey owl
- Green aracari
- Helmeted guineafowl
- Humboldt penguin
- King vulture
- Madagascan teal
- Mandarin duck
- Northern white-faced owl
- Pied avocet
- Purple swamphen
- Rüppell's griffon vulture
- Scarlet ibis
- Snowy owl
- Southern cassowary
- Striated caracara
- Tawny frogmouth
- White stork
- White-browed coucal
- White-faced whistling duck
- White-naped crane
- Wrinkled hornbill

Mammals

- African crested porcupine
- African pygmy goat
- Asian small-clawed otter
- Asiatic lion
- Bactrian camel
- Belted black-and-white ruffed lemur
- Binturong
- Black-tailed prairie dog
- Brazilian tapir
- Capybara
- Chapman's zebra
- Clouded leopard
- Common squirrel monkey
- Crowned sifaka
- Eastern black-and-white colobus
- Egyptian fruit bat
- Emperor tamarin
- Eurasian wolf
- Giant anteater
- Giraffe
- Greater bamboo lemur
- Grey mouse lemur
- Linne's two-toed sloth
- Llama
- Meerkat
- Miniature donkey
- Naked mole-rat
- Oxford Sandy and Black pig
- Pallas's cat
- Parma wallaby
- Patagonian mara
- Pygmy marmoset
- Red panda
- Reindeer
- Ring-tailed lemur
- Shetland pony
- Siamang
- Six-banded armadillo
- Southern tamandua
- Southern white rhinoceros
- Wolverine
- Yellow mongoose

Reptiles

- Aldabra giant tortoise
- Chinese crocodile lizard
- Cuvier's dwarf caiman
- Eyelash viper
- Fiji banded iguana
- Frilled lizard
- Green anaconda
- Green tree python
- Radiated tortoise
- Reticulated python
- Rhinoceros ratsnake
- Utila spiny-tailed iguana
- Western Gaboon viper
- Yacare caiman
- Yellow-margined box turtle

Amphibians

- Borneo eared frog
- Cinnamon frog
- Coronated tree frog
- Mexican giant leaf frog
- Tonkin bug-eyed frog

== History ==
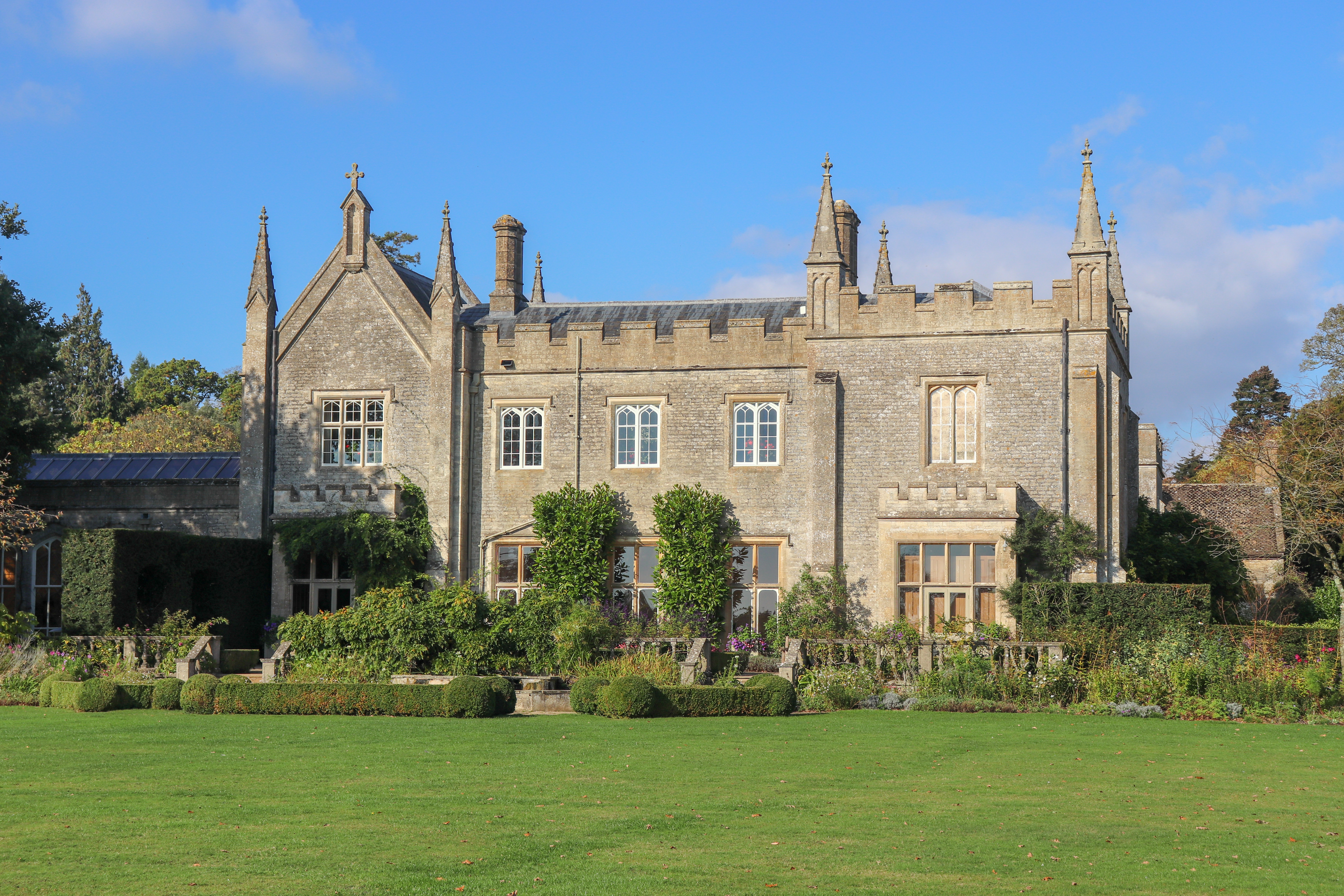
The Georgian-Gothic manor house

In 1804 the estate's owner William Hervey had the current manor house called Bradwell Grove Manor House designed by William Atkinson and built by Richard Pace of Lechlade, in the then-fashionable Georgian Gothic style. This followed the example of Strawberry Hill, Horace Walpole's masterpiece at Twickenham. The house replaced an original 17th-century Jacobean residence, part of which was incorporated into the north service wing.

In 1923 the house and estate were purchased by Colonel Heyworth-Savage, and on his death when killed in action in North Africa on 28 December 1941 the estate was passed to his grandson John Heyworth. John Heyworth was born in the manor house on 21 August 1925 and when he left school he served from 1943 to 1947 in the Royal Dragoons, the regiment which had been commanded by his father. The house was rented out for twenty years to Oxford Regional Hospital Board, until in 1969 John Heyworth decided to open the gardens to the public, and since 1970 the house has been the heart of the Wildlife Park. John Heyworth died on 24 November 2012, and now the managing director is his son Reggie Heyworth.

The Walled Garden was originally a kitchen garden, the area now houses the marmosets and tamarins, contained cold fruit frames full of parma violets and other delicate plants, and on the site of the gardeners' greenhouse stood two structures reputed to be the oldest greenhouses in Oxfordshire. The Tropical House has taken the place of three adjoining greenhouses, the first for carnations, the second for rare hot-house plants and a fig tree, and the third for nectarines and peaches. The water supply for the Walled Garden came from a central well now covered over but still marked. There was a cricket pitch on what is now the grass car park, and two grass tennis courts outside the drawing room and brass-rubbing room. Many years ago, there was even a private nine-hole golf course covering what is now the ostrich enclosure and surrounding area.

The manor house now has various roles, with its many rooms being used as visitor areas. The old dining room – still with its original curtains, panelling and fireplace – has become the brass-rubbing centre; the drawing room is used for meetings, exhibitions and conferences; the library is now a bar area; the original kitchen has been turned into a storeroom and a self-contained flat; and other rooms are used as administration and maintenance offices, storerooms and staff accommodation. Even the maze of cellars is used for hibernating certain species from the reptile collection. The old stables and other out-buildings now the reptile and bat houses, classrooms, offices and the quarantine area. The billiard room is now the restaurant kitchen, and its billiard table was turned into the lower tier of the waterfall in the penguin enclosure.

== Railway ==
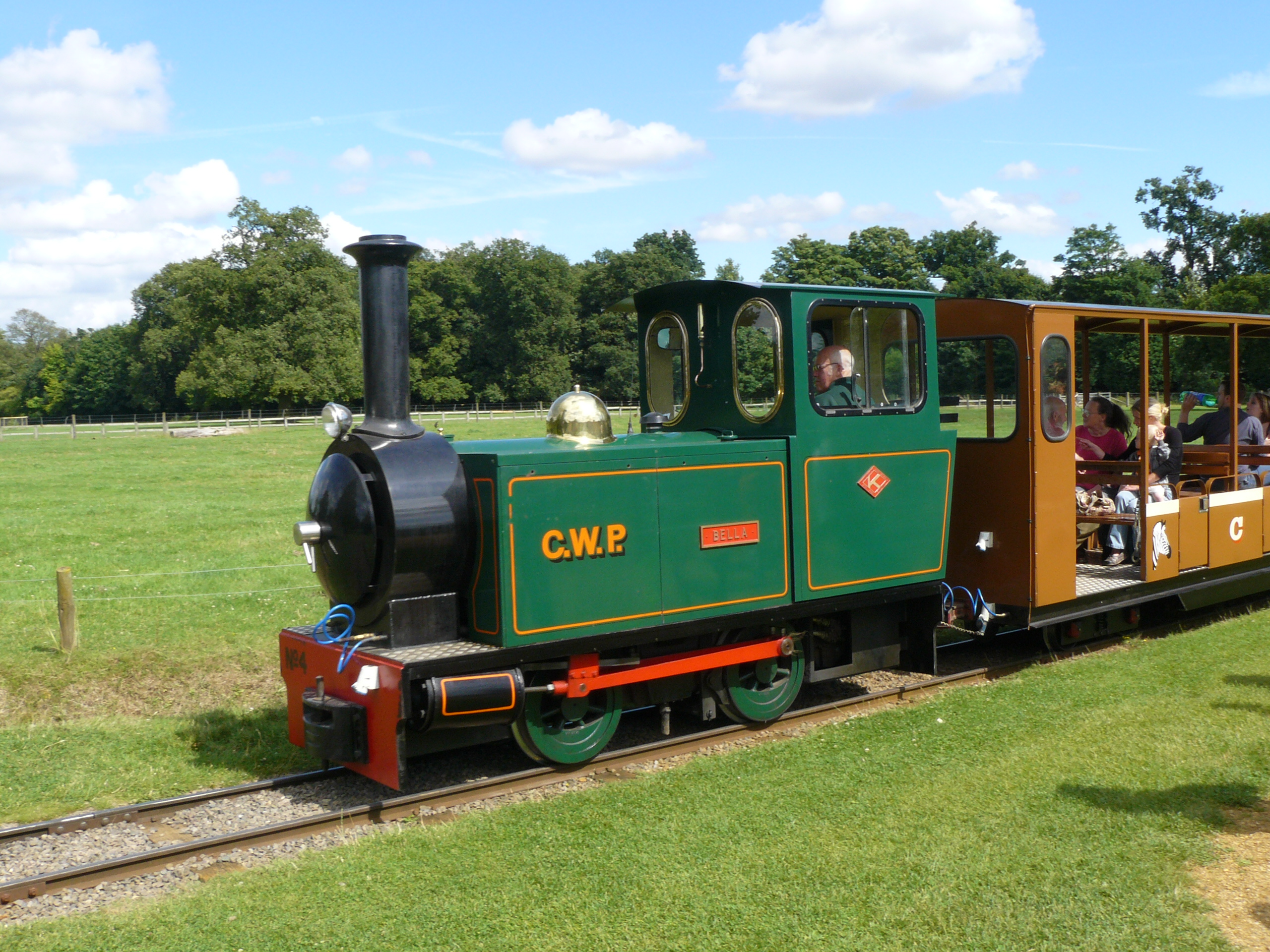
The narrow gauge railway. Locomotive 4 Bella in service.

The Cotswold Wildlife Park Railway (CWP) is a 2 ft (610 mm) narrow gauge railway operating around the wildlife park. Journeys begin and end at Bradwell Grove Station, located on the edge of the woods between the owl aviaries and the Walled Garden, which is equipped with wooden platforms (one each for boarding and alighting passengers), two large waiting shelters, a staff room, and a large booking office. Tickets for train travel are purchased separately from park admission tickets.

=== History ===
Construction of the railway began in 1974, with the end-to-end line arranged in a horseshoe shape from the current station round the manor house to a second station beside the giant tortoise enclosure. It opened officially on 27 April 1975, with the first passengers carried following an opening ceremony by Dr Desmond Morris.

The original locomotive was a red-liveried steam-outline four-wheel diesel engine. Passengers travelled in bogie carriages of over-sized width, with transverse bench seating, clerestory roofs, and end balconies for loading; the carriages were painted in a two-tone livery of beige and cream.

The coaches were replaced with new vehicles supplied by Alan Keef Ltd, maintaining the original beige livery, with a cream relief band. These new coaches were subsequently upgraded, with new doors. Four coaches are in service - a 20 seat saloon, two with 16 seats and a guard’s compartment, and one with 16 seats plus a wheelchair accessible compartment.

The line was extended and upgraded from 2006-2007, with the track extended between the two stations to complete the circuit, and Bradwell Grove Station extensively rebuilt. The station and the extended line were officially opened by the local MP, the Rt. Hon. David Cameron, on 5 May 2007.

=== Locomotives ===
All four locomotives to have operated on the line have been diesel powered, but with steam outline (S/O) appearance, to resemble steam engines. The livery for locomotives, originally red, is currently dark green.

Number	Name	Builder	Date built	Type	Status	Notes
1	Beaver	Ruston & Hornsby	1940 (CWP from 1974)	4wDM S/O	Sold. In New Zealand since 1984.	R&H #202969. View image.
2	Oliver	Motor Rail (Simplex)	1953 (CWP from 1977)	4wDM S/O	Sold. At BWLR since 2010, now named Bicknor.	Motor Rail #9869.
3	Otis	Alan Keef Ltd	1985 (Built new for CWP)	0-4-0DH S/O	Operational.	Refurbished 2023. View image.
4	Bella	Alan Keef Ltd	2003 (Built new for CWP)	0-4-0DH S/O	Operational.	Primary engine. View image.

The locomotive Beaver was originally built during World War II for the United Kingdom Ministry of Supply and used to operate trains transporting ammunition on gun ranges and airfields. It was sold in the 1970s and was re-bodied with a steam outline, subsequently serving at Cotswold Wildlife Park from 1974. The engine was withdrawn and sold through Alan Keef Ltd, moving to New Zealand in 1984. The rebuilt engine is still in service, and since 2012 has been at the Blenheim Riverside Railway on South Island, New Zealand.

The locomotive Oliver was originally supplied to the Great Ouse River Authority, Ely, in 1953, where it operated until 1977. The Simplex was then rebodied with a steam outline and named Oliver for use at Cotswold Wildlife Park. The engine eventually fell into disrepair, and arrived at the Bredgar and Wormshill Light Railway in 2010, where it has been restored to original condition and renamed Bicknor.

The engine Otis was built for Cotswold Wildlife Park Railway (the first purpose-built locomotive) by Alan Keen Ltd in 1985. It returned to the builder in 2023 for a major overhaul, including the replacement of the diesel engine and transmission, and remains in service.

The primary engine is called Bella in memory of one of the original pair of white rhinos at the park, Bella and Bull, which arrived in 1972 from the Umfolozi Game reserve in South Africa. The engine was built by Alan Keef Ltd in 2003, and remains in service, though the dome has been reduced in height.

== Park and gardens ==
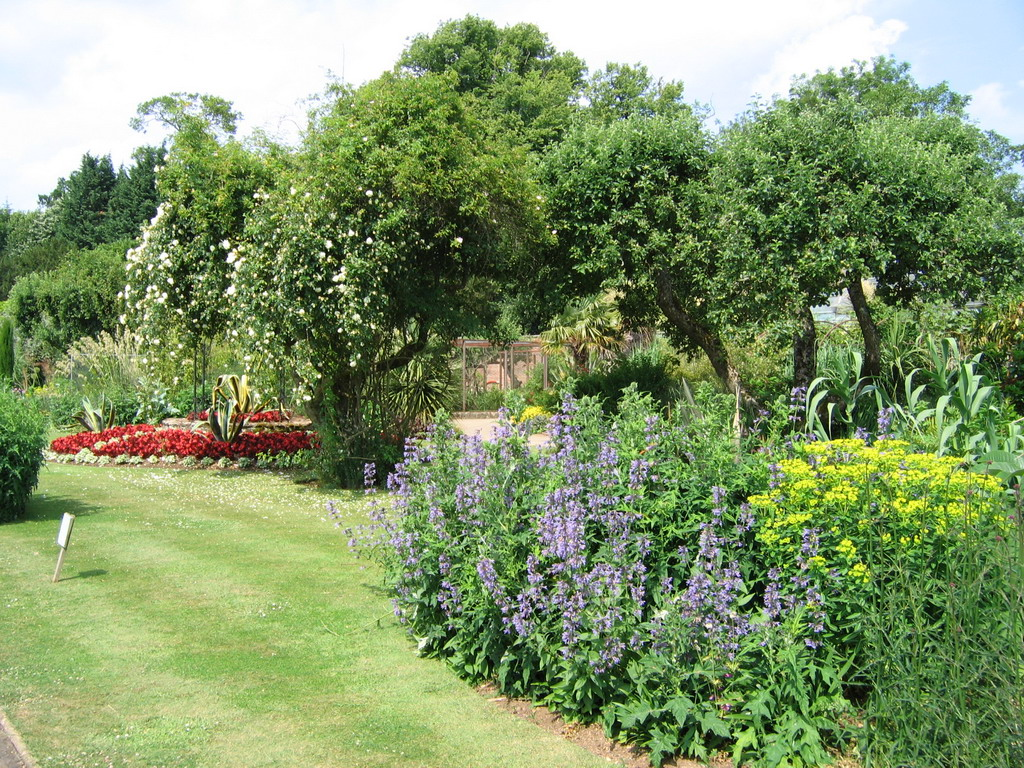
Gardens

The park is well known for its exotic planting, particularly in the favourable micro-climate of the Walled Garden, where bananas and cannas are a speciality. There is a huge pair of Californian redwood trees, imposing tree ferns and giant rhubarb with unusual foliage.

The exotic birds and animals are complemented by flamboyant planting schemes. The South Terrace has been given a period feel, although in fact the terrace, balustrade and pond were constructed in 1989, thanks to a generous legacy from a regular visitor to the park, Miss Daisy Louise Eley. By contrast, the planting around the West Terrace, in front of and around the restaurant is more contemporary. In May the front of the restaurant is draped in wisteria flowers. The 'Winter Garden', between the owls and the siamang gibbons is planted with a wide range of perennials, bulbs and woody plants with an emphasis on providing interest in winter.

Bamboo is a particular favourite at the park, with over fifty varieties planted. They are cut regularly for browse for the animals. The bamboo grows well here because of regular mulching of rhino manure. There is prairie-style planting around the rhino paddock to echo the African plains. The remains of a huge cedar of Lebanon in the Adventure Playground now supports the children's tree house and slide.

== Conservation ==
As of October 2006, the Cotswold Wildlife Park holds 40 species, which are part of either an ESB (European Studbook) or EEP (European Endangered Species Programme). It is the studbook holder for the red-crested turaco and Mount Omei babbler. In addition, both the crested pigeon and blue-winged kookaburra are monitored species. In August 2015, the park announced that a second white rhinoceros had been born at the park.

== Gallery ==
All photographs were taken in the park.

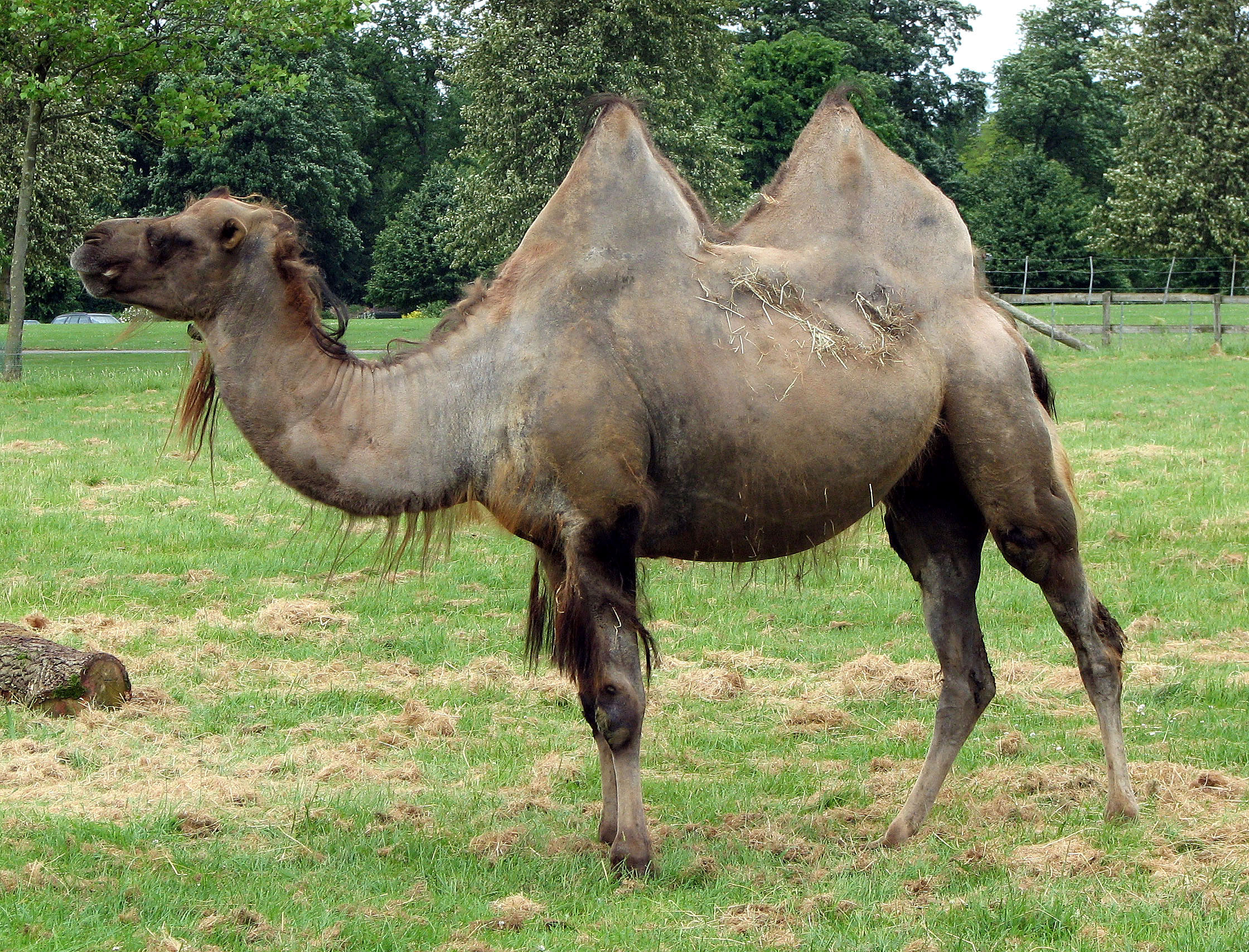
Bactrian camel (Camelus bactrianus)

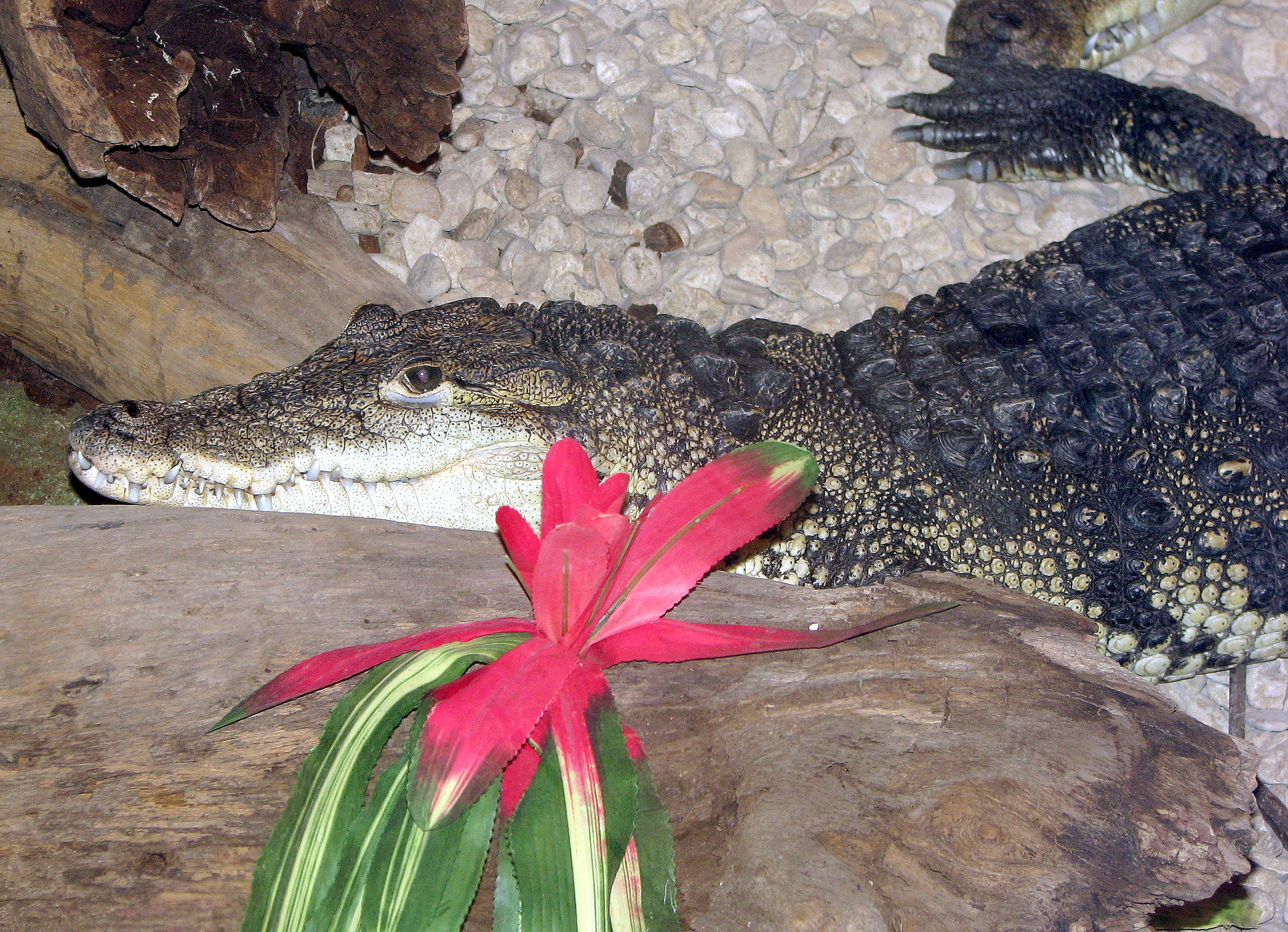
Morelet's crocodile (Crocodylus moreletii)

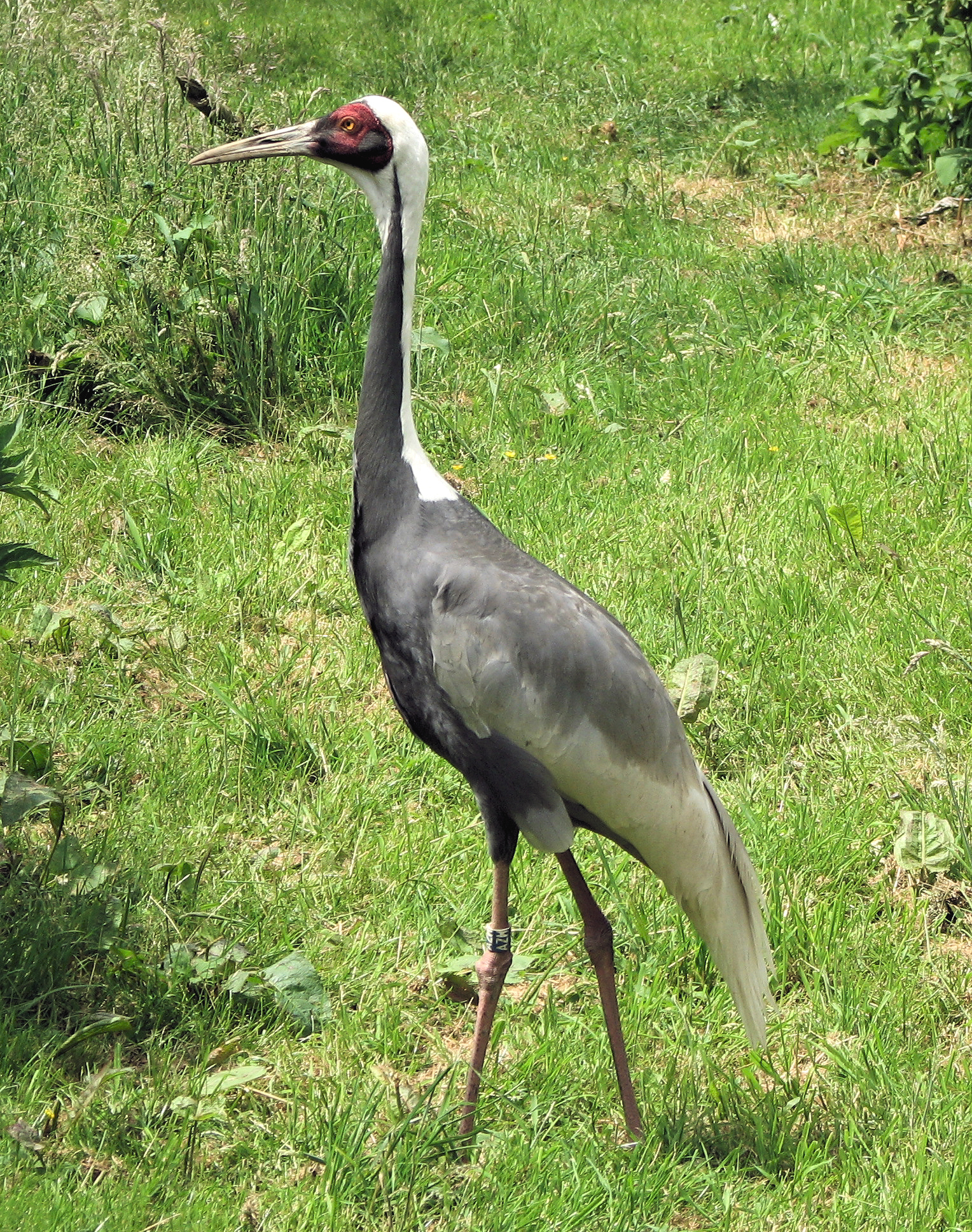
White-naped crane (Grus vipio)

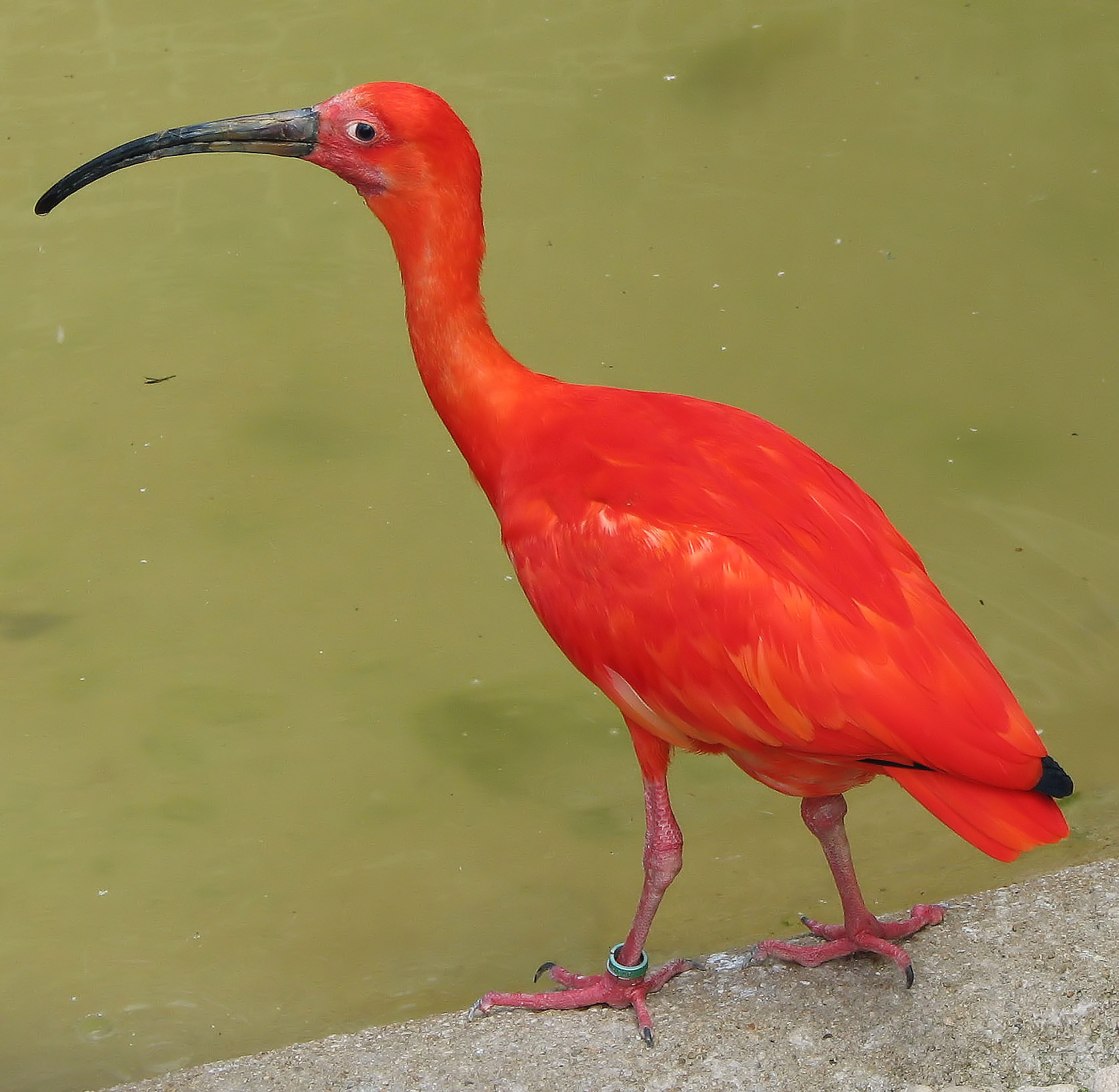
Scarlet ibis (Eudocimus ruber)

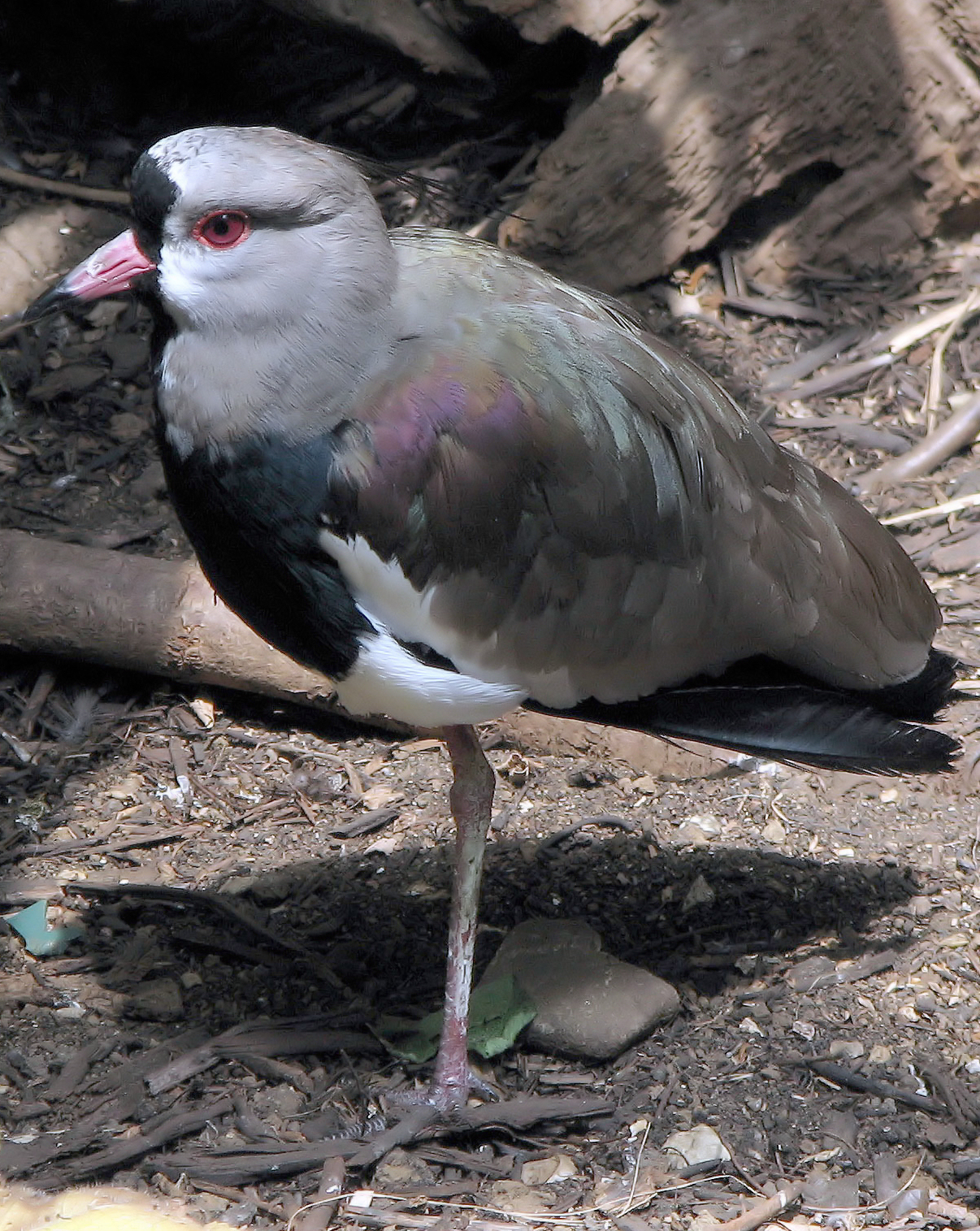
Southern lapwing (Vanellus chinensis)

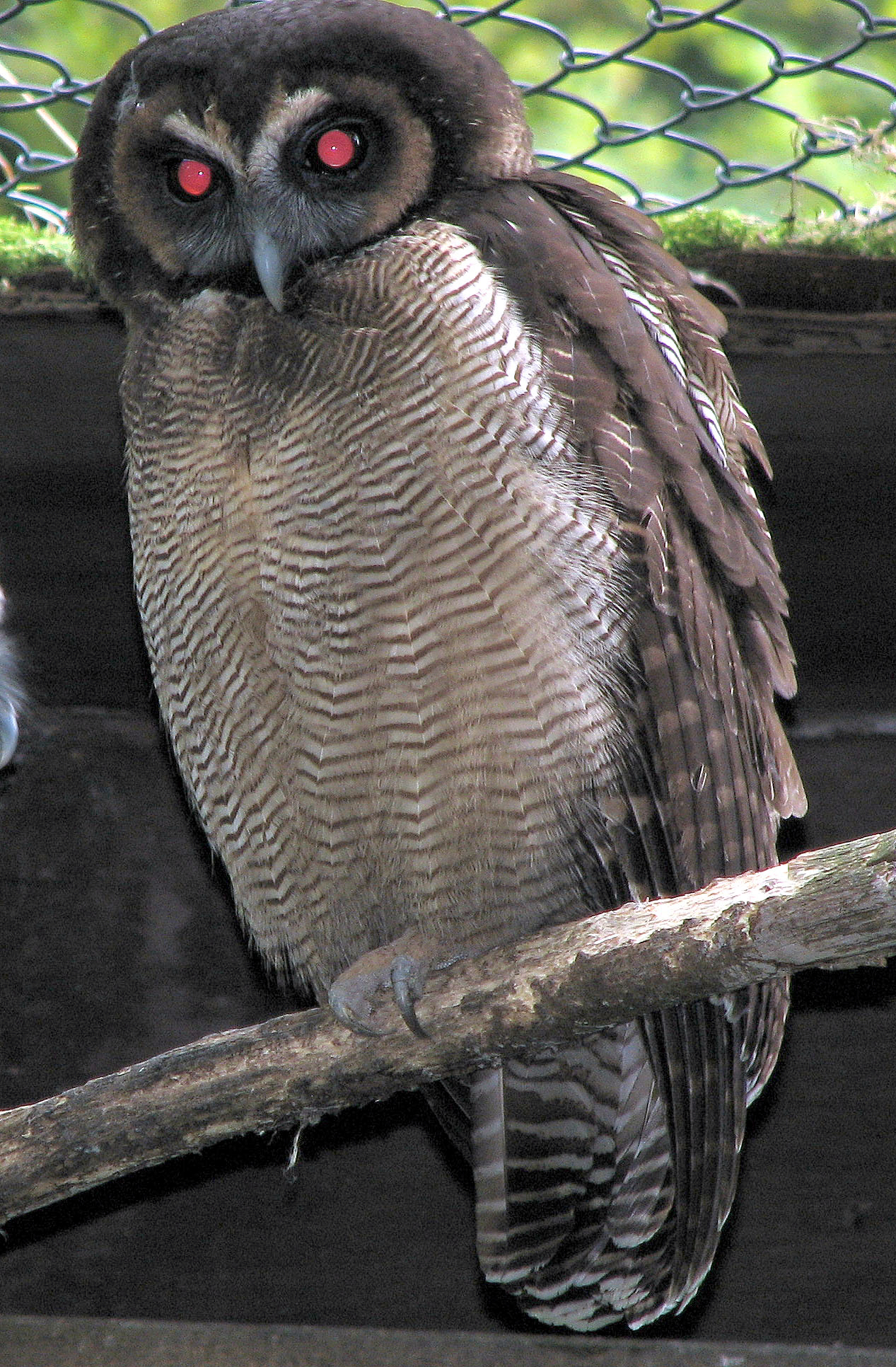
Brown wood-owl (Strix leptogrammica)

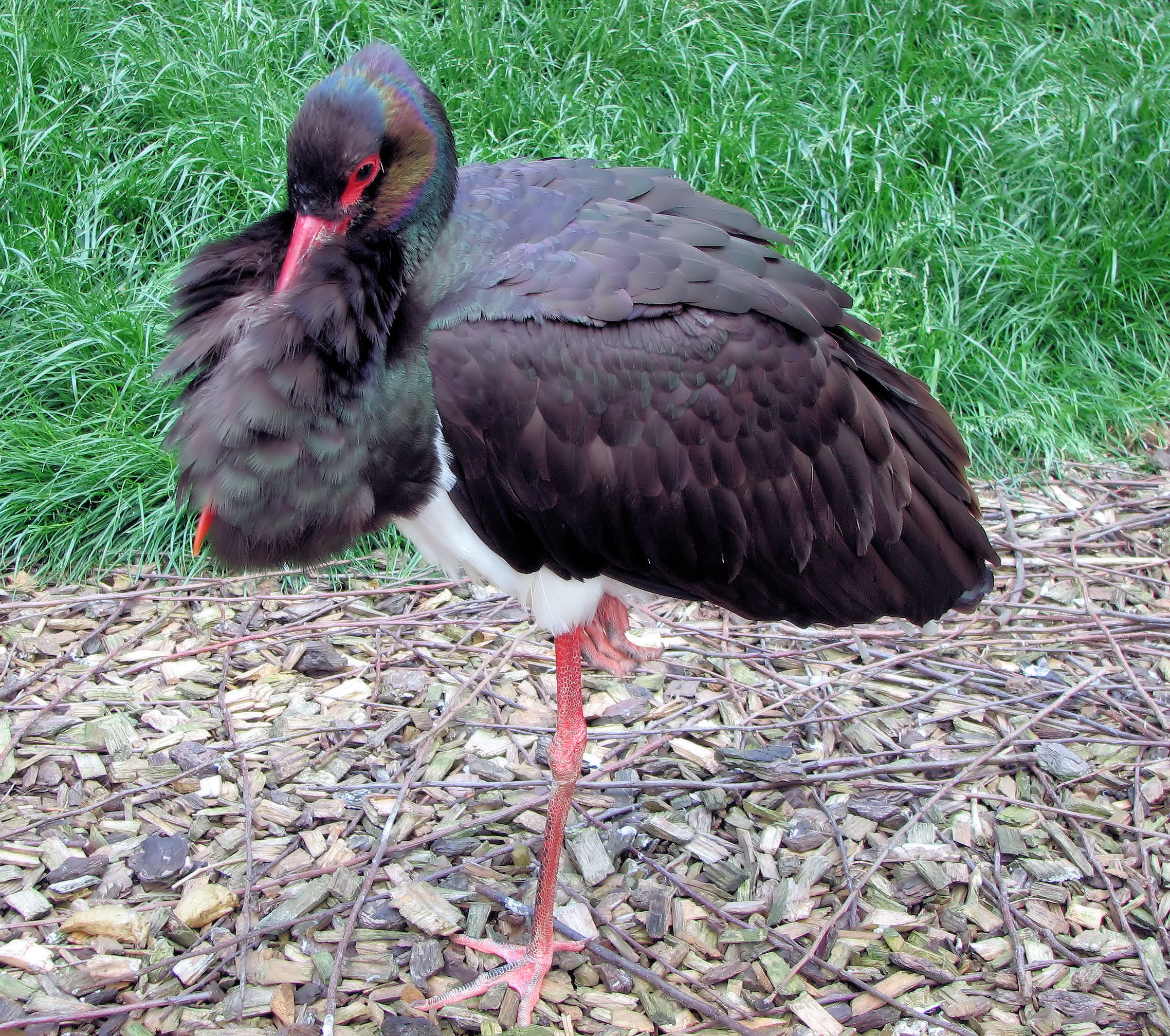
Black stork (Ciconia nigra)

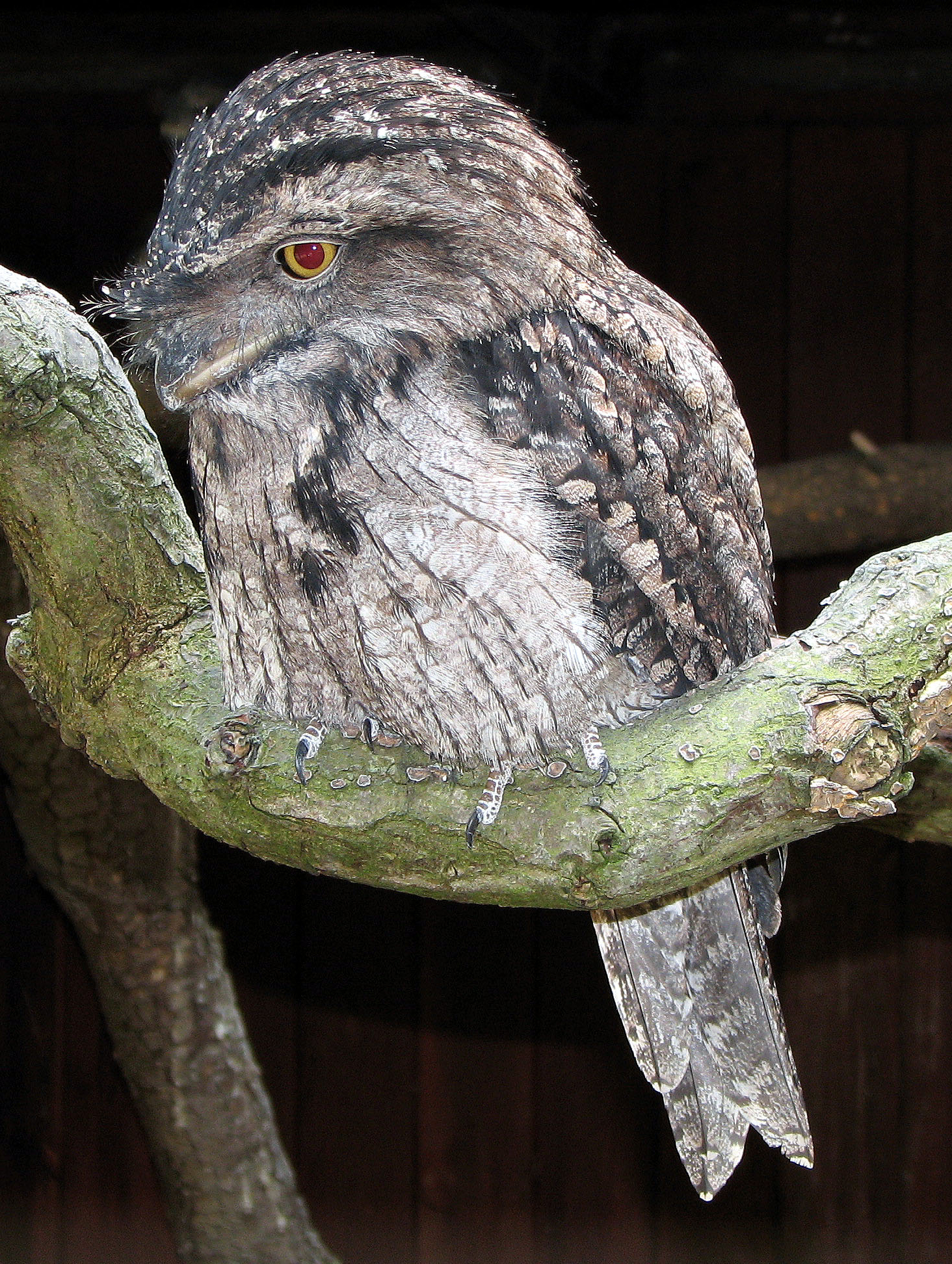
Tawny frogmouth (Podargus strigoides)
