= Jardin Jungle Karlostachys =

Jungle park and botanical garden in Eu, Normandy, France

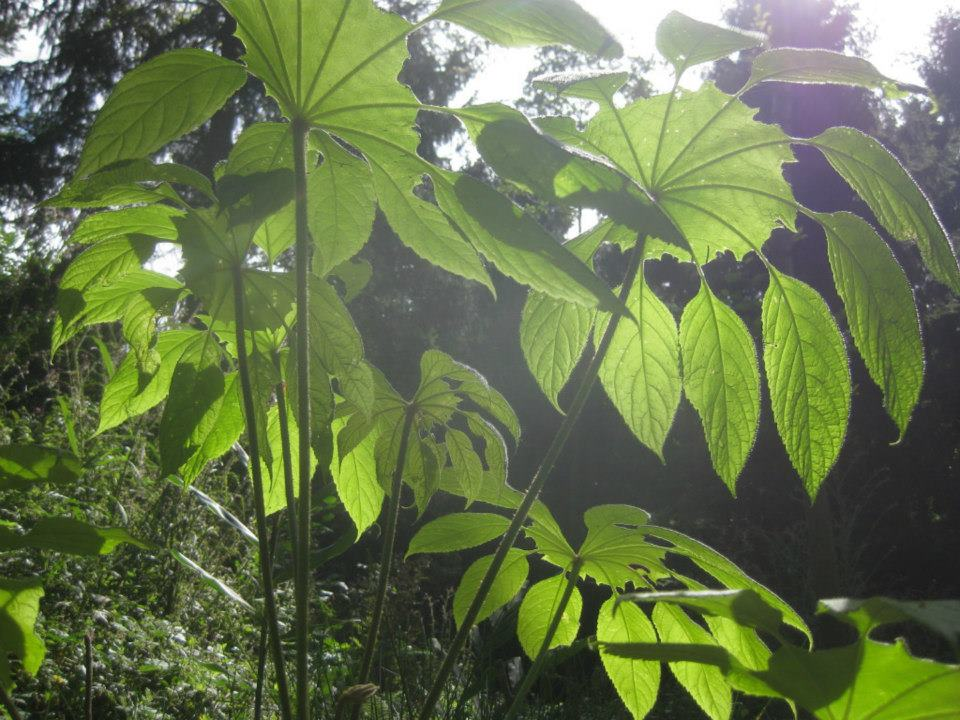
- Brassaiopsis mitis leaves in the garden
- Type: Botanical garden
- Location: Seine-Maritime/France
- Nearest town: Eu
- Coordinates: 50°01′32″N 1°27′03″E
- Area: 15 hectare
- Owned by: Charles Boulanger
- Website: le Jardin Jungle

The Karlostachys Jungle Garden, or Jardin Jungle Karlostachys, is a jungle park and botanical garden in Eu, in the department of Seine-Maritime in Normandy, in northern France. The garden is owned by Charles Boulanger, who has opened it to the public for guided tours by appointment. The first tours took place in 2012. The garden covers an area of 15 hectares, including both the botanical collection, local vegetation and a small nursery for rare species. It is set in a wild forest environment that includes the preservation of local fauna and flora.

== Location ==
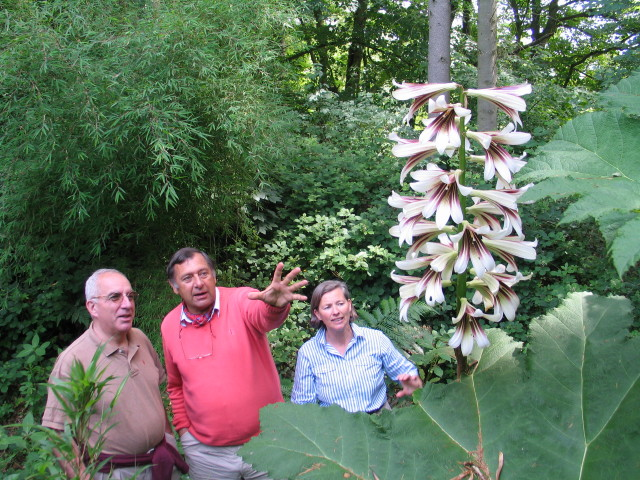
Cardiocrinum giganteum var. yunnanense

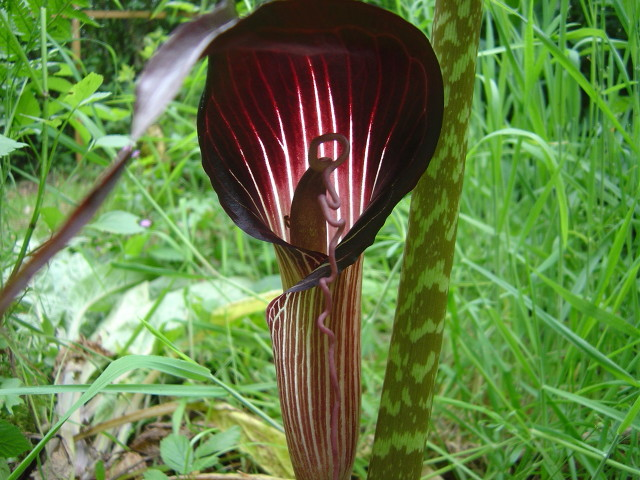
Arisaema speciosum

The garden is located between Normandy and Picardy near Eu, Le Tréport and Mers-les-Bains, near the Eu forest. It is on the road to Beaumont Farm and the archaeological site of Bois l'Abbé.

The Jungle Garden is divided into three parts: the Arboretum that combines collections of rare trees (Bretschneidera, Cathaya, Sequoia or Fitzroya), a bamboo garden, a walled garden containing collections (Hydrangea, Rhododendron, vines, and introductions) and a Eucalyptus plantation of ecotypes selected for their resistance to cold climates.

== Plant species ==
The Jungle garden contains thousands of different plant species on an area of five hectares. It holds a collection of Sequoia, a bamboo plantation where more than 300 species and cultivars of bamboo coexist: giant plants over 13 meters high, climbing, red, blue, black, striped, checked, speckled, modest clustering forms (caespitose) and many rare: Yushania pauciramificans, Indosasa gigantea (Acidosasa gigantea), Oligostachyum sulcatum, Fargesia KR 6791 (a clustering form growing up to 13 meters).

More than 7,000 species have been identified in the park. In the spring season there are abundant flowers, with the cyclamens, bluebells, hellebores, Epimedium, Rhododendron and others. In summer it is the turn of the hydrangeas, and the giant bamboos make their entrance, shooting up over 10 meters in just two weeks. Then comes the autumn with the orange of the beeches and the blue of the Eucalyptus beside the dark green color of the bambo and the yellow of tulip trees and Kalopanax.

== Philosophy ==
About the Karlostachys Jungle Garden, Charles Boulanger states: "My goal is to recreate the spirit of the jungle, introducing species from other countries that are able to withstand our climate."

He voluntarily maintains as many natural areas as possible. These include beehives, brambles (to preserve mammal inhabitants, such as the hazel dormouse), old decaying trees, ivy populations, bindweed and wild clematis. No pesticides, artificial nutrients, insecticides or fungicides are used in the garden. A conservation management system is in place not only to protect the local biodiversity, but to introduce and encourage the growth of cultivated plants. Gardeners do not disturb the natural species when they prune, nor do they clear weeds. Nettles are left to feed the many species of butterflies.

== Plant gallery ==
Some plants at the Jungle Garden

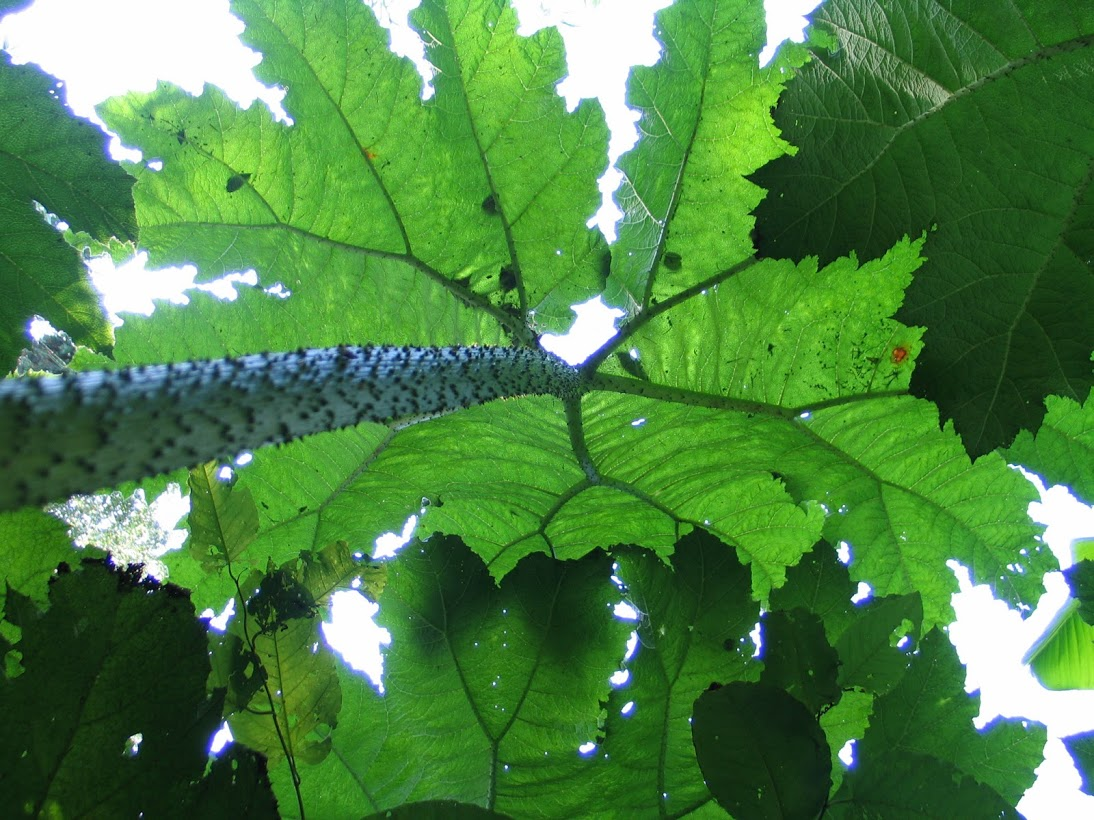
Gunnera × cryptica

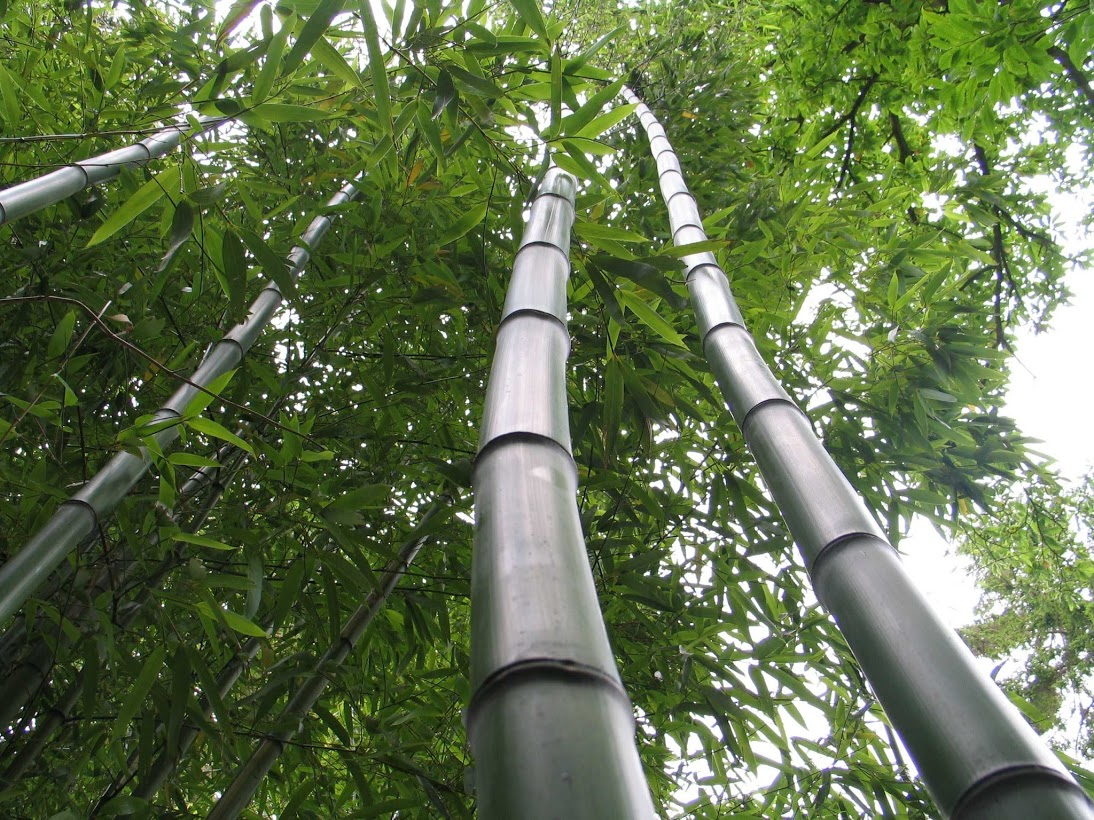
Giant bamboo

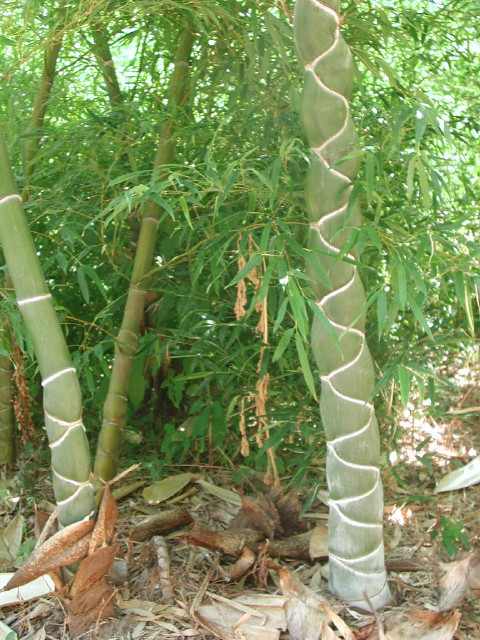
Phyllostachys edulis 'Kikko'

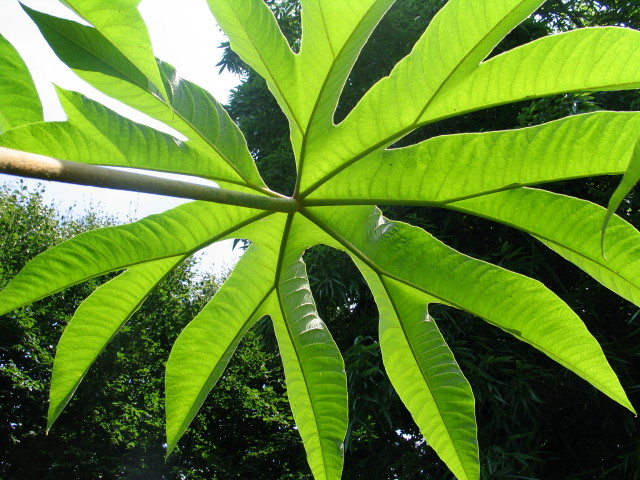
Tetrapanax papyrifer

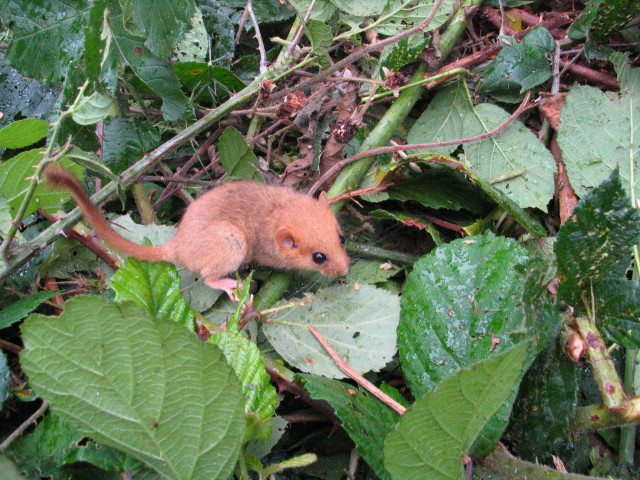
Hazel dormouse (Muscardinus avellanarius) in the garden

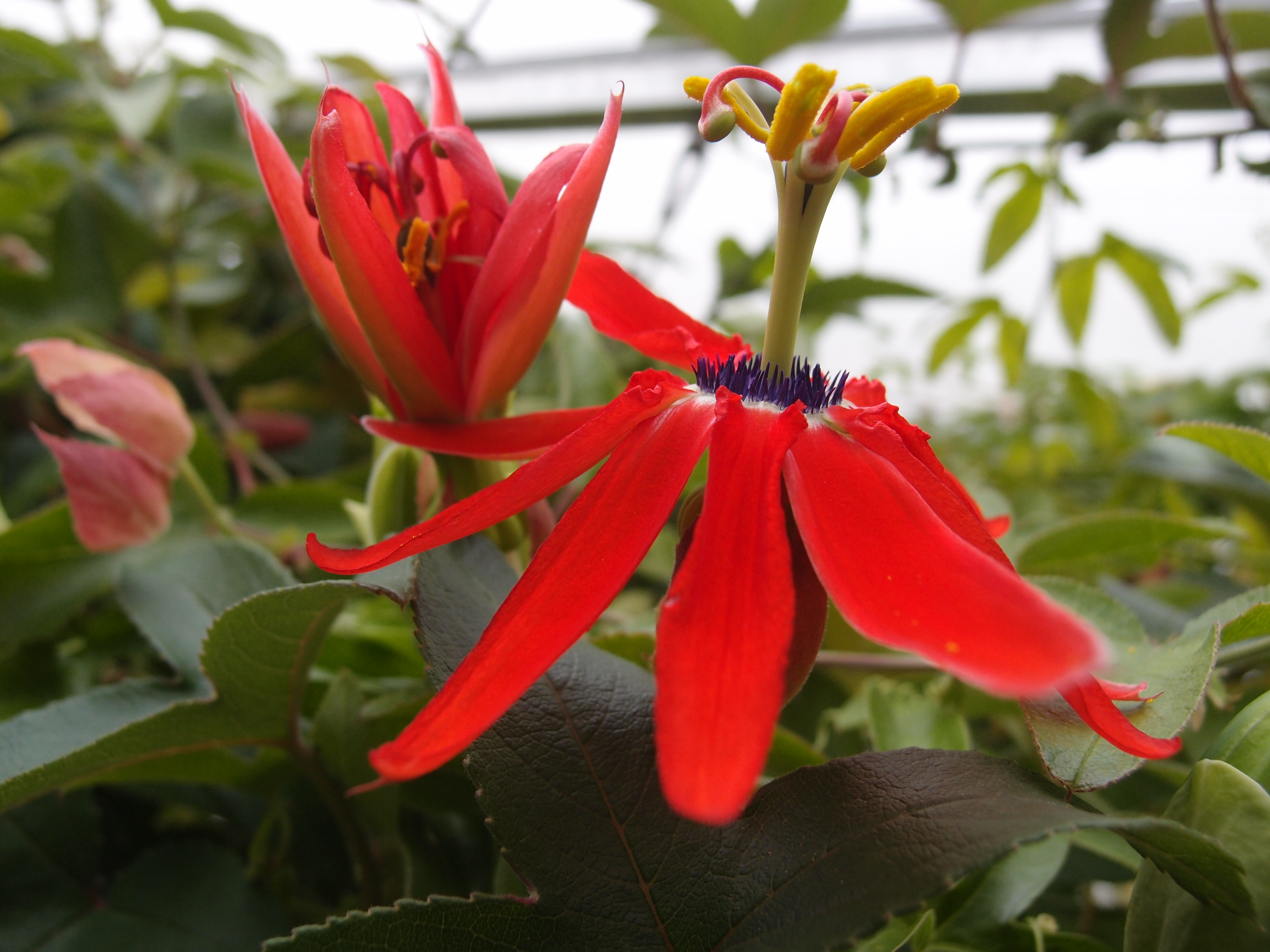
Passiflora manicata in greenhouses

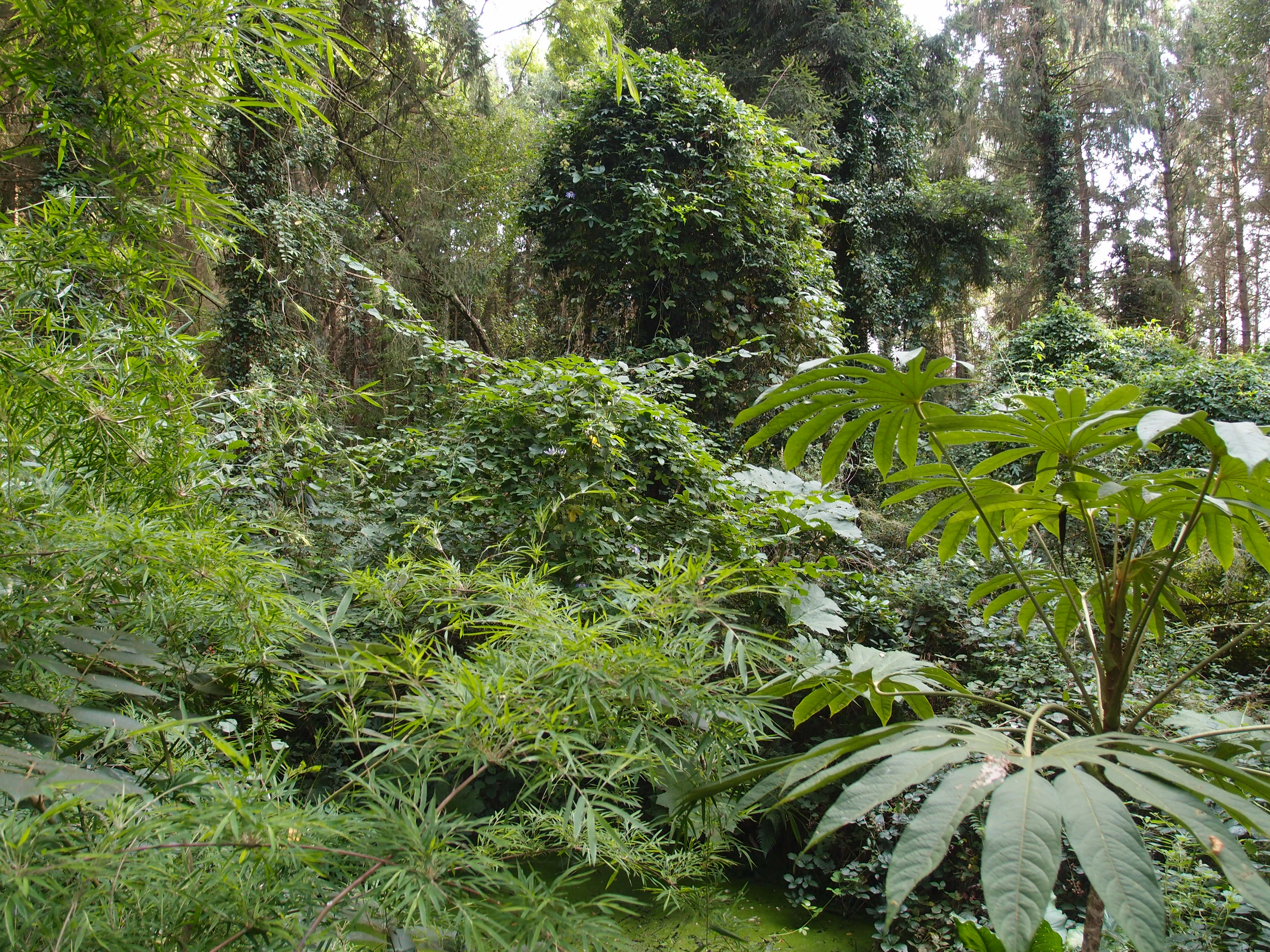
Plant proliferation in the jungle garden

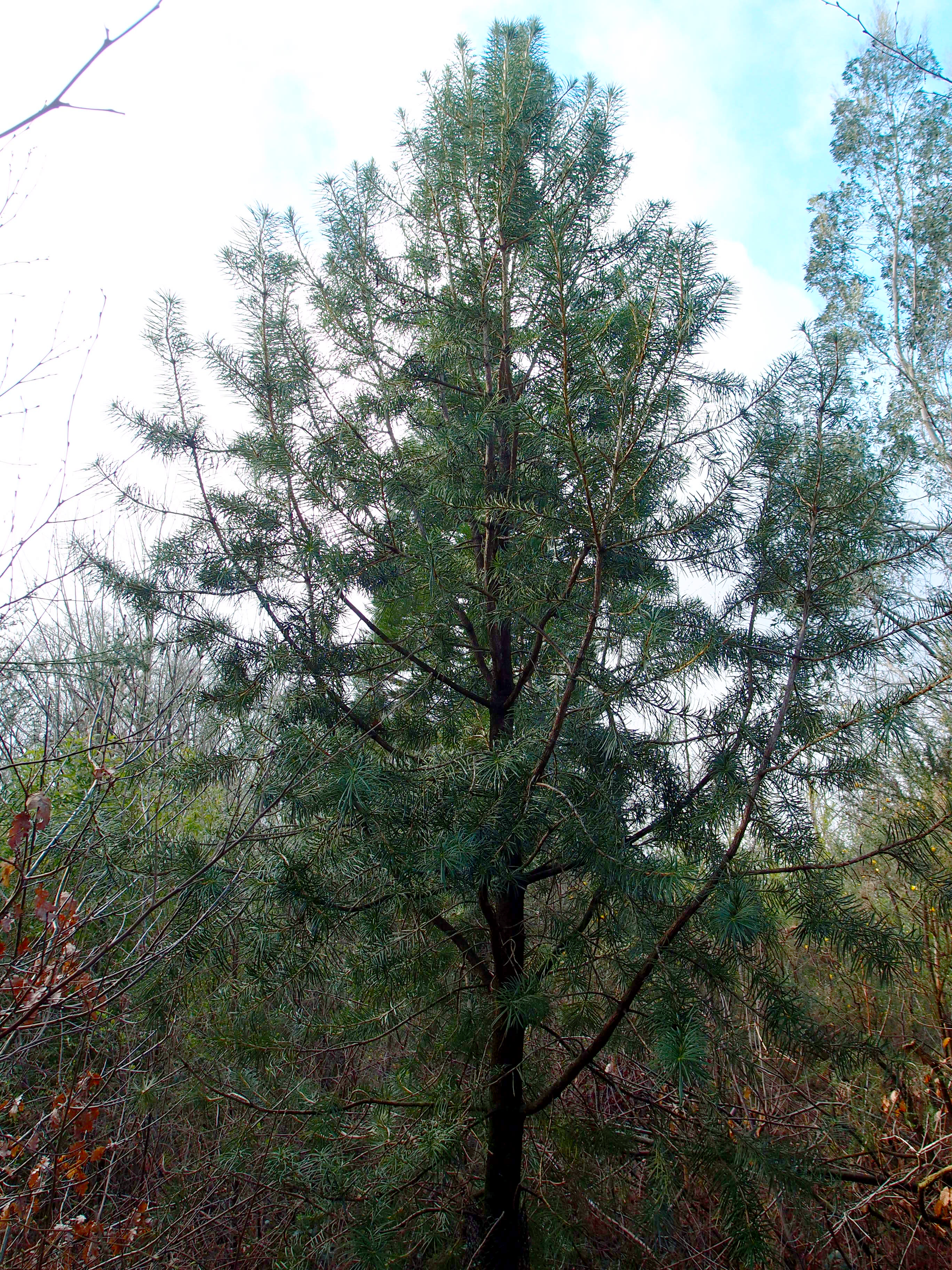
Cathaya argyrophylla

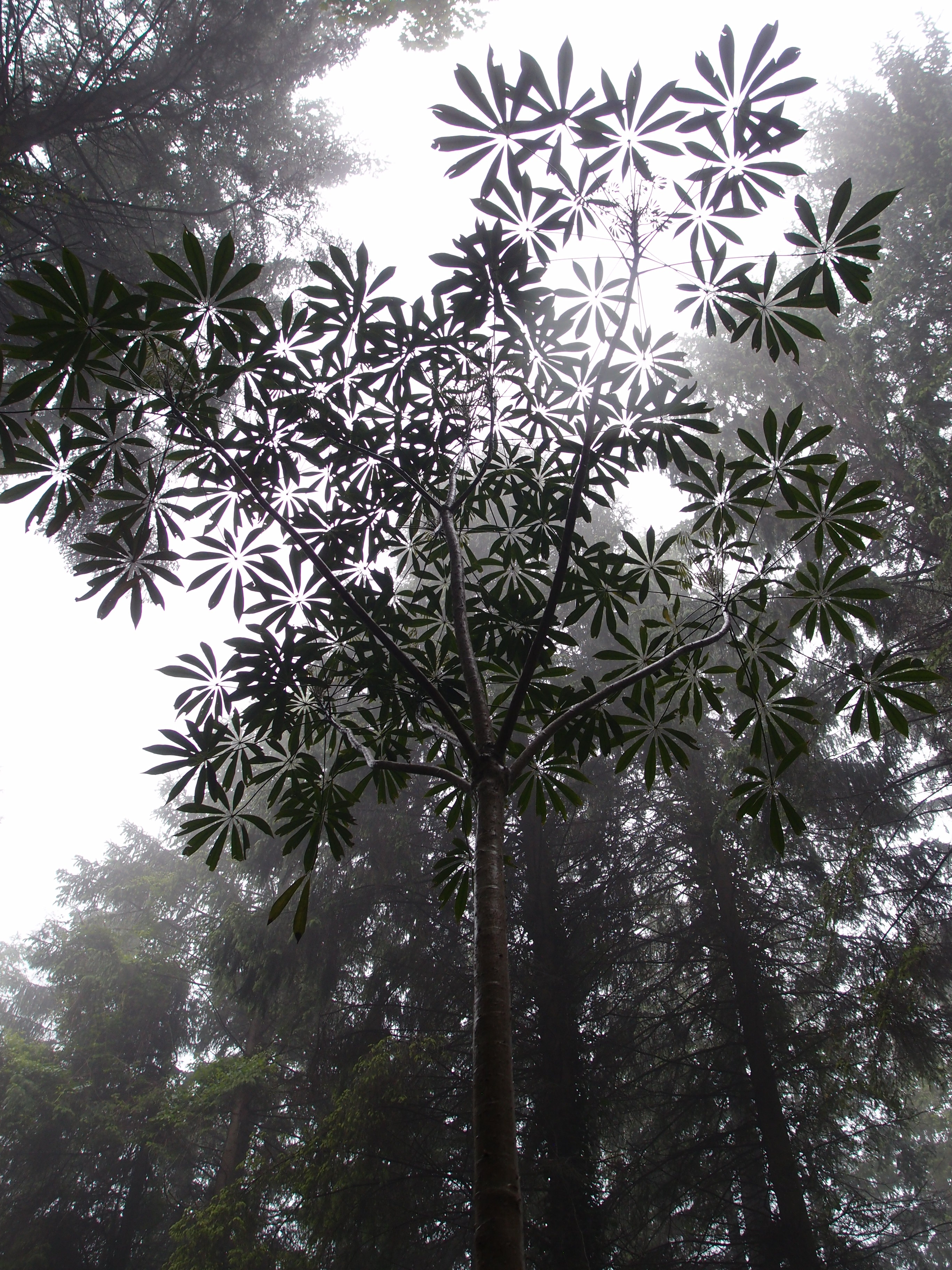
Heptapleurum taiwanianum

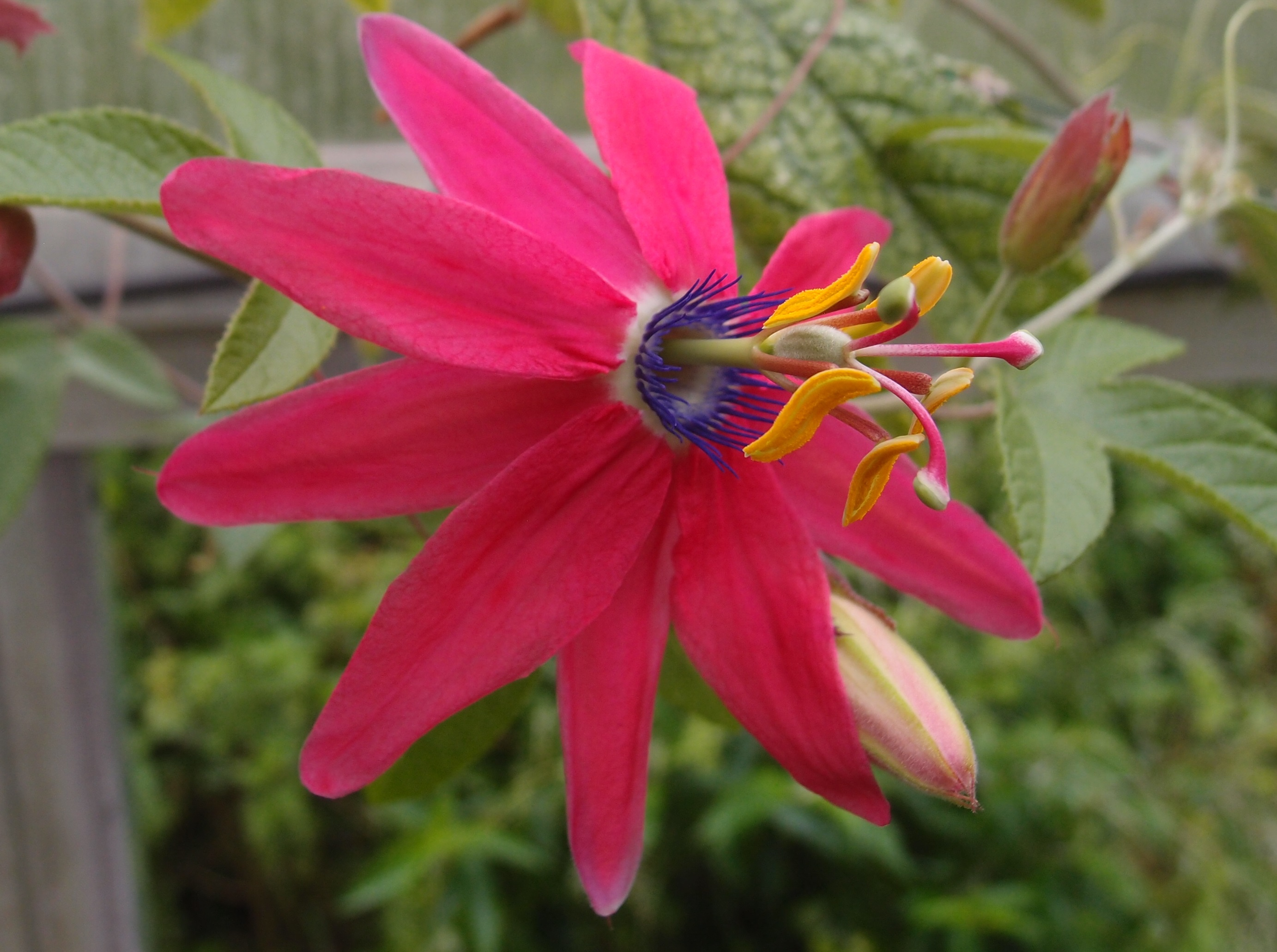
Passiflora 'Jardin Jungle 99'

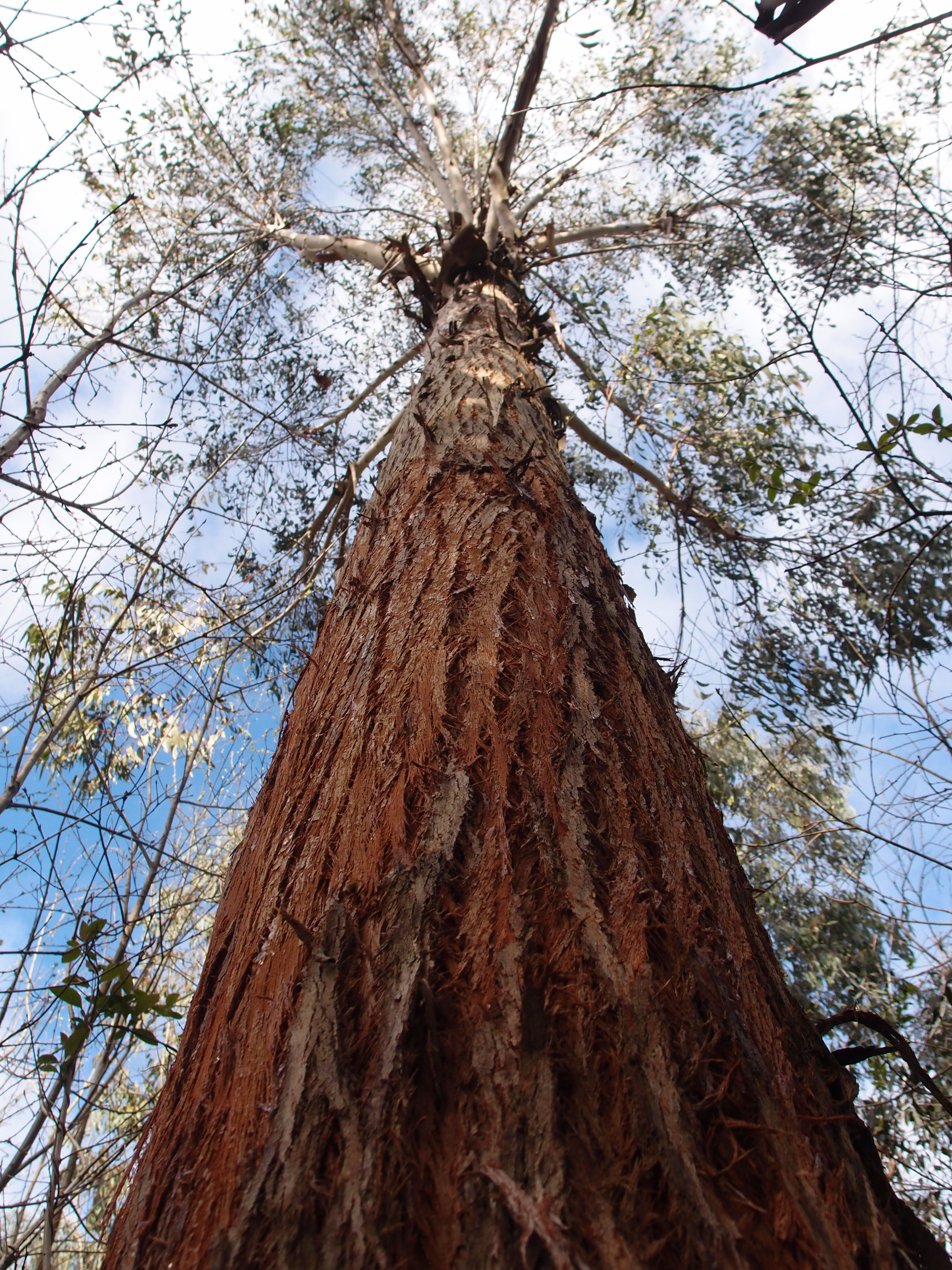
Eucalyptus delegatensis

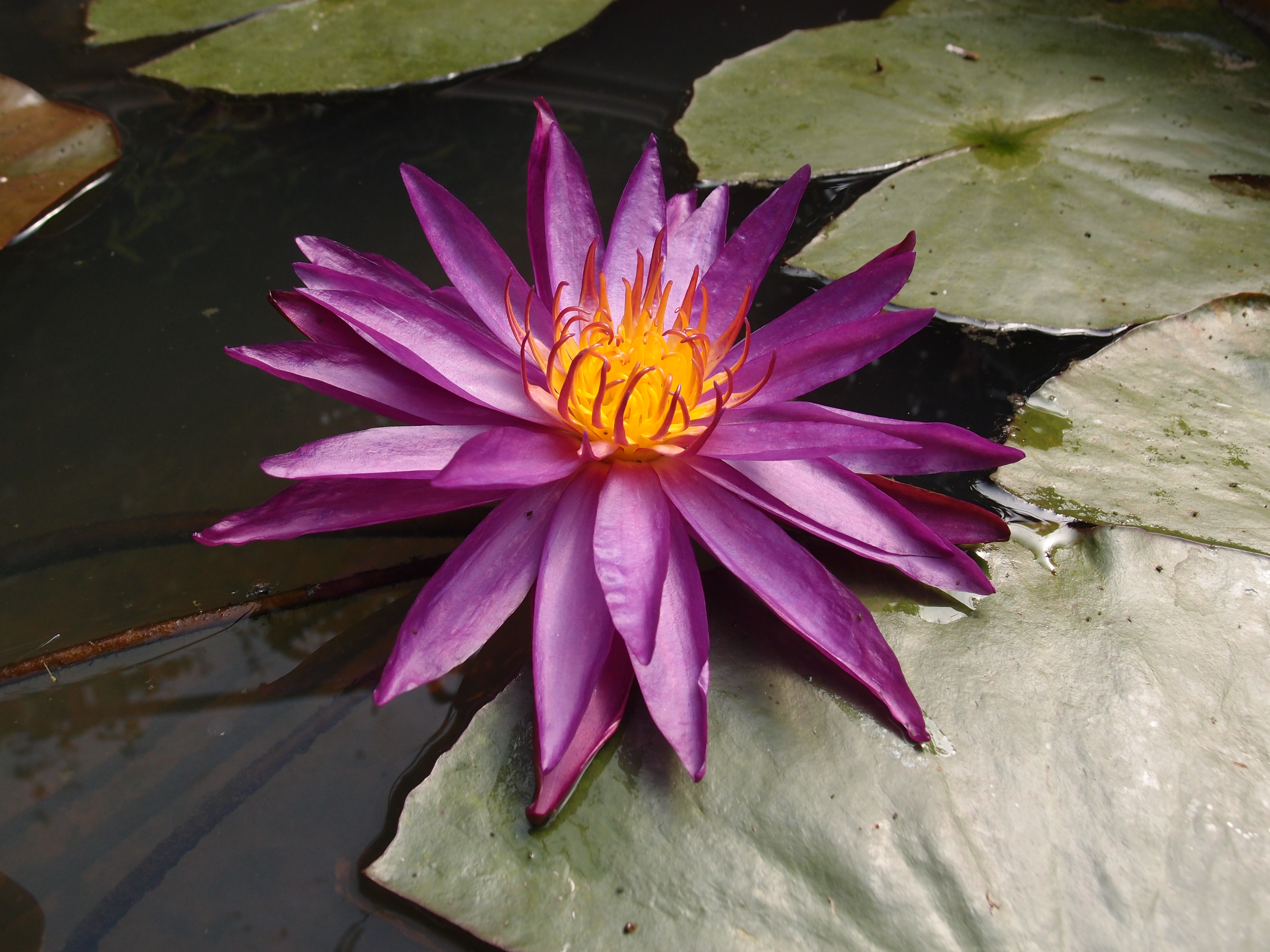
Nymphaea 'Detective Erika'

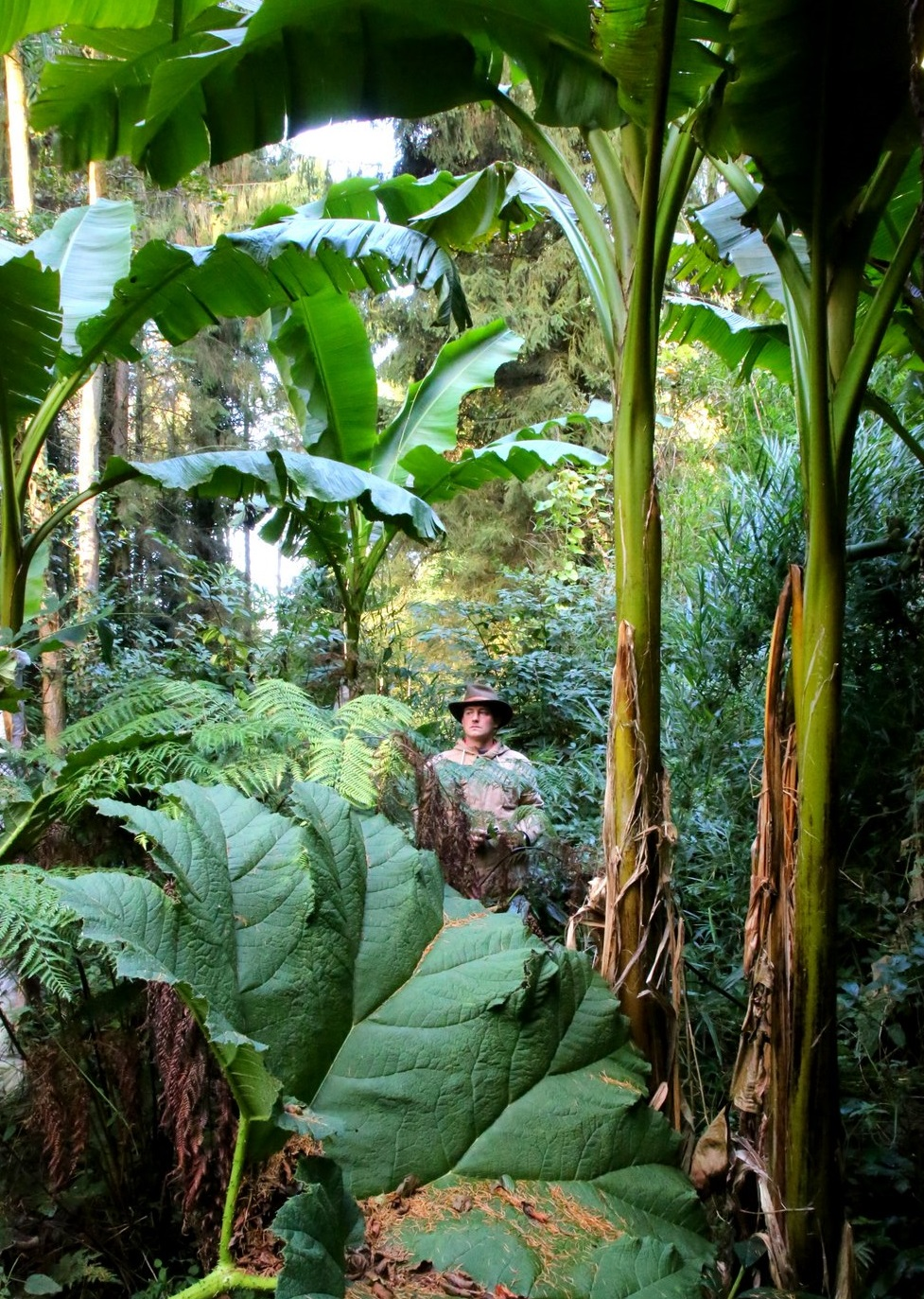
the jungle garden in autumn 2017

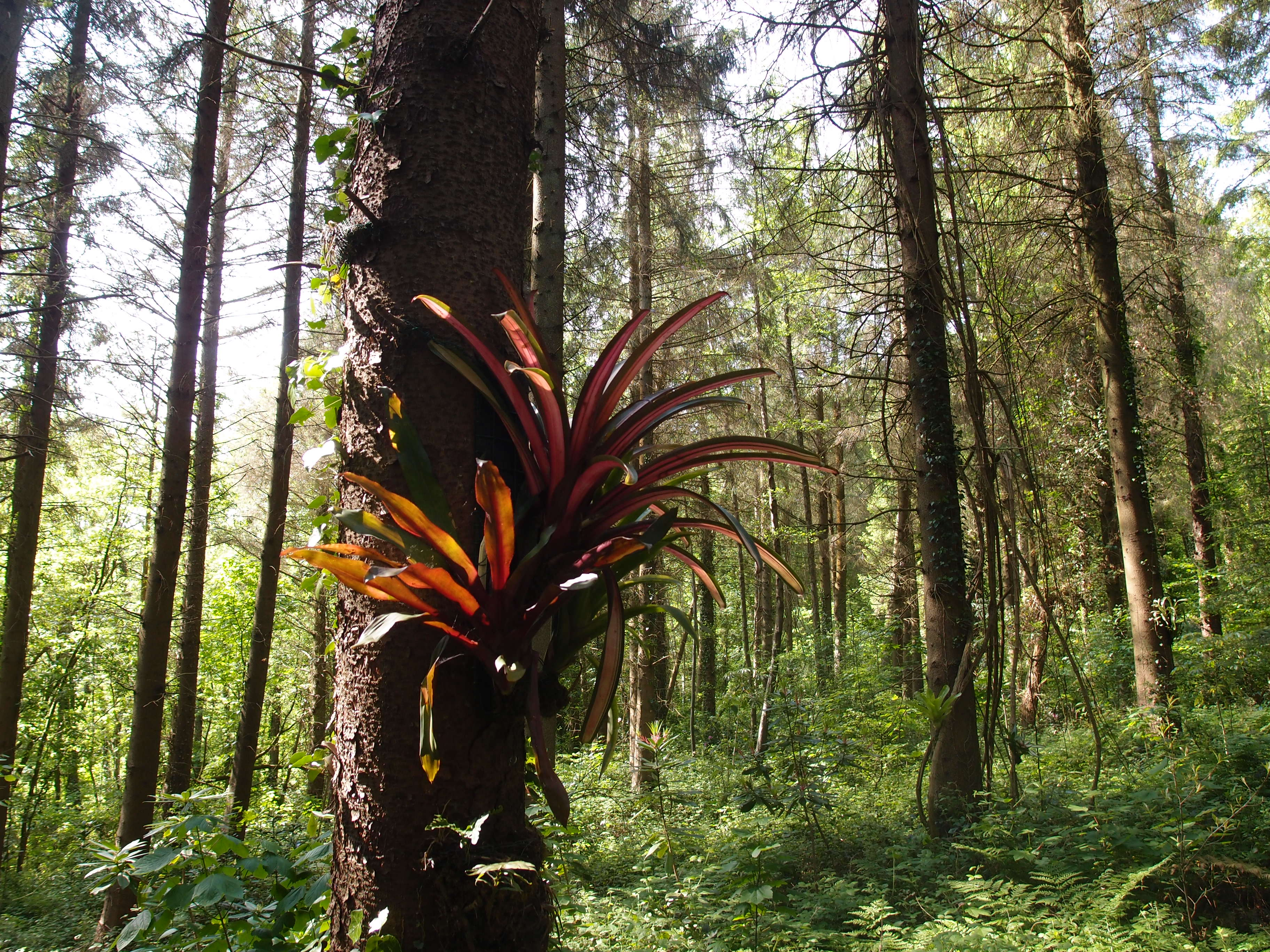
Epiphytic bromeliaceae

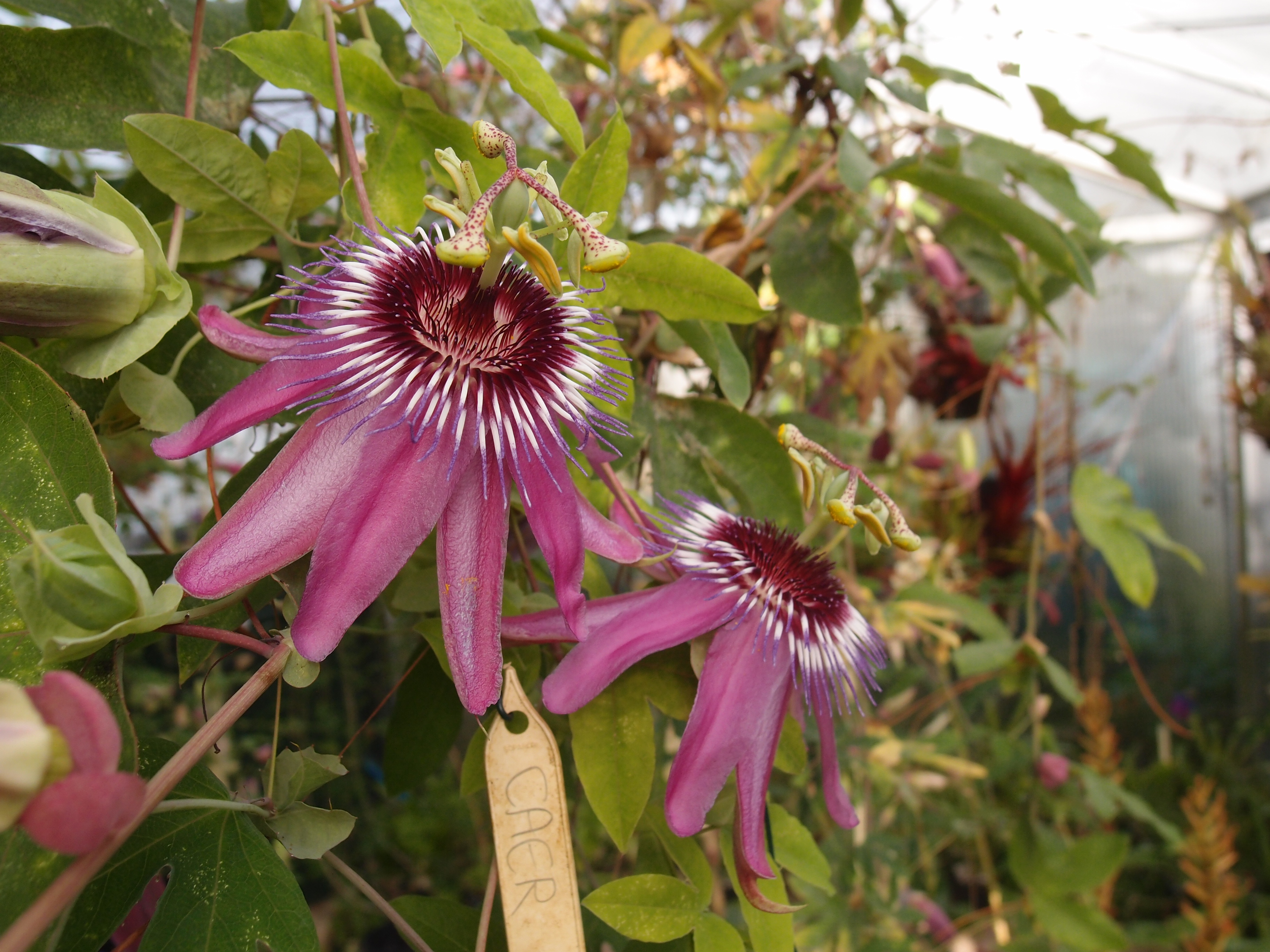
Passiflora 'Jardin Jungle 101'
