= Giant rhubarb =

Giant rhubarb or giant-rhubarb may refer to:

- Gunnera manicata
- Gunnera tinctoria
- Gunnera × cryptica
