= Eu, Seine-Maritime =

Eu
- Commune
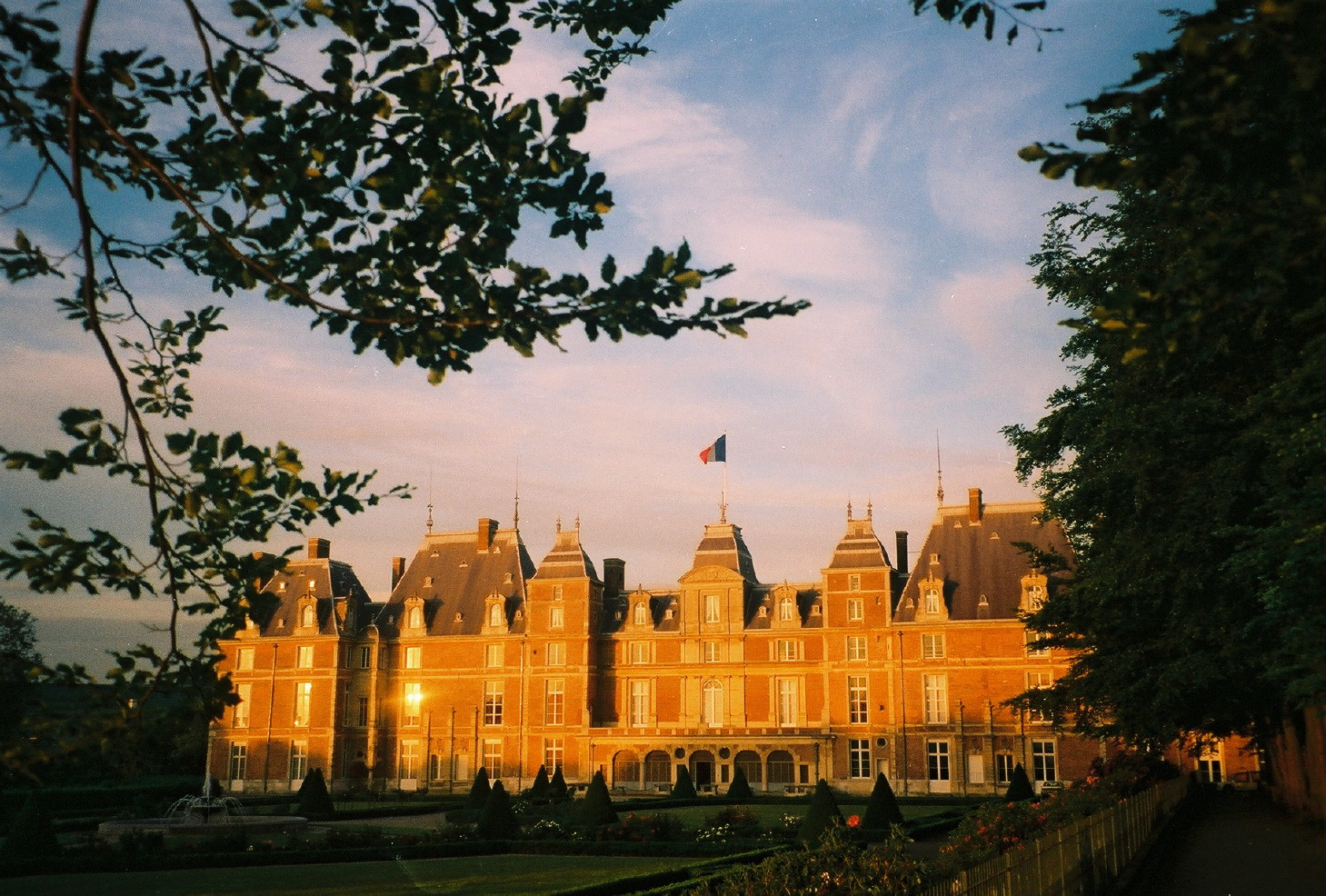
- Château d'Eu

- Coat of arms
- Location of Eu
- Location within France Location within Normandy
- Coordinates: 50°02′53″N 1°25′14″E
- Country: France
- Region: Normandy
- Department: Seine-Maritime
- Arrondissement: Dieppe
- Canton: Eu
- Intercommunality: CC Villes Sœurs

Government
  - Mayor (2020–2026): Michel Barbier
- Area^{1}: 17.93 km^{2} (6.92 sq mi)
- Elevation: 17 m (56 ft)
- Highest elevation: 140 m (460 ft)
- Lowest elevation: 2 m (6.6 ft)
- Population (2023): 6,499
  - Density: 362.5/km^{2} (938.8/sq mi)
- Time zone: UTC+01:00 (CET)
  - Summer (DST): UTC+02:00 (CEST)
- INSEE/Postal code: 76255 /76260
- ^{1} French Land Register data, which excludes lakes, ponds, glaciers > 1 km^{2} (0.386 sq mi or 247 acres) and river estuaries.

Eu (IPA: [ø]) is a commune in the Seine-Maritime department in the Normandy region in northern France.

Eu is located near the coast in the eastern part of the department, near the border with Picardy.

Its inhabitants are known in French as the Eudois.

== Geography ==
Eu is situated at the junction of the RD 1015, the RD 925, the RD 940 and the RD 1314 roads, in the steep-sided valley of the river Bresle, whose mouth is 4 km (2.5 mi) away to the north-west in Le Tréport. Eu station has rail connections to Beauvais and Le Tréport.

== Etymology ==
The name of the commune is related to that of the river on which it stands. Before being called the Bresle, this small river was known in the Middle Ages under the name of Ou, which then became Eu.

== History ==
The County of Eu was created in 996 by Duke Richard I of Normandy for his illegitimate son Geoffrey, Count of Brionne. It was a march protecting Normandy from invasion from the east.

In 1050, William, Duke of Normandy, the future William the Conqueror and king of England, married Matilda, the daughter of the Count of Flanders, at the chapel of the castle in Eu. The chapel is the only part of this castle which still stands today.

In 1180, Laurence O'Toole, the archbishop of Dublin and papal legate, fell ill at Eu on his way to meet King Henry II of England. He died there. He was beatified in 1186 and canonised in 1225 as St Laurence, becoming the patron saint of the town. The collegiate church was named for the Virgin Mary and for him, Notre-Dame et Saint-Laurent, and still holds some of his preserved relics. In the 12th century, King Richard I of England, who was also Duke of Normandy, built the city walls.

In 1430, Joan of Arc as a prisoner of the English spent a night there, during her journey to Rouen.

The county remained an independent fief of the French crown until 1472, when it was inherited by John II, Count of Nevers. In 1477 it was incorporated into the Burgundian territories of Charles the Bold. However, later that year Charles was killed in battle; King Louis XI took the opportunity to seize Charles' French fiefs, including Eu, and incorporated them in the French royal domain.

The British Queen Victoria visited Eu on two occasions as guest of Louis Philippe I. The first time in 1843 was to cement an early form of the Entente Cordiale between Britain and France. It was the first time monarchs of the two countries had met since King Henry VIII met with King Francis I on the Field of the Cloth of Gold in 1520.

The Croix de Guerre was awarded to the town in 1944.

=== Heraldry ===
Arms of Eu	The arms of Eu are blazoned : Argent, a lion passant Gules.

== Population ==
Historical population
Year	Pop.	±% p.a.
1968	8,079	—
1975	8,626	+0.94%
1982	8,588	−0.06%
1990	8,344	−0.36%
1999	8,081	−0.36%
2007	7,495	−0.94%
2012	7,270	−0.61%
2017	6,883	−1.09%
2023	6,499	−0.95%
Source: INSEE

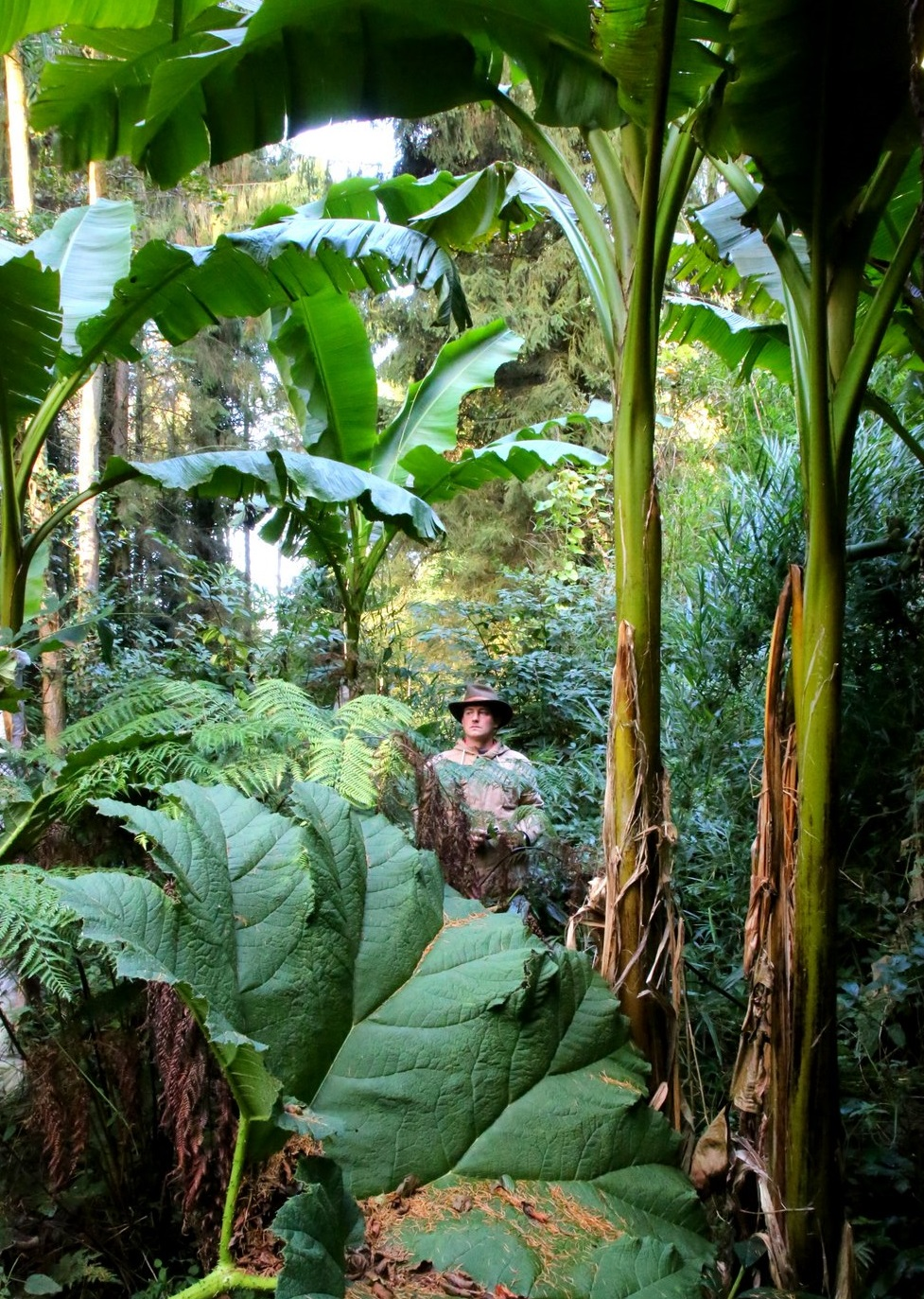
The Jardin Jungle of Eu

== Sights ==
It is mainly known for its exotic garden: the jardin jungle, its nearby national forest, the Eu Forest, the Renaissance style Château d'Eu and its college. There is also the archaelogical site of Briga, an ancient Gallo-Roman settlement.

== Economic activity ==
- Metal furniture
- Glassmaking (bottle manufacture)
- Tourism
- Telephony

== Sport ==
The commune has a football club Eu F.C. who play at the Stade Gérard-Carpentier.

== Twin towns ==
Eu is twinned with:

City	State	Country	Year
Haan	North Rhine-Westphalia	Germany	1966
Zouk Mikael	Mount Lebanon Governorate	Lebanon	2003
Ålesund	Møre og Romsdal	Norway	1996
Bad Lauchstädt	Saxony-Anhalt	Germany	1998

== See also ==
- Communes of the Seine-Maritime department
- Saint John Eudes, French missionary priest, promoter of popular devotion to the Sacred Heart of Jesus, whose family share the Eu patronym
