= Bredgar and Wormshill Light Railway =

Heritage railway in Kent, England

Coordinates: 51.297128°N 0.682891°E

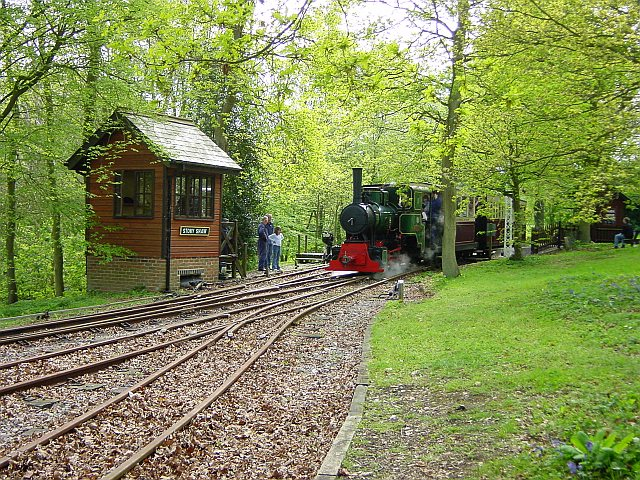
- Bronhilde pulling into Stony Shaw station

Technical
- Track gauge: 2 ft (610 mm)

Other
- Website: http://www.bwlr.co.uk

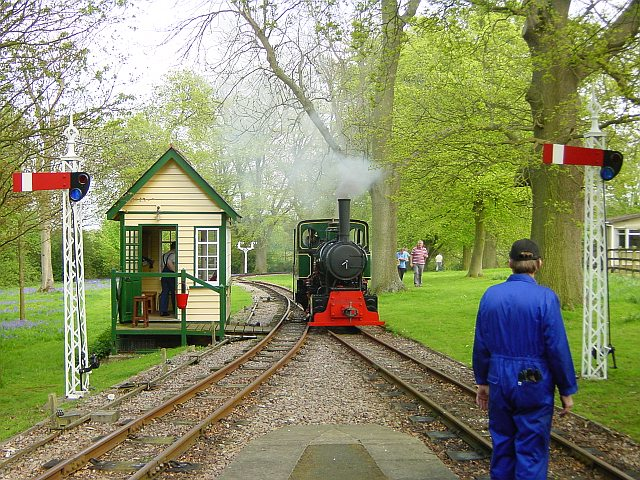
Locomotive Bronhilde on woodland track near Warren Wood station

The Bredgar and Wormshill Light Railway (BWLR) is located near the villages of Wormshill and Bredgar in Kent, just south of Sittingbourne. It is a 2 ft (610 mm) narrow gauge railway about three-quarters mile (1.2 km) in length.

The BWLR is a private line which has been built up as a hobby by a group of friends since the early 1970s. It is a fully operational line, operated to a high standard, with a station, engine sheds and workshops at Warren Wood station and a smaller station at the other end of the line, known as Stony Shaw.

The line is open to the public on the first Sunday of each month and most Wednesdays throughout the summer to raise money to maintain and manage the collection. On event days a number of other attractions are on display including a model railway, a Dutch street organ, a traction engine a steam roller, a Victorian beam engine, an American fire department Ladder truck and a range of old tractors and cars.

The Tearoom is open Wednesday to Sunday (9:00–15:00) throughout the year offering a selection of teas, coffees, cakes, sandwiches snacks and lunches.

The railway appeared briefly in a segment filmed for the BBC's Saturday Kitchen programme which aired on 18 June 2011.

== The Stations ==
- Warren Wood Station
- Stony Shaw Station

== Rolling stock ==
=== Operational steam locomotives ===
Manufacturer	Works number and year	Wheel arrangement	Number and name	Notes	Photo	Commons Link
Orenstein & Koppel	5668/1912	0-4-0WT	No. 6 Eigiau	Ex Penrhyn Quarry Railway. Sold to Bressingham in 1963. Acquired by the BWLR in 1995.		Category:Orenstein & Koppel 5668 Eigiau on Wikimedia Commons
Decauville	246/1897	0-4-2T	No. 7 Victory	Used at the Invicta Sugar Mill, Giru, Queensland, Australia. Sold in 1963 and used on a tourist railway. Acquired by the BWLR in 1984.		
Orenstein and Koppel	12722/1936	0-4-0WT	No. 8 Helga	Used at various construction sites in northern Germany until 1957. To UK in 1970 and used on the Brecon Mountain Railway. Acquired by the BWLR in 1999.		
John Fowler & Co.	13573/1912	0-4-2T	No. 10 Zambezi	Originally built to 500 mm (19 3/4 in) gauge. Used on Sena Estates railway, Mopeia, Mozambique, hauling sugar. Worked until 1965 then became derelict. To UK in 1998. regauged to 2 ft (610 mm) gauge. Steam test passed in 2009 and entered service in 2010.		Category:John Fowler and Co. 13573 Zambezi on Wikimedia Commons
John Fowler & Co.	15513/1920	0-4-2T	No.V11	Originally built to 500mm gauge, it worked with no.10 "Zambezi" at the Sena Sugar Estates in Mozambique, hauling cane sugar. After the Mozambique civil war, the railway was derelict. Returned to service in 2023, in "as delivered" finish.		

=== Steam locomotives undergoing overhaul or restoration ===
Manufacturer	Works number and year	Wheel arrangement	Number and name	Notes	Photo	Commons Link
John Fowler & Co.	18800/1930	0-6-0WT	No. 9 Limpopo	Ex Sena Sugar Estates, No. 17. Used at sugar mill in Mopeia, Mozambique. Acquired by the BWLR in 1998 and restored to working order, entering service in 2003.		Category:John Fowler and Co. 18800 Limpopo on Wikimedia Commons
Arnold Jung	3872/1931	0-6-0WT	No. 2 Katie	Used in sugar plantations in the Cameroons. Preserved in 1973 and acquired by the BWLR in 1980. Has flangeless centre driving wheels.		Category:Arnold Jung 3872 Katie on Wikimedia Commons

=== Operational diesel locomotives ===
Manufacturer	Works number and year	Wheel arrangement	Number and name	Notes	Photo
Baguley-Drewry	3775/1983	4wDH	No. 5 Bredgar	Worked on the 1,000 mm (3 ft 3 3/8 in) metre gauge lines at MoD Milford Haven. Acquired in 1995 and regauged to 2 ft (610 mm) gauge.	
Andrew Barclay	765/1988	4wDM	No. 14 Milstead	MoD No. NG54, Ex RAF Chilmark. Arrived at BWLR in 2014. Now in BWLR blue.	
Schöma	5239/1991	4wDH	Jenny	Used during the construction of the Channel Tunnel Arrived at BWLR in 2016.	

=== Diesel locomotives undergoing overhaul or restoration ===
Manufacturer	Works number and year	Wheel arrangement	Number and name	Notes	Photo
Motor Rail	9869/1953	4wDM	No. 12 Bicknor	Supplied new to Great Ouse River Authority, Ely, and in service until 1977. Then at Cotswold Wildlife Park railway. Acquired by the BWLR in 2010 from The Hop Farm Country Park, Beltring.	
Motor Rail	7073/1936	4wPM	No. 13 Lyne	Works No. MR 7073. Built 1936. Built as a Petrol loco. Converted to a Deutz air cooled engine and new box body by Alan Keef in 1970. Was used by Sinclair Horticulture Bolton Fell Cumbria and served there until 2016 when it moved to BWLR.	

== Locomotives no longer at the railway ==
Manufacturer	Works number and year	Wheel arrangement	Number and name	Notes	Photo	Commons Link
L. Schwartzkopff	9124/1927	0-4-0WT	No. 1 Bronhilde	Used at the Norddeutsche Affinerie copper smelting works, Hamburg. Sold to Bressingham Steam and Gardens in 1976. Acquired in 1979, it was the first steam locomotive at the BWLR. Sold to Richmond Light Railway in 2021.		Category:L. Schwartzkopff 9124 Bronhilde on Wikimedia Commons
Henschel & Sohn	29582/1956	0-6-0WT	No. 105 Siam	Worked on a sugar plantation in Chonburi Province, Thailand. Has visited Welshpool and Llanfair Light Railway. 750 mm (2 ft 5 1/2 in) gauge. Sold to a railway in Latvia.		
Hudswell Clarke	DM1366/1965	0-6-0DM	No. 15 (unnamed)	Ex National Coal Board Harden Colliery and Seaham Colliery. Sold to South Tynedale Railway in 1990. To BWLR in 2006, then left in 2021.		
Hunslet Engine Co.	1429/1922	0-4-0ST	No. 3 Lady Joan	Used in north Wales slate quarries until 1967. Has been used at Woburn Abbey and Knebworth. Acquired by the BWLR in 1996. Moved to an initially undisclosed location in Kent, 2026.		Category:Hunslet 0-4-0ST 1429 Lady Joan on Wikimedia Commons
W.G. Bagnall	2088/1919	0-4-0ST	No. 4 Armistice	One of two locomotives used on the Birmingham, Tame and Rea District Drainage Board Railway Armistice, was preserved in 1961 and renamed Lady Luxborough. Acquired in 1991 by the BWLR and restored in 1992, regaining her original name. Moved to Bressingham Steam and Gardens, 2026.		Category:Bagnall 2088 Armistice on Wikimedia Commons

== Traction engines ==
The museum has four steam road locomotives in its collection; some are operational and steamed on open days and others are undergoing repair, restoration or overhaul.

Manufacturer	Works number and year	Registration number and name	Notes	Photo
Garrett	33442/1919	BL 9009	Agricultural engine used at Hartford Manor, Faringdon until 1943, then at Witney until 1950. Relegated to heating a greenhouse at Brize Norton until preserved in 1964. Has been named King of the Road and Caroline in preservation but did not carry a name during its working life. Acquired by the BWLR in 1988. Operational and used on event days.	
Ruston & Hornsby	115023/1922	XM 6373	Steam roller new to Henry Woodham, Catford in 1922. Used on road repairs until the 1950s. Preserved in 1978 and acquired by the BWLR in 1988. Operational and used on event days.	

== Cars ==
=== Bean cars ===
The BWLR is home to a collection of Bean cars.

Model	Power	Year built	Registration number	Notes	Photo
Model 6 Tourer	14 HP	1923	SV9172	Exported to Australia in 1923, re-imported in 2001.	
Model 2	11.9 horsepower (8.9 kW)	1922	ME5904	Under restoration as of May 2015.	
Model 2	11.9 horsepower (8.9 kW)	1923	BU2789	One of the most original Bean cars in preservation. This car left the collection 2012.	
Model 3	14 horsepower (10 kW)	1925	PE2445	Converted to a pick-up in the early 1930s. Restored to five-seat tourer in 1974. This car left the collection 2012.	
Model 4	12 horsepower (8.9 kW)	1925	XW8431	Used by a funeral director as a following car. This car left the collection 2012.	
Model 4	12 horsepower (8.9 kW)	1926	FD3435	Car has original body, which has four identical doors. This car left the collection 2012.	
Model 6		1927	SV8671	Exported new to Australia. Fitted with a body made locally in Adelaide. This car left the collection 2012.	
Omnibus		1929	UL1771	Body by Birch Bros, Kentish Town on a Bean 1½ Ton chassis. Used as a caravan 1941–1966, bought for preservation in 1966 and restored 1988–1991. This vehicle left the collection 2012.	
Model 11		1930	FG6161	Built on a 1½ Ton chassis. Spent its working life in Wooler, Northumberland. Bought for preservation in 1970 and restored 1990–2000. This car left the collection 2012.	
Pick-up Truck		1926		This vehicle left the collection 2012.	
Van			XM7525	This vehicle left the collection 2012.	

=== Other cars ===
Manufacturer	Model	Year built	Registration number	Notes	Photo
Rolls-Royce	Phantom I	1928	YX4095		

== Other exhibits ==
Other exhibits to be found at the BWLR include:

=== Beam engine ===
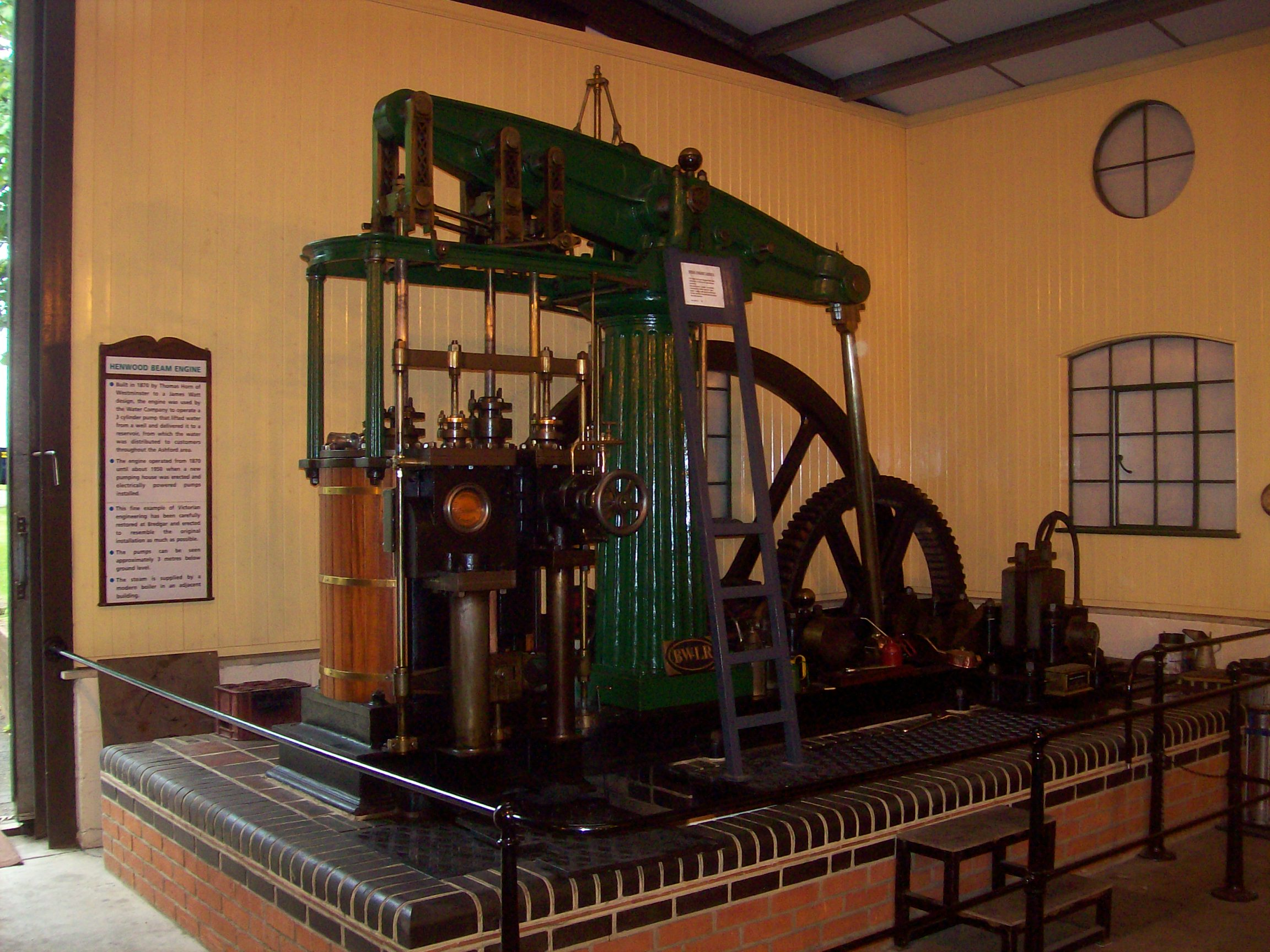
Beam engine

An 1870 beam engine built by Thomas Horn to a design by James Watt. One of two supplied to a waterworks at Ashford. Acquired in 1988 and restored to working order.

== Twinning ==
The BWLR is twinned with the Chemin de Fer de La Valée de l'Ouche (CFVO), Bligny-sur-Ouche, Côte-d'Or, France.

== See also ==
- British narrow gauge railways
