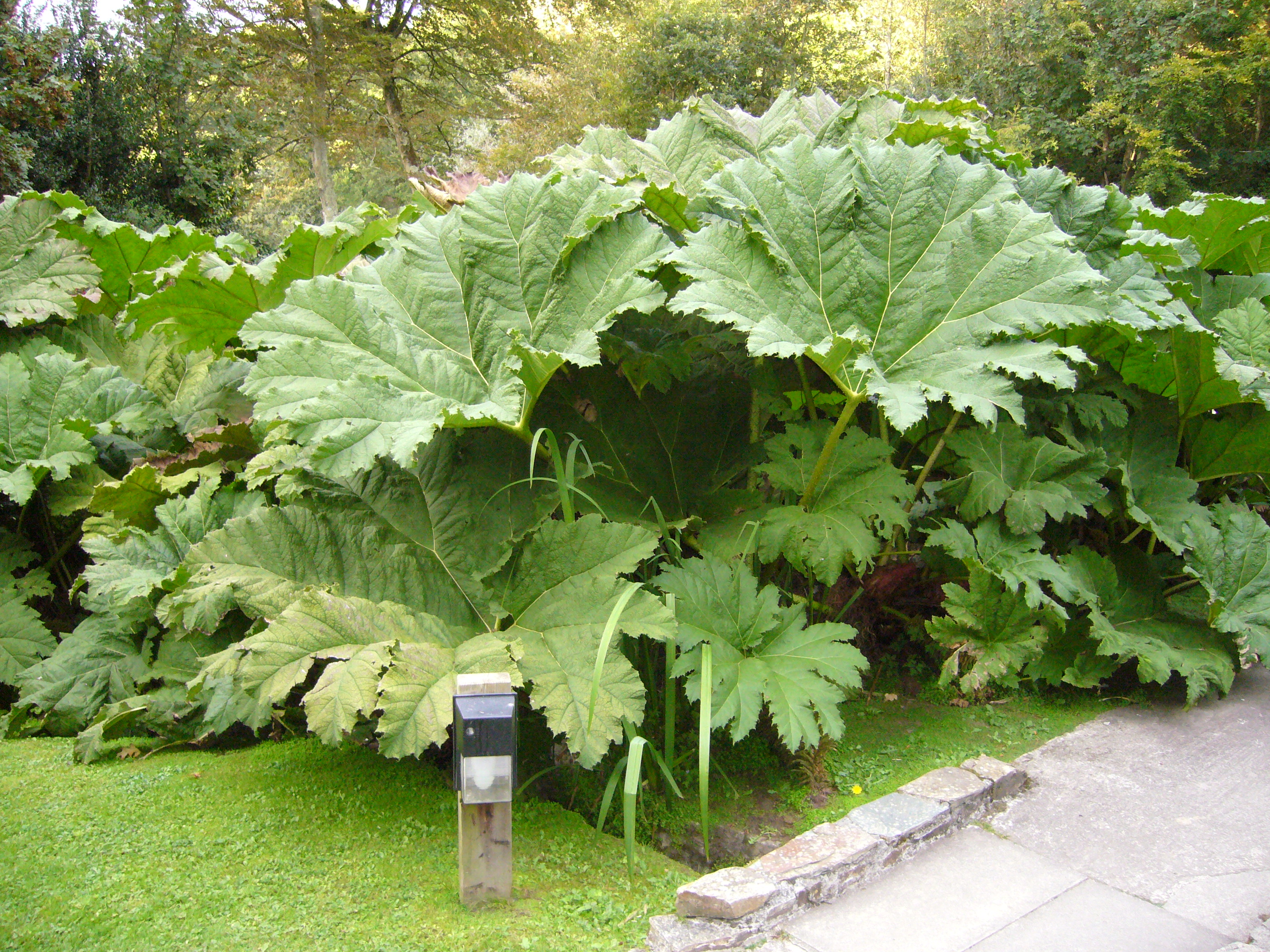
- Gunnera growing at St Just in Roseland, Cornwall, England, so likely to be G. × cryptica

Scientific classification
- Kingdom: Plantae
- Clade: Tracheophytes
- Clade: Angiosperms
- Clade: Eudicots
- Order: Gunnerales
- Family: Gunneraceae
- Genus: Gunnera
- Subgenus: Gunnera subg. Panke
- Species: G. × cryptica

Binomial name
- Gunnera × cryptica J.M.H.Shaw

= Gunnera × cryptica =

Hybrid between Gunnera manicata and Gunnera tinctoria

Gunnera × cryptica is a hybrid between Gunnera manicata and Gunnera tinctoria. Both species were introduced into cultivation in Western Europe towards the end of the 19th century. The hybrid occurred spontaneously in cultivation, in Europe probably around 1873. Both morphological and molecular analyses have shown that plants widely cultivated in Britain and Ireland under the name Gunnera manicata were all the hybrid, and that the true species G. manicata is no longer found there. This situation may also be the case in Europe and other parts of the world. The hybrid is more resistant to frost and adverse conditions than G. manicata, which is likely to be why it has replaced it in cultivation.

== Description ==
Gunnera × cryptica is a giant herbaceous plant growing from rhizomes. Rosettes of leaves are produced annually. The leaves on mature plants may reach about 2 m (7 ft) across, but leaf size varies depending on the age of the plant and where it is growing. The leaves may be slightly asymmetrical, and have 5–7 conspicuous lobes, usually with pointed tips, and with toothed margins. The radius of the leaf at a division between lobes is about a half to two thirds of the radius of a lobe. The base of the leaf is usually heart-shaped (cordate); the basal lobes do not usually overlap when the leaf is mature. The leaf stalks (petioles) may be up to about 1.5 m (4.9 ft) long, and are usually covered with 4–5 mm (0.2–0.2 in) long prickles. The flowers are borne in axillary solitary inflorescences, loosely branched with branches to about 11 cm (4.3 in) long or less. Flowers are densely packed along the branches. Individual flowers have sepals 1–1.5 mm (0.04–0.06 in) long. Solitary or paired petals are found only sporadically. Flowers may have one or two stamens, or none. Fruit is rarely produced.

Gunnera × cryptica may be distinguished from G. manicata by the open sinus at the leaf base. Its main leaf veins are often asymmetrically branched. The inflorescence branches are shorter, up to 11 cm (4.3 in) long. It may be distinguished from G. tinctoria by the presence of basal leaf lobes that sometimes slightly overlap. Its inflorescence is conical, rather than less open and club-shaped.

Gunnera × cryptica has hybrid vigour, and is more resistant to frost and adverse conditions than G. manicata, which is likely to be why it replaced it in cultivation.

== Taxonomy ==
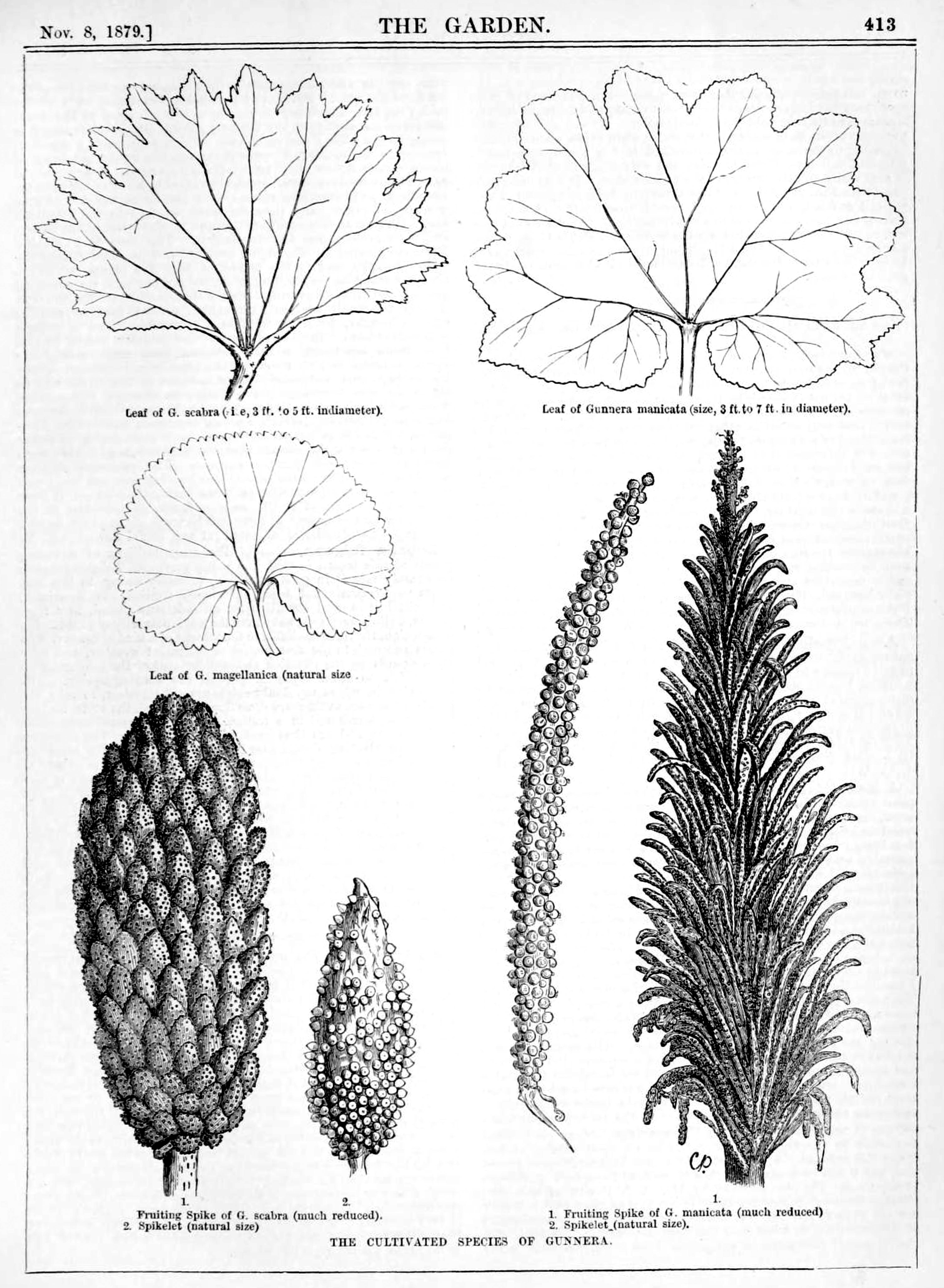
1879 illustrations of Gunnera tinctoria (left top and bottom) and Gunnera manicata (right) in cultivation

The identity and nomenclature of some Gunnera species are confused. One of the parents of G. × cryptica, G. tinctoria, has been confused with other Gunnera taxa from western South America, and may be treated under the synonyms G. scabra Ruiz & Pavon or G. thyrsiflora Ruiz ex Barreiro. G. tinctoria is native to south Argentina and central and south Chile. In cultivation, the name of the other parent, G. manicata Linden ex André, has regularly been applied to the hybrid G. × cryptica, which has also been treated as a variety of G. scabra (i.e. G. tinctoria), either var. major or var. longiscapa. G. manicata is endemic to south Brazil. Both species, and hence the hybrid, are members of subgenus Panke.

== Cultivation ==
In December 2023, it was announced that Gunnera × cryptica (which is usually grown under the name Gunnera manicata) was to be subject to a ban in the UK, meaning it cannot be sold or cultivated, and those who have it in their gardens must ensure it does not spread.
