= List of basal eudicot families =

Telopea aspera, a waratah species
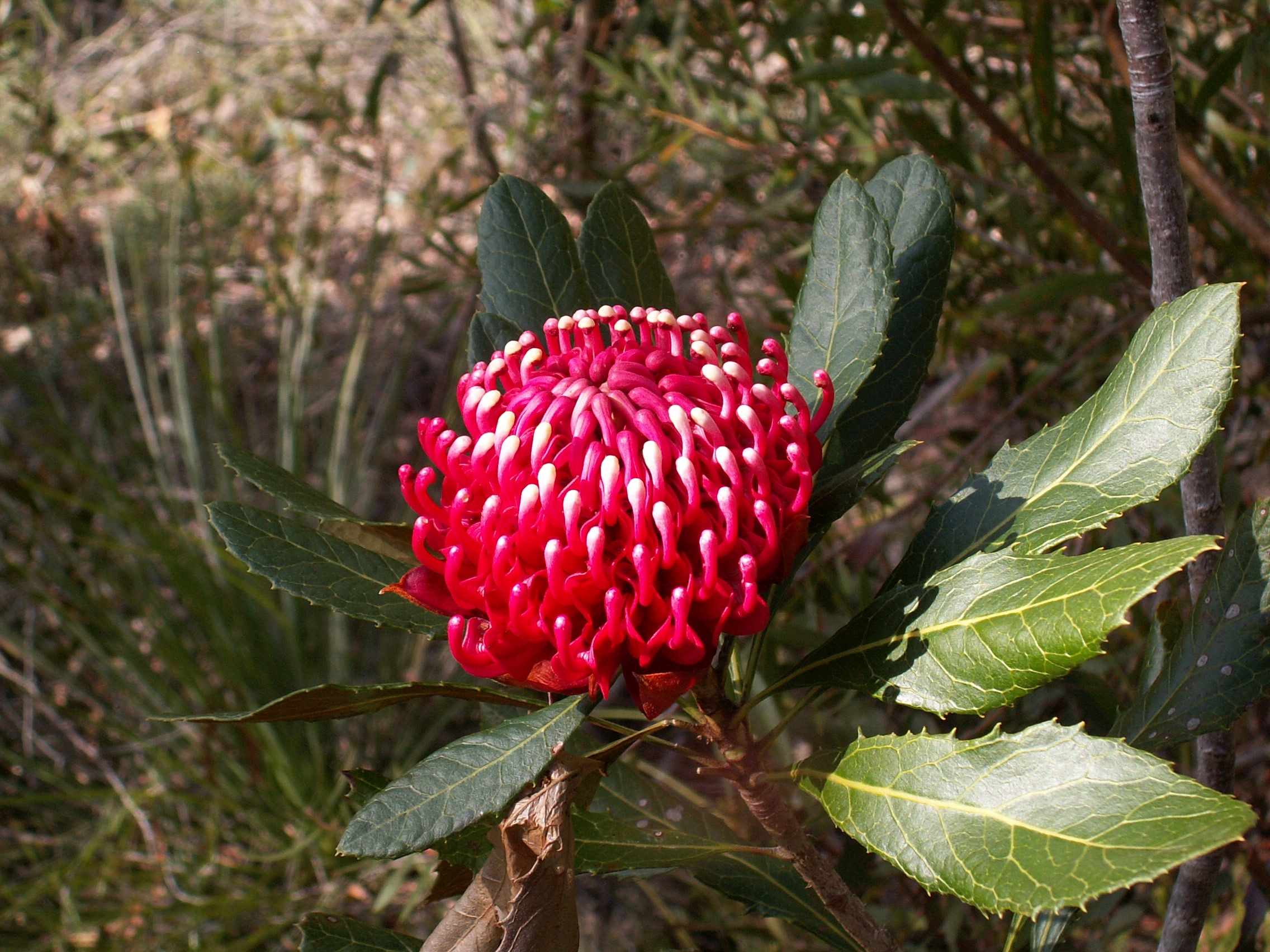
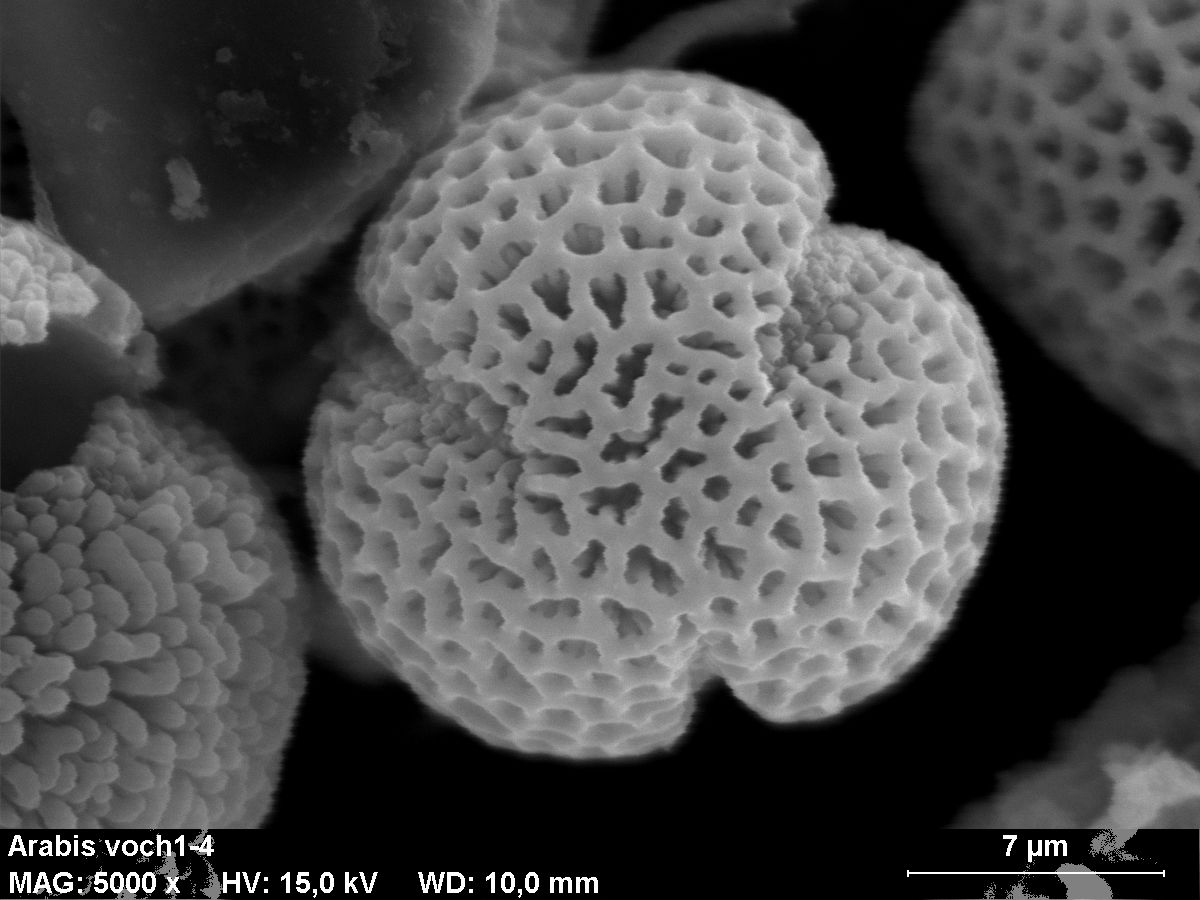
A microscopic pollen grain of Arabis, showing three colpi

The basal eudicots are a group of 13 related families of flowering plants in four orders: Buxales, Proteales, Ranunculales and Trochodendrales. (Note: The taxonomy (classification) in this list follows Plants of the World (2017) and the fourth Angiosperm Phylogeny Group system. Total counts of genera for each family come from Plants of the World Online. (See the POWO license.) Extinct taxa are not included.) Like the core eudicots (the rest of the eudicots), they have pollen grains with three colpi (grooves) or other derived structures, and usually have flowers with four or five petals (sometimes multiples of four or five, sometimes reduced or fused). Unlike other eudicots, they sometimes have flowers with petals in twos or multiples of two.

The basal eudicots include trees, shrubs, woody vines and herbaceous plants. Cultivars of Buxus are used for hedges and topiary, and the high-quality wood is commonly used for decorative carvings and musical instruments. The sacred lotus is the national flower of India and Vietnam, and the waratah is the floral emblem of the Australian state of New South Wales. The opium poppy, Papaver somniferum, a source of morphine, was cultivated thousands of years ago in Mesopotamia. Macadamia nuts are mainly grown in Hawaii and Australia.

The orders Dilleniales and Gunnerales are basal within the core eudicots. Species of Gunnerales often have serrate (serrated) leaves, with flowers similar to those of Buxales. The epidermis and hairs on species of Dilleniales are often full of silica.

== Glossary ==
From the glossary of botanical terms:

- annual: a plant species that completes its life cycle within a single year or growing season
- basal: attached close to the base (of a plant or an evolutionary tree diagram)
- climber: a vine that leans on, twines around or clings to other plants for vertical support
- deciduous: shedding or falling seasonally, as with bark, leaves, or petals
- glandular hair: a hair tipped with a secretory structure
- herbaceous: not woody; usually green and soft in texture
- perennial: lives for more than two years
- unisexual: bearing only male or only female reproductive organs (i.e. not bisexual)
- woody: hard and lignified; not herbaceous

The APG IV system is the fourth in a series of plant taxonomies from the Angiosperm Phylogeny Group.

== Dilleniales and Gunnerales families ==
Dilleniales and Gunnerales families
Family and a common name (Note: Each family's formal name ends in the Latin suffix -aceae and is derived from the name of a genus that is or once was part of the family.)	Type genus and etymology (Note: Some plants were named for naturalists (unless otherwise noted).)	Total genera; global distribution	Description and uses	Order	Type genus images
Dilleniaceae (guineaflower family)	Dillenia, for Johann Jacob Dillenius (1684–1747)	11 genera, throughout the tropics and extending into Asia and Australia	Shrubs, trees, woody vines and a few herbaceous plants. Dillenia and Hibbertia species are grown as ornamentals, and some Dillenia fruits are edible.	Dilleniales	Dillenia indica
Gunneraceae (giant-rhubarb family)	Gunnera, for Johan Ernst Gunnerus (1718–1773)	1 genus, in the Southern Hemisphere and low northern latitudes	Small to very large herbaceous plants, usually perennials, with nitrogen-fixing bacteria. The genus is planted along pond edges in many temperate gardens.	Gunnerales	Gunnera magellanica
Myrothamnaceae (resurrection-shrub family)	Myrothamnus, from Greek for "perfume bush"	1 genus, in East Africa and Madagascar	Fragrant unisexual shrubs. This genus is the only woody resurrection plant; at the end of the dry season, the leaves resuscitate and turn green after wetting.	Gunnerales	Myrothamnus flabellifolius

== Basal eudicot families ==
Basal eudicot families
Family and a common name	Type genus and etymology	Total genera; global distribution	Description and uses	Order	Type genus images
Berberidaceae (barberry family)	Berberis, from an Arabic plant name	13 genera, in temperate zones worldwide	Deciduous and evergreen shrubs, small trees and herbaceous perennials. Berberis fruits are sometimes used in cooking. The genus hosts stem rust, which can infest cereal grains.	Ranunculales	Berberis vulgaris
Buxaceae (box family)	Buxus, from a Latin plant name	6 genera, on all continents except Australia and Antarctica	Mostly shrubs and trees, usually without hairs or scales. Pachysandra terminalis is planted as a shade-loving evergreen ground cover.	Buxales	Buxus sempervirens
Circaeasteraceae (witch's-star family)	Circaeaster, for Circe, a witch of Greek myth	2 genera, scattered in Asian montane habitats	Herbaceous perennials and annuals	Ranunculales	Circaeaster agrestis
Eupteleaceae (Asian-elm family)	Euptelea, from Greek for "good elm"	1 genus, in a variety of temperate zones in Asia	Deciduous shrubs and trees with spirally arranged leaves. Both species are grown as ornamental trees.	Ranunculales	Euptelea pleiosperma
Lardizabalaceae (zabala-fruit family)	Lardizabala, for Manuel de Lardizábal y Uribe (1744–1824), a politician	7 genera, in southern South America and temperate East Asia	Woody vines, including climbers, and a few shrubs. Akebia quinata is a temperate garden ornamental, and its shoots are sometimes used in vegetable tempura in Japan.	Ranunculales	Lardizabala biternata
Menispermaceae (moonseed family)	Menispermum, from Greek for "moon seeds"	76 genera, most in tropical rainforests	Woody vines, along with some shrubs, small trees and herbaceous plants. The arrow poison curare is made from Chondodendron.	Ranunculales	Menispermum canadense
Nelumbonaceae (sacred-lotus family)	Nelumbo, from a Sinhalese plant name	1 genus, in North America and southern and East Asia, in zones ranging from temperate to tropical	Herbaceous aquatic perennials with underground rhizomes that produce tubers. The tubers and seeds are popular in Asian cuisine. Leaf surfaces have superhydrophobic wax.	Proteales	Nelumbo nucifera
Papaveraceae (poppy family)	Papaver, from a Latin plant name	45 genera, mostly in temperate zones north of the equator	Mostly herbaceous annuals and perennials, with a few shrubs and fewer trees. Poppy seeds are widely used in baked goods. Papaver somniferum is harvested to produce opiates, including morphine.	Ranunculales	Papaver rhoeas
Platanaceae (plane-tree family)	Platanus, from a Greek plant name	1 genus, in parts of North America, Europe and Asia.	Tall deciduous trees with peeling bark. Plane (sycamore) wood is durable, and traditionally used for butcher's blocks. The hairs on new shoots can cause an allergic reaction.	Proteales	Platanus orientalis
Proteaceae (sugarbush family)	Protea, for Proteus, a Greek god	80 genera, mainly in the Southern Hemisphere, especially in Australia	Trees and shrubs, usually with bisexual flowers. Banksia, Leucadendron, Protea and other genera are grown as ornamentals and for the cut-flower trade. Chilean hazelnuts are eaten in South America and New Zealand.	Proteales	Protea cynaroides
Ranunculaceae (buttercup family)	Ranunculus, from Latin for "little frog" (some species are aquatic)	50 genera, worldwide, mostly in temperate zones	Herbaceous plants, woody vines and small shrubs. Many genera are popular garden plants, including Aconitum, Anemone, Aquilegia, Clematis, Delphinium, Ranunculus and Thalictrum.	Ranunculales	Ranunculus repens
Sabiaceae (pao-hua family)	Sabia, from a Hindi plant name	3 genera, in tropical and warm temperate East Asia and Central and South America	Evergreen and deciduous shrubs, trees and woody vines	Proteales	Meliosma simplicifolia (type genus not pictured)
Trochodendraceae (wheel-tree family)	Trochodendron, from Greek for "wheel" (of stamens) and "tree"	2 genera, in subtropical and temperate East Asia	Evergreen shrubs and trees with spirally arranged leaves and limited vascular systems	Trochodendrales	Trochodendron aralioides

== See also ==
- List of plant family names with etymologies
