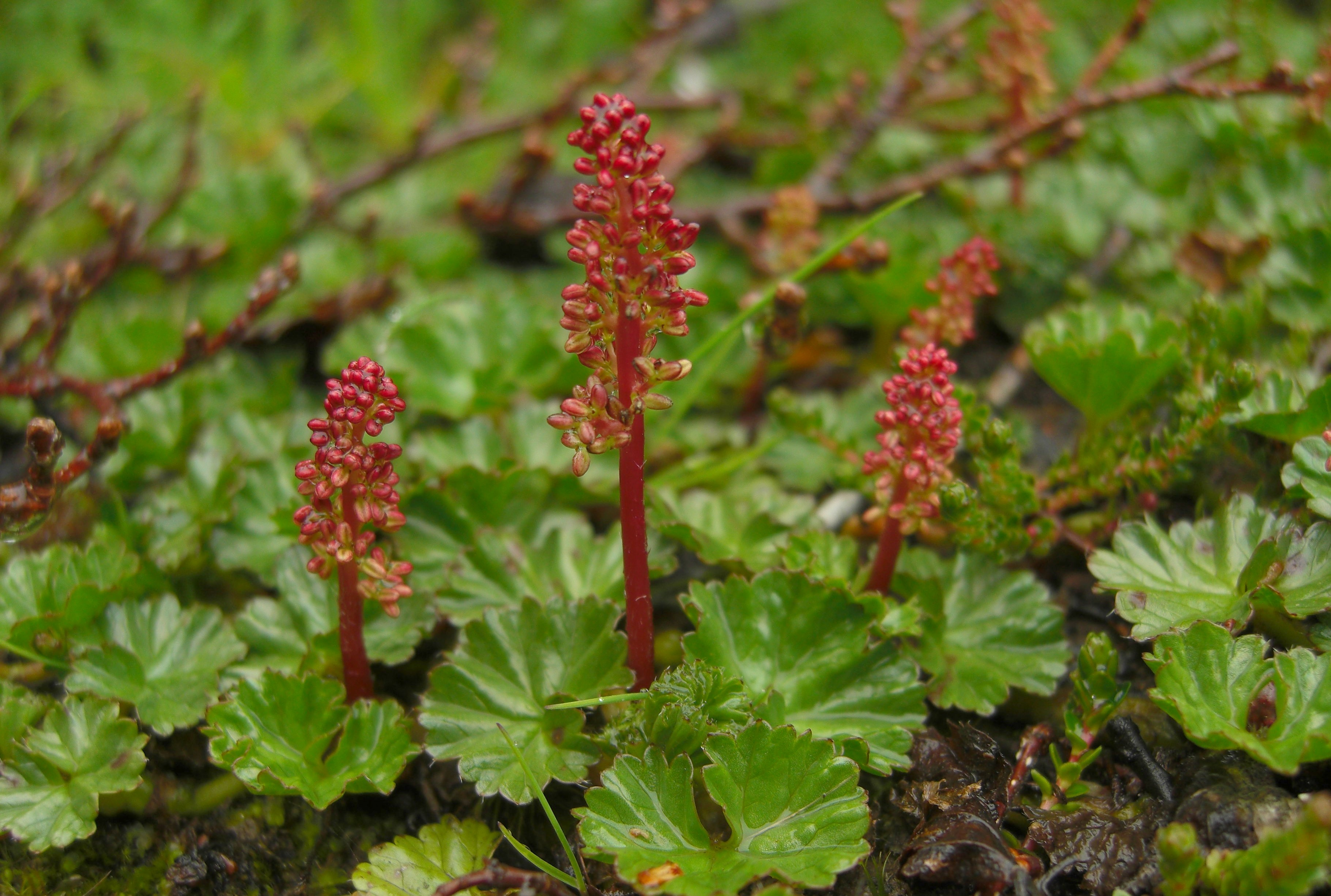

Scientific classification
- Kingdom: Plantae
- Clade: Tracheophytes
- Clade: Angiosperms
- Clade: Eudicots
- Order: Gunnerales
- Family: Gunneraceae
- Genus: Gunnera
- Species: G. magellanica

Binomial name
- Gunnera magellanica Lam.

= Gunnera magellanica =

Species of flowering plant

Gunnera magellanica is a perennial rhizomatous dioecious herb native to Chile, Argentina and the Falkland Islands, and Andean areas of Peru and Ecuador. In the southern part of its range, it grows in damper parts of the Magellanic subpolar forests and Valdivian temperate forests, and shrub formations on Tierra del Fuego, with an altitudinal range from sea level to 1,500 m (4,920 ft).

This species colonizes the bare land that appears upon retreating glaciers in Southern Chile. Since G. magellanica can form symbiosis with mycorrhizal fungi and cyanobacteria, thereby enriching the soil with nutrients, the species has been proposed to facilitate the establishment of other plant species.

== Description ==
Unlike its congeners, G. tinctoria and G. manicata, the leaves are small, approximately 6 cm (2.4 in) across. They are rounded or kidney-shaped, stipulate on long (2–10 cm (0.79–3.94 in)) petioles, with crenate edges.

Flowers are unisexual, with female inflorescences shorter than male ones. The fruit is a bright red berry (drupe) 3–5 mm in diameter.

The leaves die back in the austral autumn, so G. magellanica perennates as under-ground rhizomes, and is therefore classified as a cryptophyte.

== Taxonomy ==
Gunnera magellanica was first described by Jean-Baptiste Lamarck in Encyclopédie Méthodique, Botanique 3: 61, t. 801, f. 2. 1789.

Etymology

Gunnera: the generic name honours the Norwegian botanist and bishop Johan Ernst Gunnerus.

magellanica: geographical epithet referring to its distribution in proximity to the Magellan Straits.

Synonyms

- Gunnera falklandica Hook.
- Gunnera integrifolia Blume
- Gunnera plicata Vahl
- Gunnera reniformis Gay ex Blume
- Misandra magellanica (Lam.) J.F. Gmel.

== In popular culture ==
=== Vernacular names ===
Vernacular names are frutilla del diablo in Spanish, and in English on the Falkland Islands it is called pigvine or pig vine.

=== Garden plant ===
Gardeners in English-speaking countries know it as baby gunnera, devil's strawberry (probably a direct translation of the Spanish name) or dwarf rhubarb. As a garden plant G. magellanica can be used as ground cover, but is sometimes invasive. It rarely fruits as it is dioecious and both male and female plants are needed.

=== Stamps ===
G. magellanica featured on the 1½ d. stamp of the 1968 "Floral Issue" of Falkland Island postage stamps.

== Bibliography ==
1. Foster, R. C. 1958. A catalogue of the ferns and flowering plants of Bolivia. Contr. Gray Herb. 184: 1–223.
2. Jørgensen, P. M. & C. Ulloa Ulloa. 1994. Seed plants of the high Andes of Ecuador---A checklist. AAU Rep. 34: 1–443.
3. Jørgensen, P. M. & S. León-Yánez. (eds.) 1999. Catalogue of the vascular plants of Ecuador. Monogr. Syst. Bot. Missouri Bot. Gard. 75: i–viii, 1–1181.
4. Luteyn, J. L. 1999. Páramos, a checklist of plant diversity, geographical distribution, and botanical literature. Mem. New York Bot. Gard. 84: viii–xv, 1–278.
5. Macbride, J. F. 1959. Haloragaceae, Flora of Peru. Publ. Field Mus. Nat. Hist., Bot. Ser. 13(5/1): 3–8.
6. Marticorena, C. & M. Quezada. 1985. Catálogo de la Flora Vascular de Chile. Gayana, Bot. 42: 1–157.
7. Mora-Osejo, L. 1984. Haloragaceae. 3: 1–178. In P. Pinto-Escobar & P. M. Ruiz (eds.) Fl. Colombia. Universidad Nacional de Colombia, Santafé de Bogotá.
8. Zuloaga, F. O., O. Morrone, M. J. Belgrano, C. Marticorena & E. Marchesi. (eds.) 2008. Catálogo de las Plantas Vasculares del Cono Sur (Argentina, Sur de Brasil, Chile, Paraguay y Uruguay). Monogr. Syst. Bot. Missouri Bot. Gard. 107(1): i–xcvi, 1–983; 107(2): i–xx, 985–2286; 107(3): i–xxi, 2287–3348.
