= Gunnera aequatoriensis =

Conservation status
- Vulnerable (IUCN 3.1)

Scientific classification
- Kingdom: Plantae
- Clade: Tracheophytes
- Clade: Angiosperms
- Clade: Eudicots
- Order: Gunnerales
- Family: Gunneraceae
- Genus: Gunnera
- Species: G. aequatoriensis

Binomial name
- Gunnera aequatoriensis L.E.Mora

Species of flowering plant

Gunnera aequatoriensis is a species of plant in the family Gunneraceae. It is endemic to Ecuador. Its natural habitat is subtropical or tropical moist montane forests.
