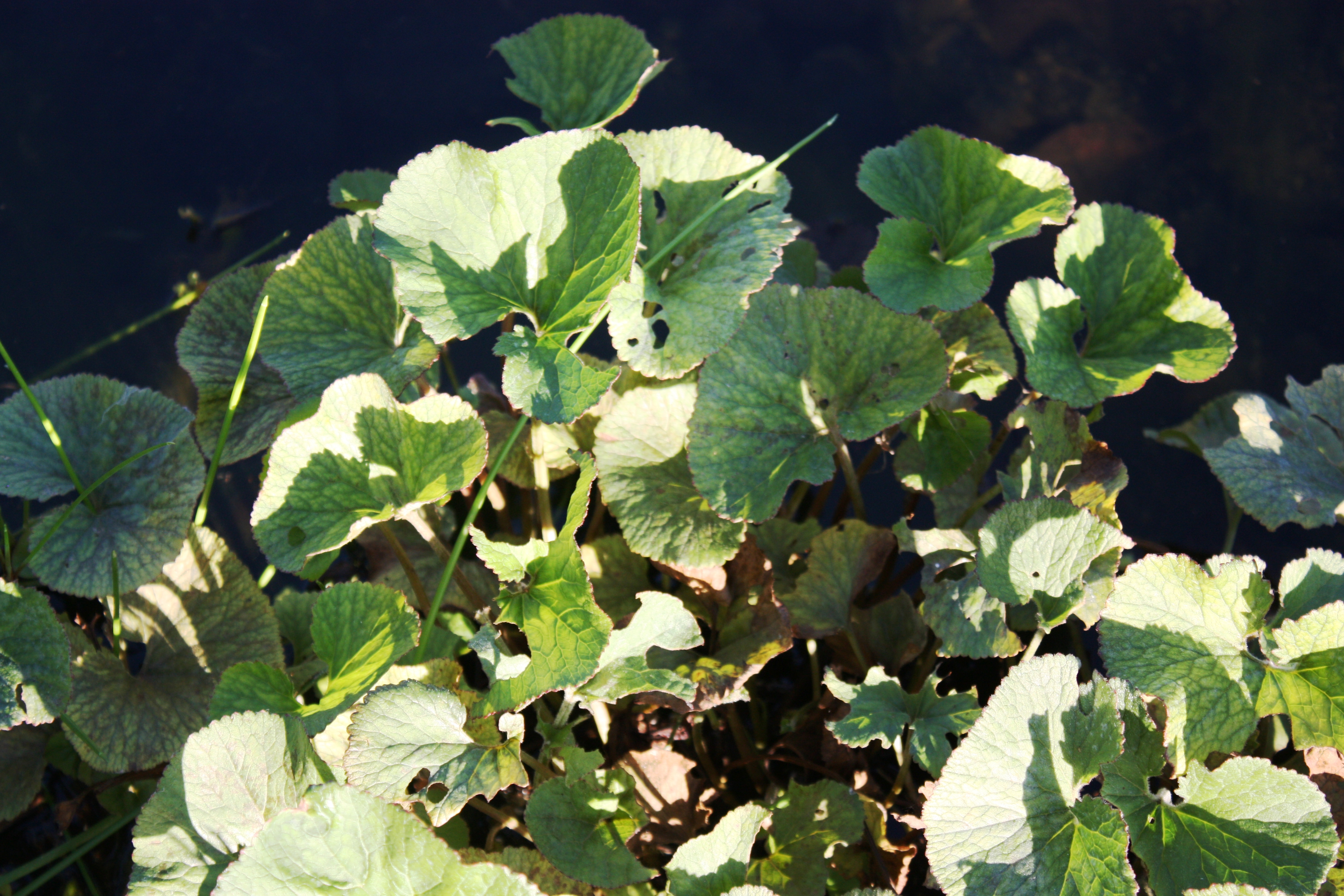

Scientific classification
- Kingdom: Plantae
- Clade: Tracheophytes
- Clade: Angiosperms
- Clade: Eudicots
- Order: Gunnerales
- Family: Gunneraceae
- Genus: Gunnera
- Species: G. perpensa

Binomial name
- Gunnera perpensa L.

= Gunnera perpensa =

Species of flowering plant

Gunnera perpensa is a species of Gunnera native to much of eastern and southern Africa, from Sudan south to South Africa, and also in Madagascar. It is a perennial herbaceous wetland plant growing to 1 m tall, with kidney-shaped leaves with an irregularly lobed and serrated margin.

It is the type species of the genus Gunnera.
