= Gunnera magnifica =

Scientific classification
- Kingdom: Plantae
- Clade: Tracheophytes
- Clade: Angiosperms
- Clade: Eudicots
- Order: Gunnerales
- Family: Gunneraceae
- Genus: Gunnera
- Species: G. magnifica

Binomial name
- Gunnera magnifica H.St.John

Species of plant

Gunnera magnifica, commonly called hoja de pantano, is a large herbaceous shrub or tree-like plant native to the montane rainforests of the Colombian Andes in Caldas Province. It can grow as tall as 4.7 m (15 ft). The lower stem is decumbent and rhizomatous, while the upper stem curves upright and palm-like. This pachycaul stem is up to 40 cm (16 in) thick. At the top is a rosette of huge leaves, the blade, or lamina of which is 92–115 cm (36–45 in) long by up to 184 cm (72 in) in across. The stalk, or petiole is up to 2.4 m (7 ft 10 in) in length and 8 to 10 cm (3.1 to 3.9 in) in thickness. These huge leaves emerge from a bud up to 60 cm (24 in) long by up to 40 cm (16 in) wide; the largest leaf bud of any known plant. The panicle of red, dimerous (two sepals, two petals, two stamens, and a two styled pistil) flowers, panicle and pedicel combined, is up to 2.7 m (8 ft 10 in) in height. The bud scales covering the terminal bud are long, slender, branched with filamentous side branches, 10–39 cm (3.9–15.4 in) long 4–7.5 cm (1.6–3.0 in) wide, the largest of any known plant.
