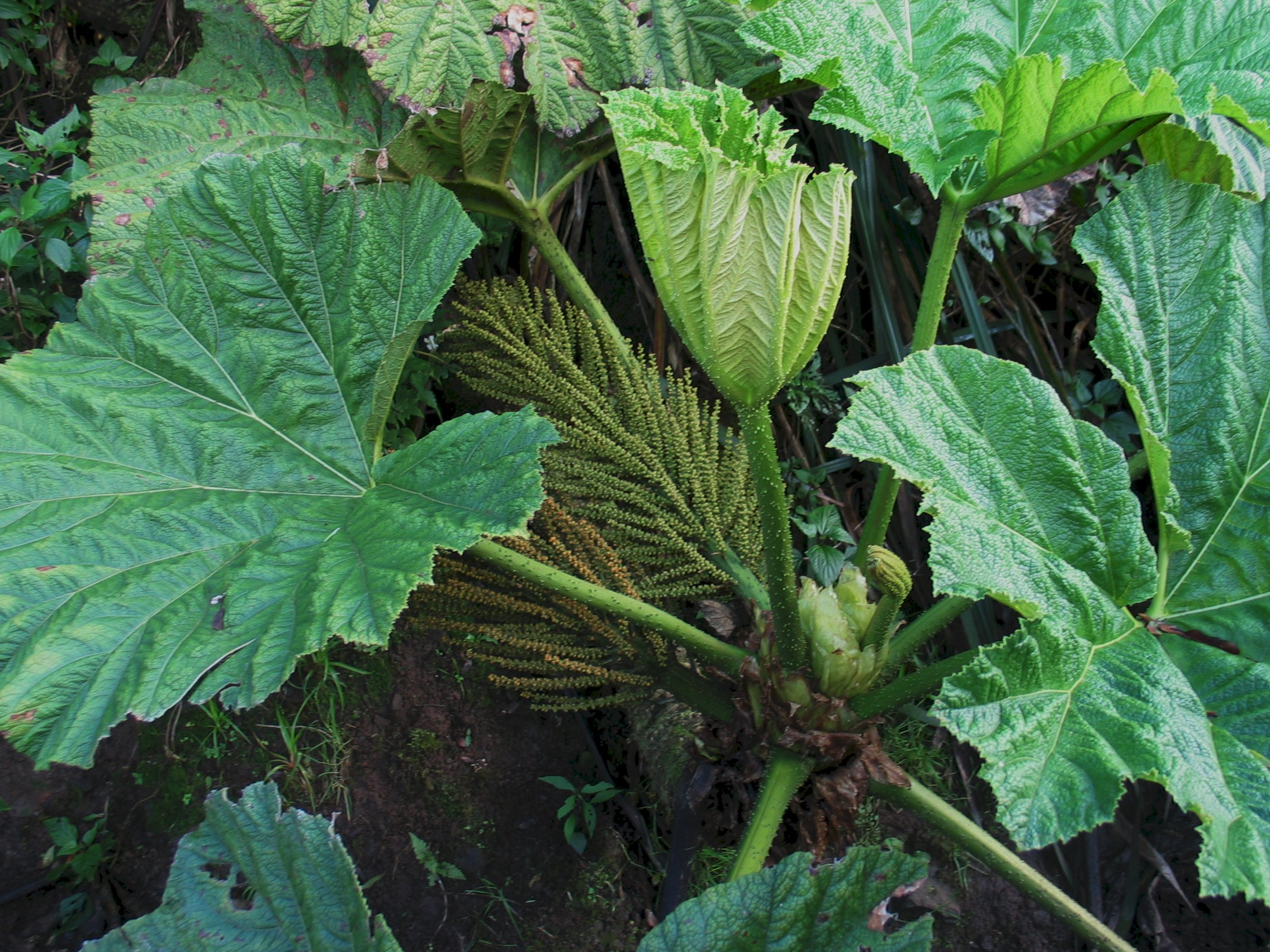

Conservation status
- Imperiled (NatureServe)

Scientific classification
- Kingdom: Plantae
- Clade: Tracheophytes
- Clade: Angiosperms
- Clade: Eudicots
- Order: Gunnerales
- Family: Gunneraceae
- Genus: Gunnera
- Species: G. petaloidea

Binomial name
- Gunnera petaloidea Gaudich.

= Gunnera petaloidea =

Species of plant

Gunnera petaloidea is a species of Gunnera endemic to Hawaii on the islands Kauai, Oahu, Molokai, Maui, and Hawaii. It is found on slopes which receive heavy precipitation at an altitude between 700–1,830 m (2,300–6,000 ft) but mostly between 920–1,300 m (3,020–4,270 ft). The Hawaiian name for this plant is ʻape or ʻapeʻape.

== Description ==
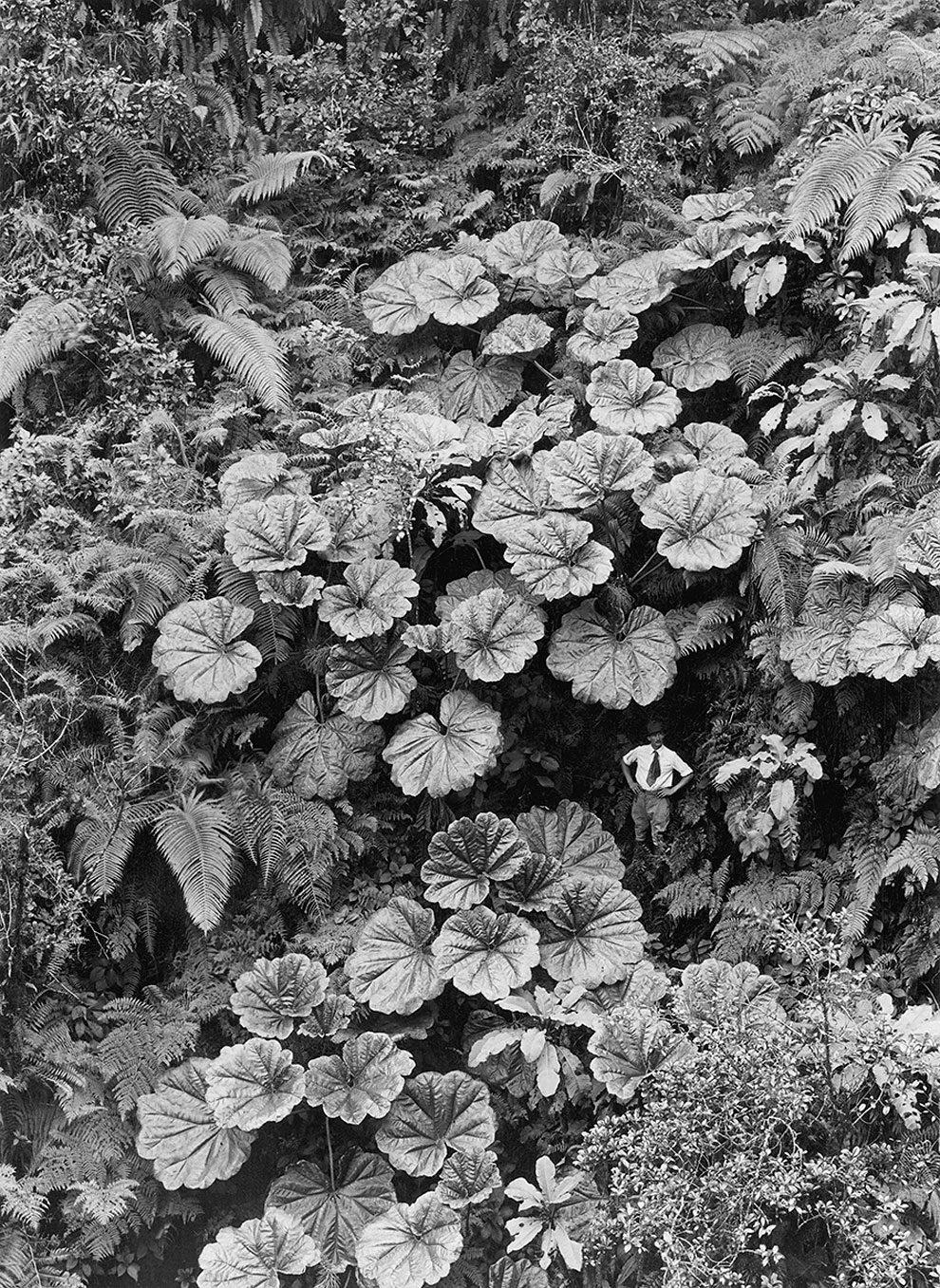
'Ape'ape trees on Maui, with man for scale, 1924

Gunnera petaloidea is a perennial herb growing to 1–6 m (3 ft 3 in – 19 ft 8 in) tall. Unlike the related Gunnera kauaiensis (endemic on Kauai), it has leaves that are not peltate; the leaves are 40–100 cm (16–39 in) long and 20–90 cm (8–35 in) wide on fleshy stalks that are 20–100 cm (8–39 in) long and 8–10 cm (3–4 in) in diameter. The stalks grow from a green rhizome that is 180–240 cm (6–8 ft) long and 10–13 cm (4–5 in) in diameter. The rhizome is branched and can stand 50–120 cm (1.5–4 ft) above the soil. The plant forms clonal colonies that can cover areas up to 30 m (100 ft) long by 6 m (20 ft) or more wide.

The flowers bloom in mid-summer and grow from a branched stalk that is 60–90 cm (2–3 ft) tall with 10–23 cm (4–9 in) long branches. Petals are 2–6 mm (0.079–0.236 in) long and grow in pairs. The stamen also come in pairs that are 2 mm (0.079 in) long and are positioned opposite the petals.
