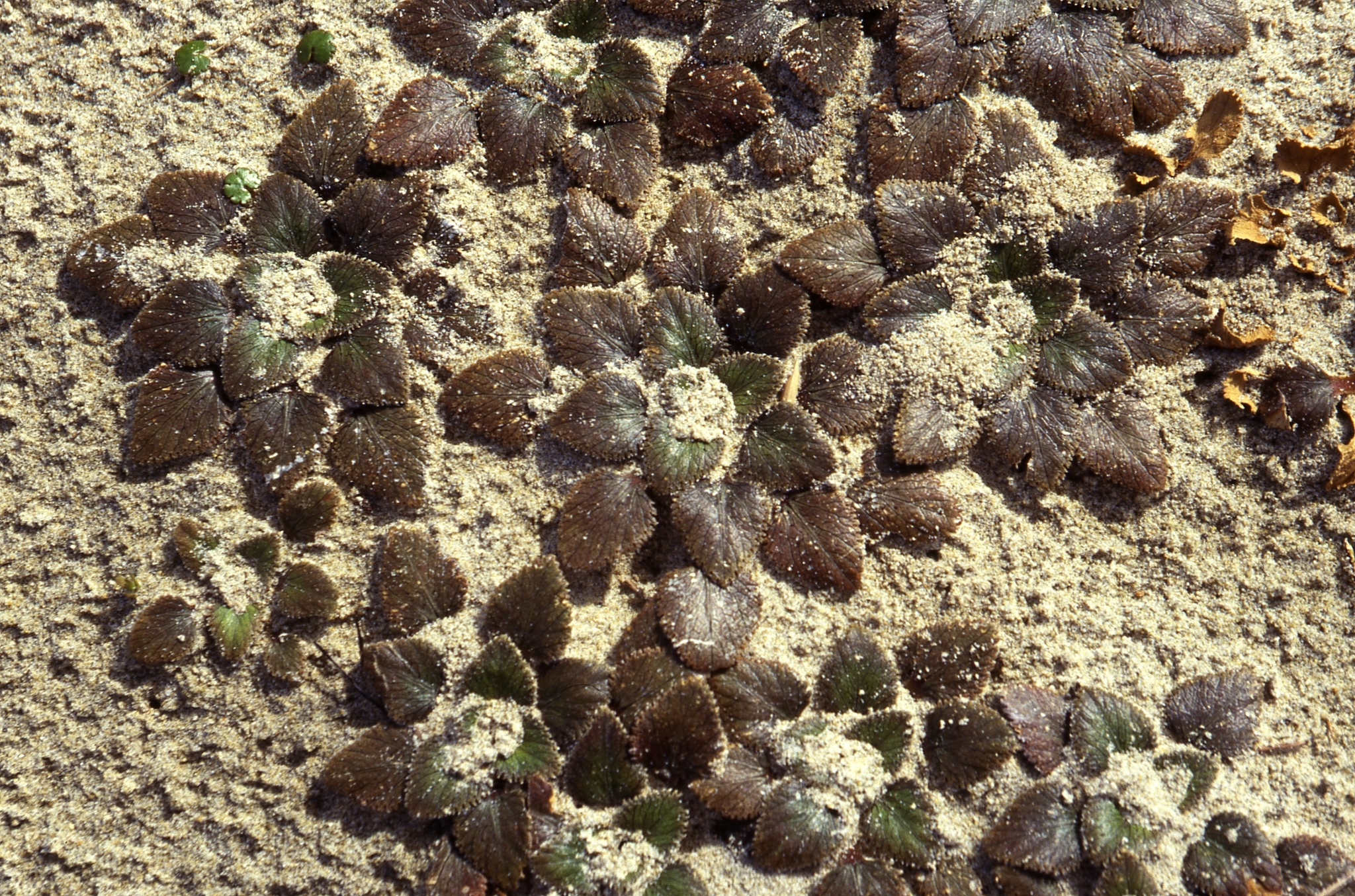
- Gunnera hamiltonii at the Rakiura National Park

Conservation status
- Nationally Critical (NZ TCS)

Scientific classification
- Kingdom: Plantae
- Clade: Tracheophytes
- Clade: Angiosperms
- Clade: Eudicots
- Order: Gunnerales
- Family: Gunneraceae
- Genus: Gunnera
- Species: G. hamiltonii

Binomial name
- Gunnera hamiltonii Kirk

= Gunnera hamiltonii =

Species of flowering plant

Gunnera hamiltonii is a creeping herbaceous plant in the family Gunneraceae that is endemic to the South Island and Stewart Island of New Zealand. It has clusters of small (2 to 7 cm) grey-brown leaves forming a dense mat. Small yellow flowers are followed by red berries in the autumn.

== Taxonomy ==
Gunnera hamiltonii is a creeping herbaceous plant in the family Gunneraceae. It was described in 1888 by New Zealand botanist Thomas Kirk in an article by Southland resident William Stewart Hamilton, for whom the species is named.

== Description ==
Gunnera hamiltonii is a creeping herbaceous plant with clusters of small (2 to 7 cm) grey-brown leaves forming a dense mat. It has small yellow flowers and fruits that are red berries.

== Distribution and habitat ==
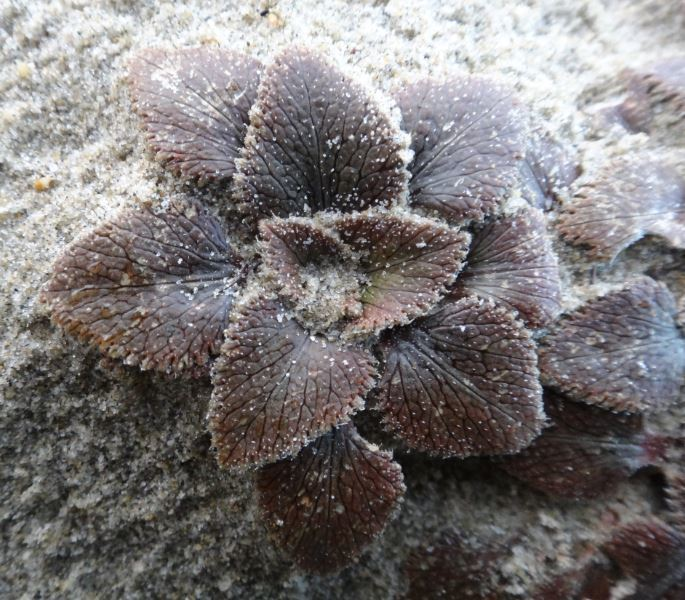
Leaves of G. hamiltonii

G. hamiltonii is endemic to New Zealand, found in Southland, South Island and Stewart Island / Rakiura. It is found in damp sand in coastal, sparsely vegetated dune slacks and swales.

== Conservation status ==
It is classified as "Threatened - Nationally Critical" in the New Zealand Threatened Classification System, with the qualifiers CD (Conservation Dependent), RR (Range Restricted), and RF (Recruitment Failure).

It is one of the rarest plants in New Zealand, with only five suspected remaining natural habitats. Natural fertilisation of these plants is now difficult as the male and female plants are separate. There was no fruit or seed produced in wild populations studied in 1996.
