= Gunnera masafuerae =

Scientific classification
- Kingdom: Plantae
- Clade: Tracheophytes
- Clade: Angiosperms
- Clade: Eudicots
- Order: Gunnerales
- Family: Gunneraceae
- Genus: Gunnera
- Species: G. masafuerae

Binomial name
- Gunnera masafuerae Skottsb.

Species of flowering plant

Gunnera masafuerae, common name pangue, is a very large herbaceous plant endemic to Alejandro Selkirk Island (Más Afuera) in the Juan Fernandez Islands. It is the second largest species in the genus after Gunnera manicata. The blade, or lamina is up to 9 feet 5 inches (2.87 m) wide borne upon massive stalks, or petioles up to 4.75 inches (12.1 cm) thick; the thickest of any dicot. The inflorescence is a panicle composed of many tiny dimerous flowers (i.e. having two sepals, two petals, two stamens and two stigmas), and is up to 5 feet 9 inches (1.75 m) long.

This is one of the three Gunnera species endemic to Juan Fernandez Islands, the other two being Gunnera bracteata and Gunnera peltata.
