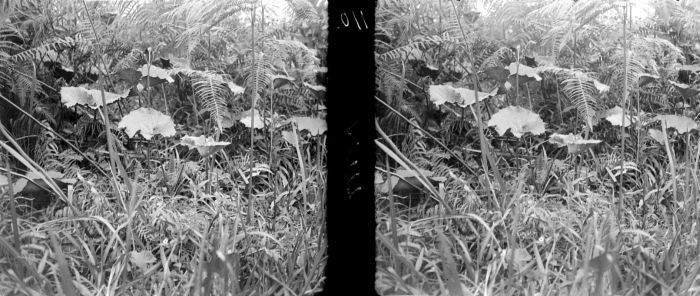

Scientific classification
- Kingdom: Plantae
- Clade: Tracheophytes
- Clade: Angiosperms
- Clade: Eudicots
- Order: Gunnerales
- Family: Gunneraceae
- Genus: Gunnera
- Species: G. macrophylla

Binomial name
- Gunnera macrophylla Blume

= Gunnera macrophylla =

Species of flowering plant

Gunnera macrophylla, is a species of Gunnera found in Papuasia, Indonesia, and the Philippines.
