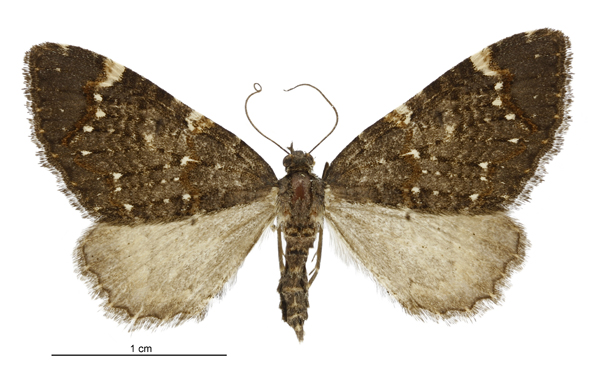
- Female
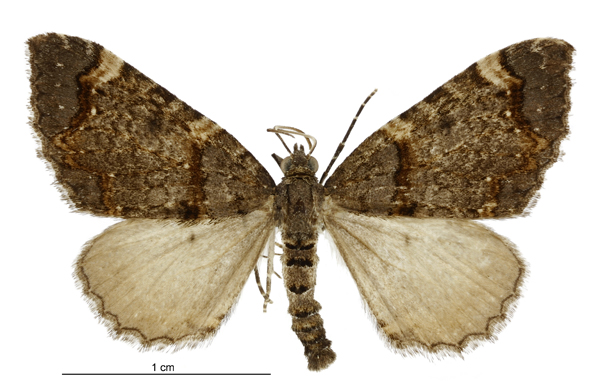
- Male

Scientific classification
- Kingdom: Animalia
- Phylum: Arthropoda
- Class: Insecta
- Order: Lepidoptera
- Family: Geometridae
- Genus: Hydriomena
- Species: H. arida

Binomial name
- Hydriomena arida (Butler, 1879)

Synonyms
- Melanthia arida Butler, 1879; Cidaria chaotica Meyrick, 1883; Cidaria arida (Butler, 1879)

= Hydriomena arida =

Species of moth endemic to New Zealand

Hydriomena arida, also known as the Gunnera carpet moth, is a species of moth in the family Geometridae. It was first described by Arthur Gardiner Butler in 1879. This species is endemic to New Zealand. It is found in both the South and Stewart Islands where it inhabits native forest. It has been observed at up to 3000 ft. Larvae feed on Gunnera monoica. Adults of this species are on the wing from December until February and are nocturnal and attracted to light. This species is regarded as being uncommon.

== Taxonomy ==
This species was first described by Arthur Gardiner Butler in 1879 using specimens collected by Frederick Wollaston Hutton in Dunedin and named Melanthia arida. In 1883 Edward Meyrick, thinking he was describing a new species, named this species as Cidaria chaotica. Meyrick synonymised this name into Cidaria arida in 1884. George Hudson discussed and illustrated this species under the name Hydriomena arida in both his 1898 book New Zealand moths and butterflies (Macro-lepidoptera) and his 1928 book The butterflies and moths of New Zealand. It has been hypothesised that species belongs to another genus and so this species is also currently known as Hydriomena (s.l.) arida. In 1971 John S. Dugdale suggested this species may fall within the genus Cephalissa but in 1988 kept the current placement of this species. The male holotype specimen is held at the Natural History Museum, London.

== Description ==
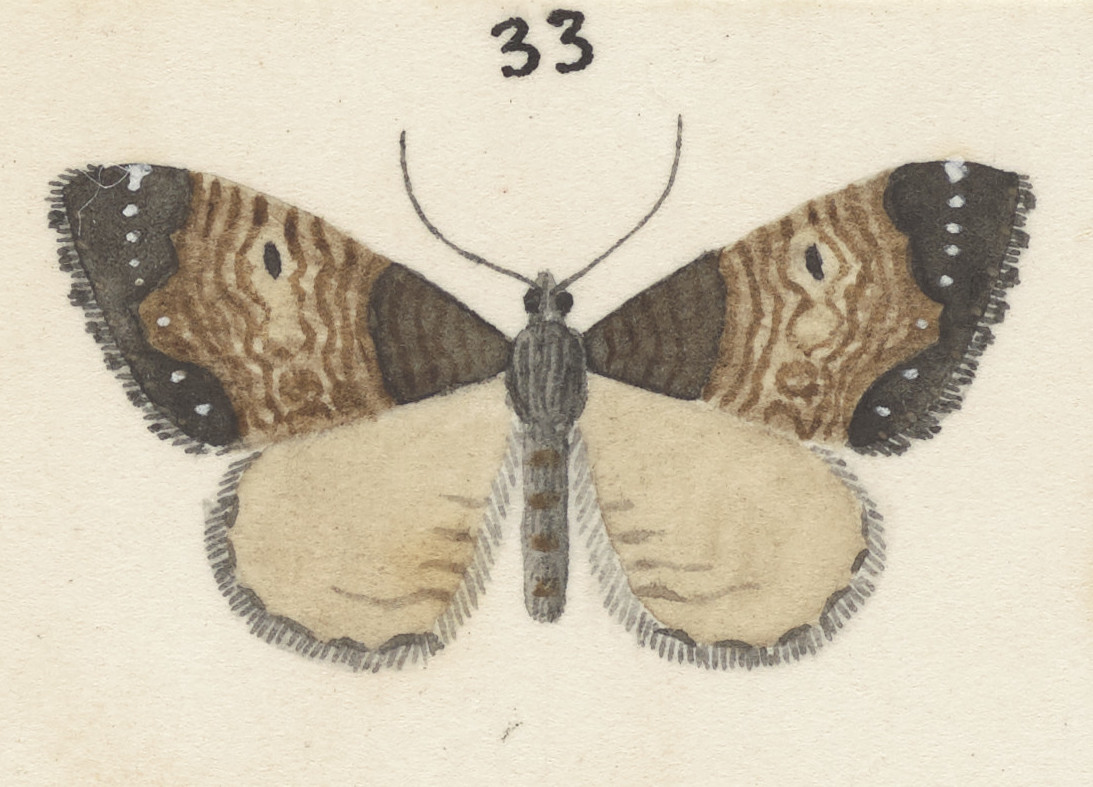
Illustration of H. arida.

Hudson described this species as follows:

The expansion of the wings is 1 1/8 inches. The fore-wings are dark blackish-grey; there are two small cream-coloured patches on the costa at 1/3 and 2/3 continued across the wing as two curved series of small cream-coloured spots; there is a subterminal series of whitish dots. In most specimens there is a very broad paler brown median band with a rounded projection below the middle almost touching the termen; this band is traversed by numerous fine wavy dark brown transverse lines and contains a conspicuous discal dot. The hind-wings are very pale brownish-grey or creamy-grey; all the cilia are nearly black.

This species is variable in appearance. Hudson goes on to say that this species can be distinguished from similar appearing species as its forewings are very darkly coloured but have a broad often paler median band.

== Distribution ==
This species is endemic to New Zealand. This species occurs in the South and Stewart Islands. A specimen has also been collected from Arapawa Island in the Marlborough Sounds in July. This species is regarded as being rare. In 1988 it was reported as being locally extinct in Dunedin. However in February 2022 a specimen was observed in Port Chalmers.

== Habitat and hosts ==
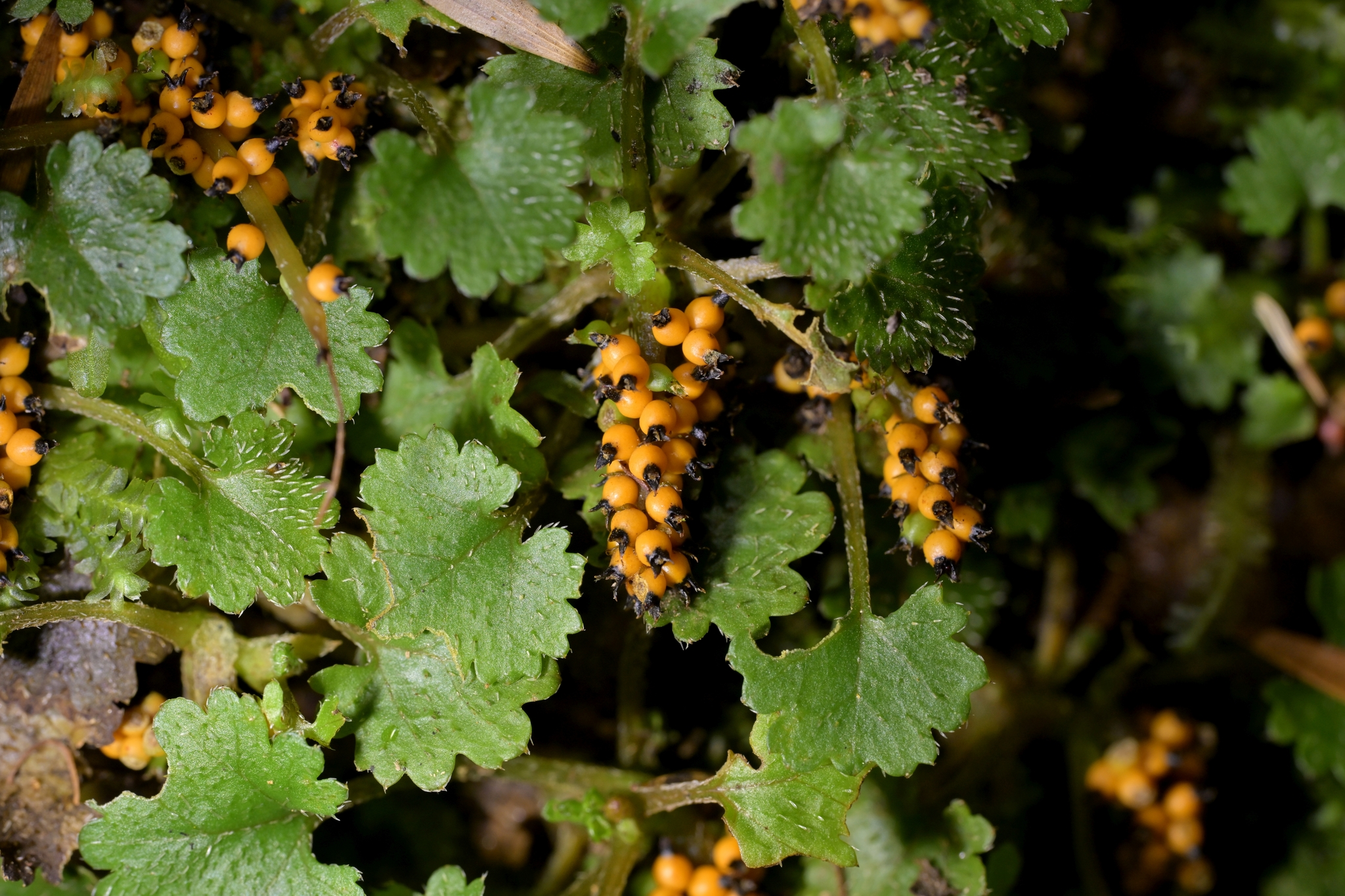
Larval host Gunnera monoica.

This species inhabits native forest and has been found at altitudes of between 1500 and 3000 ft. The larval host of this species is Gunnera monoica.

== Behaviour ==
The adults of this species are on the wing most commonly from October until February and attracted to light.
