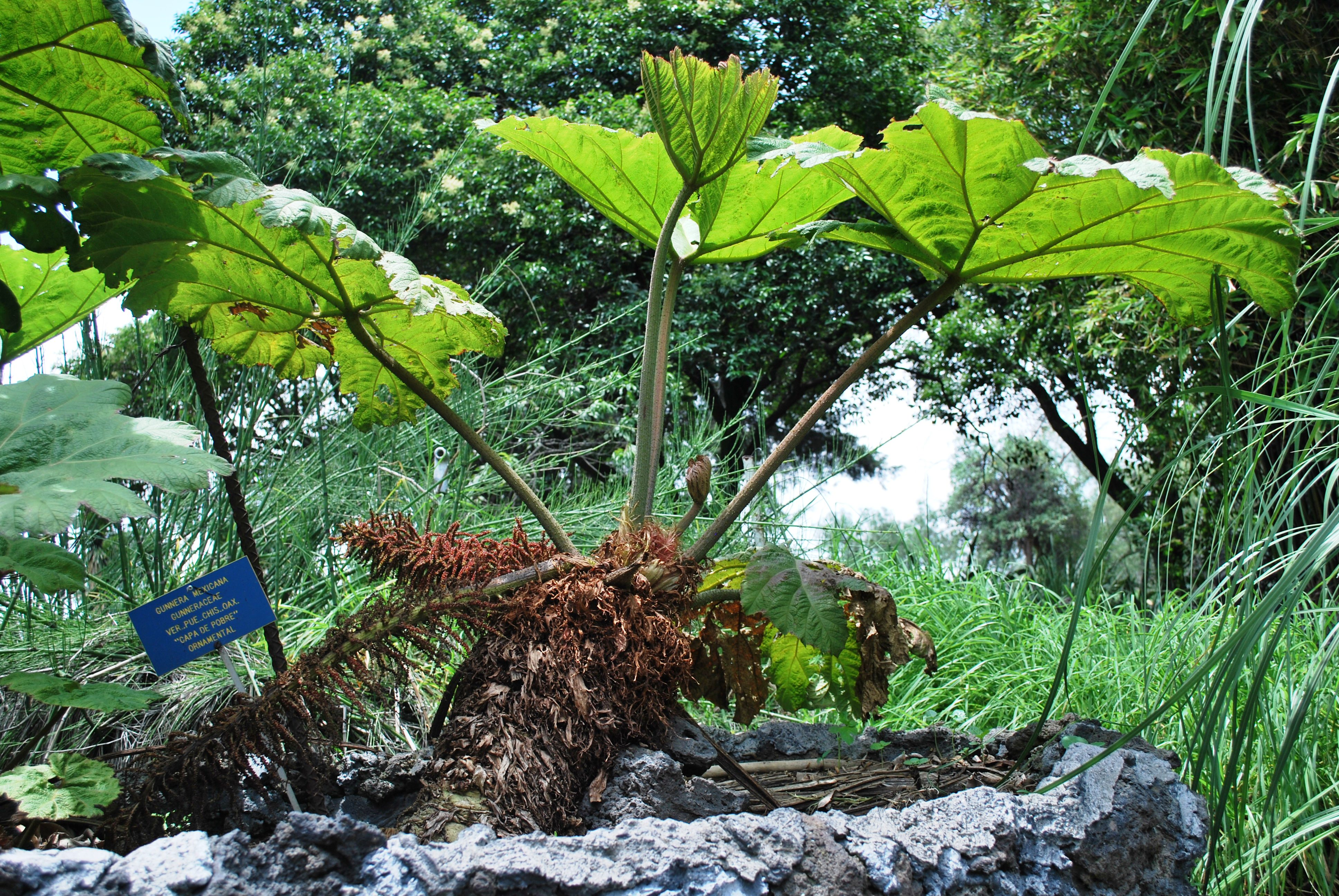

Scientific classification
- Kingdom: Plantae
- Clade: Tracheophytes
- Clade: Angiosperms
- Clade: Eudicots
- Order: Gunnerales
- Family: Gunneraceae
- Genus: Gunnera
- Species: G. mexicana

Binomial name
- Gunnera mexicana Brandegee

= Gunnera mexicana =

Species of flowering plant

Gunnera mexicana, is a species of Gunnera found in Veracruz, Mexico.
