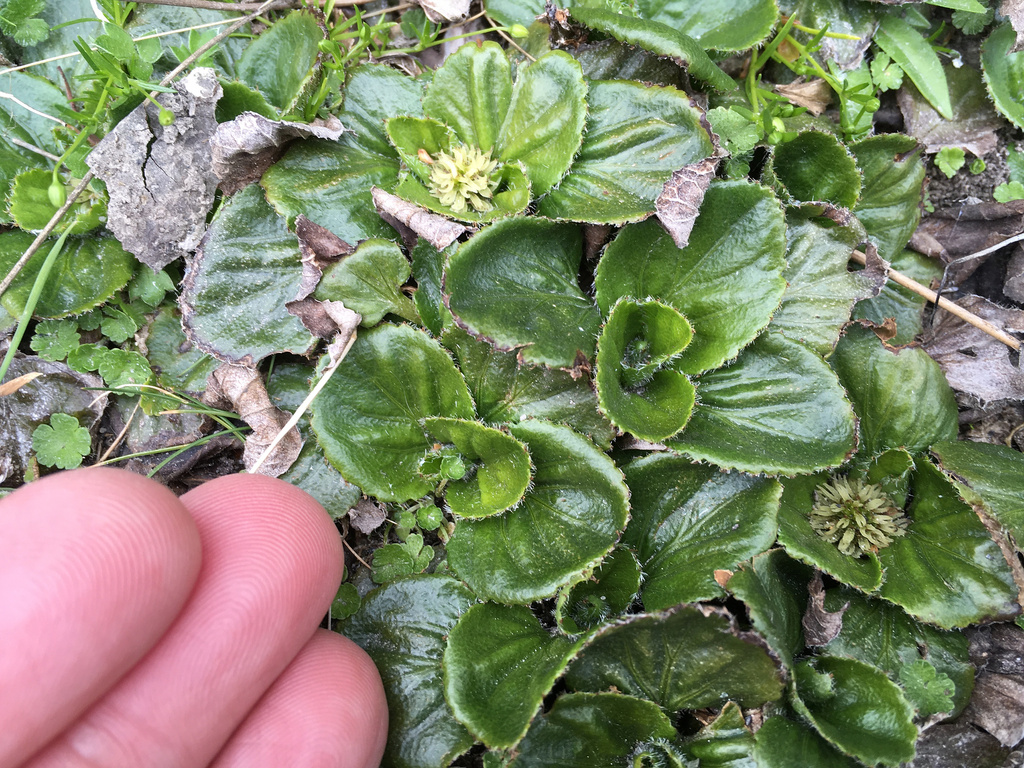
- Gunnera cordifolia expressing some female flowers

Scientific classification
- Kingdom: Plantae
- Clade: Tracheophytes
- Clade: Angiosperms
- Clade: Eudicots
- Order: Gunnerales
- Family: Gunneraceae
- Genus: Gunnera
- Species: G. cordifolia

Binomial name
- Gunnera cordifolia Hook.f., 1857
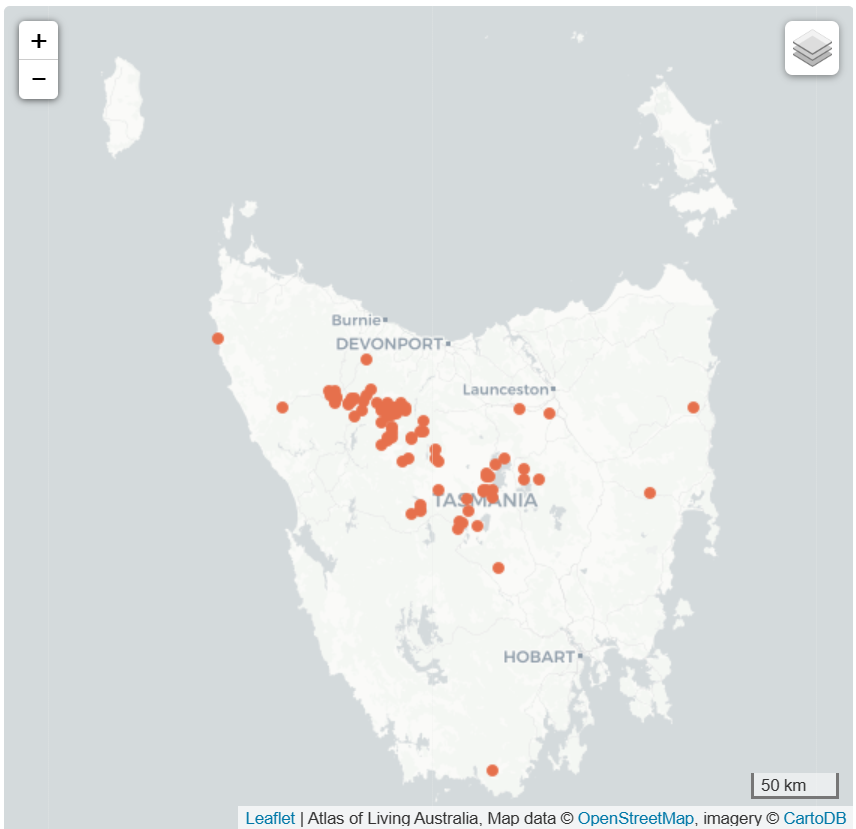
- Range of Gunnera cordifolia provided by Atlas of Living Australia

= Gunnera cordifolia =

Species of flowering plant

Gunnera cordifolia, often referred to as Tasmanian mudleaf, is an endemic core eudicot of Tasmania, Australia. It is one of 63 species pertaining to the Gunnera genus of herbaceous flowering plants. G. cordifolia can be easily identified by its dark olive-green, heart shaped leaves. It is predominantly found growing in sub-alpine boglands, or in wet grassy areas as a perennial ground cover.

== Description ==
Gunnera cordifolia is found in highland grassy sedgeland and comprises less than 5% of the area's total coverage. It is found in wet and boggy areas and seems to thrive in the shelter of tussocks and other sedges. G. cordifolia belongs to the subgenus Milligania which contains 7 species across New Zealand. It is the only species of Gunnera that is found in Tasmania.

Unlike its cousins in the subgenus Panke that can grow to gigantic heights of 2.5m, G. cordifolia prefers to grow close to the ground to a maximum height of 5cm. It forms thick mat-like ground cover.

Gunnera cordifolia has thick, glossy, dark green to olive-green leaves. The leaf margins are cordate with fine white hairs. The leaves have evident palmate venation, or veins, that branch near the margins.

When flowering, typically between November and December, male and female flowers are on separate stems. The male flowers are as tall as or bigger than the leaves, while the female flowers are clustered together and much shorter than the leaves. Small, round, red fruit between 2-3mm will appear from December to July.
