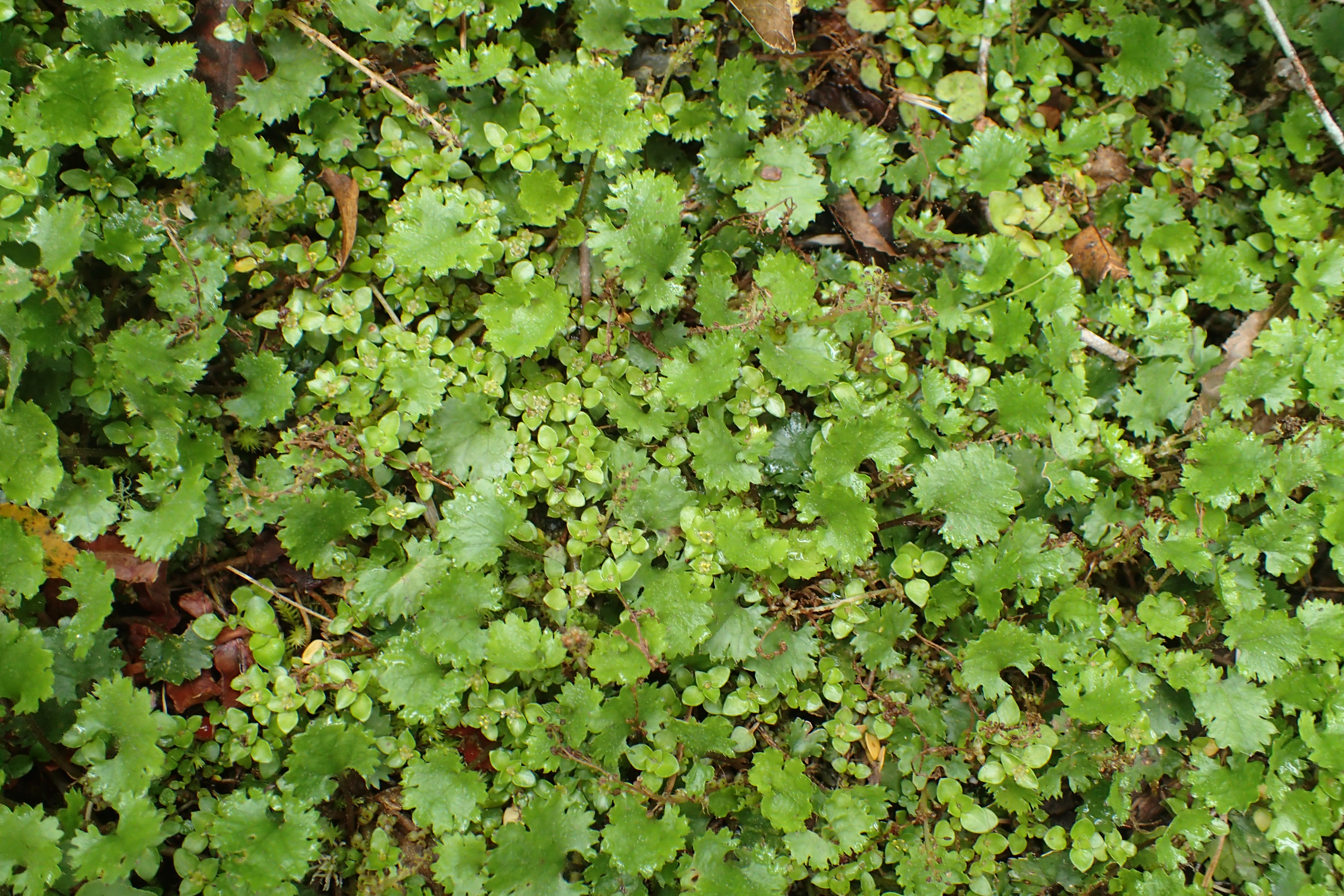

Scientific classification
- Kingdom: Plantae
- Clade: Tracheophytes
- Clade: Angiosperms
- Clade: Eudicots
- Order: Gunnerales
- Family: Gunneraceae
- Genus: Gunnera
- Species: G. monoica

Binomial name
- Gunnera monoica Raoul, E. (1844)

Synonyms
- Gunnera mixta Kirk

= Gunnera monoica =

Species of flowering plant

Gunnera monoica is a species of Gunnera endemic to New Zealand. It is one of the smallest species of Gunnera, with leaves of around 3 cm (1.2 in) wide. It spreads by forming stolons in damp ground.

== Description ==
G. monoica flowers between October and November, and produces fruit from December until February. The flowers are greenish, and the fruit is barrel shaped and white in colour (although some varieties may have purple or red flecks). The leaves have a rounded appearance and either a corrugated or spiky margin. The species is visually similar to Gunnera strigosa, but with differences in the leaf shape and hair distribution. The fruits are small, only 2 millimetres in length, and red to reddish-yellow. It grows in moist, lowland forests and grasslands. It is evergreen.

== Range ==
Gunnera monoica is native to New Zealand. It can be found on damp banks and old road cuttings.

== Bibliography ==
- Armitage, James (2012), "Gunnera great and small", The Garden, 137 (9), Royal Horticultural Society
- Stock, Paul (2002), "Fixation with Gunnera", New Zealand Garden Journal, 5 (2): 12–14
