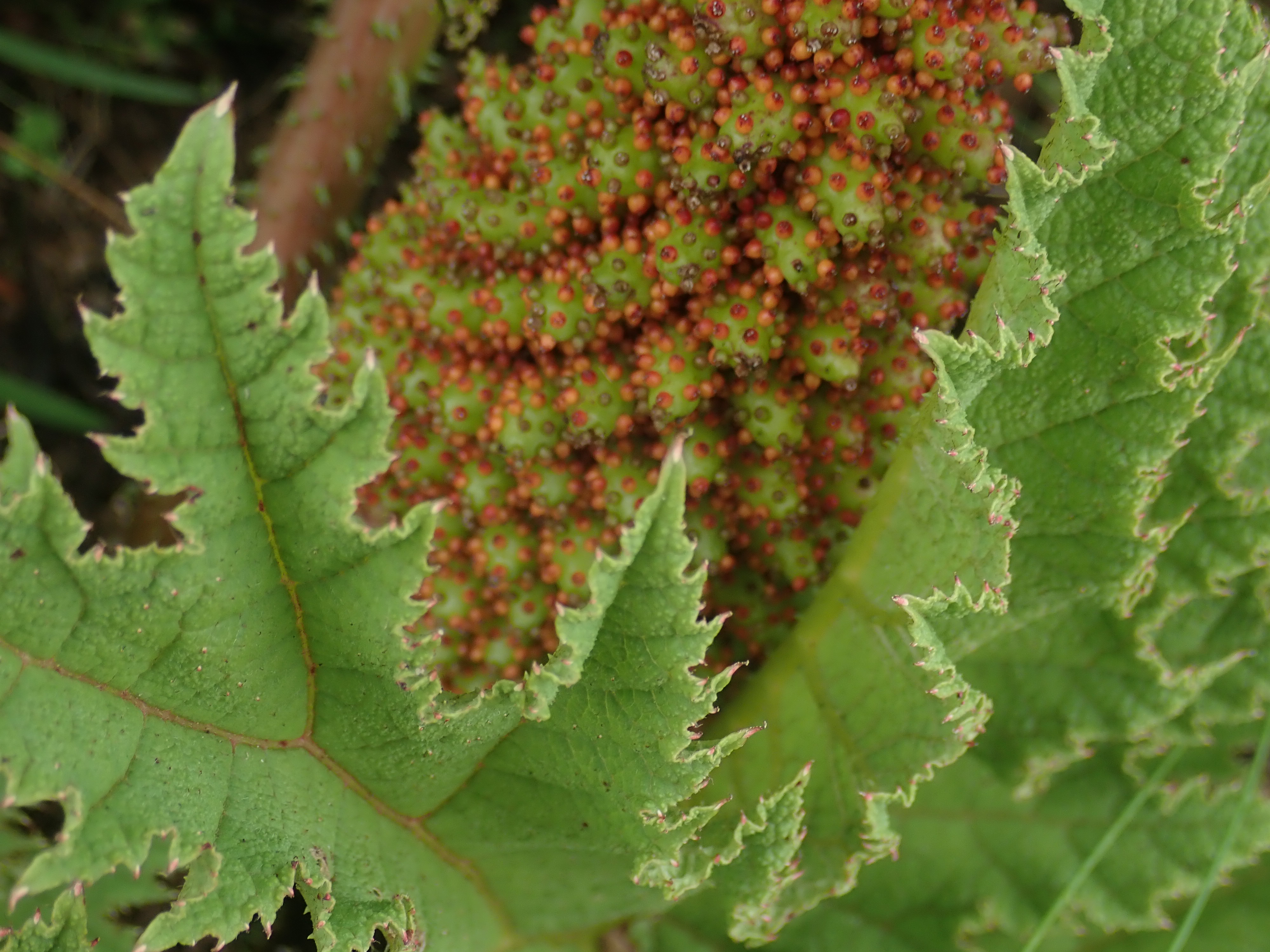

Scientific classification
- Kingdom: Plantae
- Clade: Embryophytes
- Clade: Tracheophytes
- Clade: Spermatophytes
- Clade: Angiosperms
- Clade: Eudicots
- Order: Gunnerales
- Family: Gunneraceae
- Genus: Gunnera
- Species: G. tinctoria

Binomial name
- Gunnera tinctoria (Molina) Mirb.

Synonyms
- Gunnera scabra Ruiz & Pav.; Panke tinctoria Molina

= Gunnera tinctoria =

Species of flowering plant

Gunnera tinctoria, known as giant-rhubarb, Chilean rhubarb, quirusilla or nalca, is a flowering plant species native to southern Chile and neighboring zones in Argentina and Bolivia. It is not closely related to rhubarb, as the two plants belong to different orders, but looks similar from a distance and has similar culinary uses. It is a large-leaved perennial plant that grows to more than 2 m (6.6 ft) tall. It has been introduced to many parts of the world as an ornamental plant. In some countries, such as New Zealand, the United Kingdom, and Ireland, it has spread from gardens and is becoming an introduced species of concern. It is known under the synonyms Gunnera chilensis Lam. and Gunnera scabra Ruiz & Pav.

== Taxonomy ==
It was first described in 1782 by Juan Ignacio Molina as Panke tinctoria, and was transferred to the genus Gunnera in 1805 by Charles-François Brisseau de Mirbel.

== Description ==
Gunnera tinctoria is a giant, clump-forming herbaceous perennial. The leaves can grow up to 2.5 m (8.2 ft) across, cordate and palmate with up to 9-lobed margins. The stems are covered in numerous spikes. It has erect panicles of cone-shaped inflorescences weighing as much as 14 kg (30 lb) growing to 1 m (3.3 ft) in height from spring to early summer, with small dimerous flowers. The fruit is orange. The number of seeds is estimated from 80,000 per seedhead to 250,000 per plant.

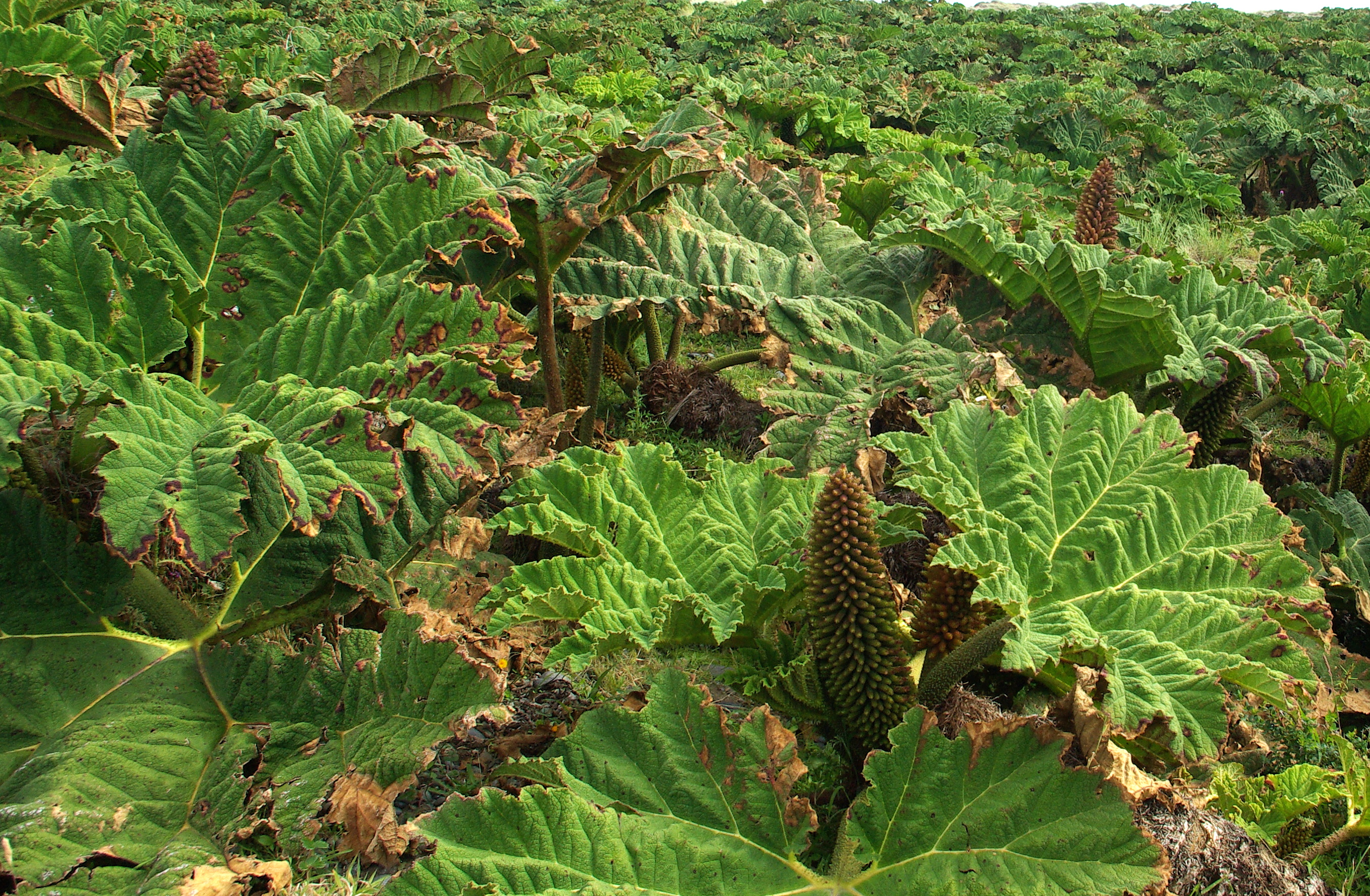
Gunnera tinctoria flowering on the coast of Chiloé Island, Chile

== Habitat ==
Gunnera tinctoria grows near streams and roadsides.

== Uses ==
In its native Chile, where it is called nalca or pangue, it is used in a similar way to European rhubarb: after peeling, the stalks are eaten fresh or cooked into jam or cordial. The leaves are used in the preparation of the traditional Chilean dish curanto. The roots are also traditionally used to tan leather and as a black dye. The species is seldom cultivated. Instead, the stalks are gathered from the wild and informally commercialised by local people known as nalqueros.

== As an invasive species ==
In parts of New Zealand, Chilean rhubarb has become a recognised pest plant; in Taranaki, on the western coast of North Island, it has spread to riparian zones and riverbeds, coastal cliffs, and forest margins, thus placing the species on the National Pest Plant Accord. Under Section 52 and 53 of the Biosecurity Act, it is an offence in New Zealand to knowingly propagate, distribute, spread, sell or otherwise offer for possession. In Great Britain, the species was popular amongst gardeners for decades, but became rather well-established, and sometimes problematic, in western districts, and appeared to be spreading. In the west of Ireland, G. tinctoria is a major invasive species, in particular on Achill Island and on the Corraun Peninsula, County Mayo. Its large leaves create dense shade, preventing other species from germinating or growing.

Chilean rhubarb is classified in the European Union as an invasive species of Union concern, and it is illegal to import, grow, or sell it within the EU.

In the United Kingdom, the plant was classified under Schedule 9 of the Wildlife and Countryside Act 1981 as an invasive species. While it remained legal to cultivate privately, it was made illegal to allow the species to spread outside the bounds of one's property, or to deliberately sow it elsewhere.

== Similar species ==
A similar species is Gunnera manicata (Brazilian giant rhubarb). This species may also be invasive.

== In popular culture ==
In October 2019, photos of a produce vendor in Puerto Montt dressing himself in nalca leaves began circulating on Chilean social media under the name "Nalcaman". Because these photos were being shared around the same time as the beginning of the 2019–20 Chilean protests, Nalcaman has since become an element of the iconography surrounding Chile's anti-government protests.

== Gallery ==
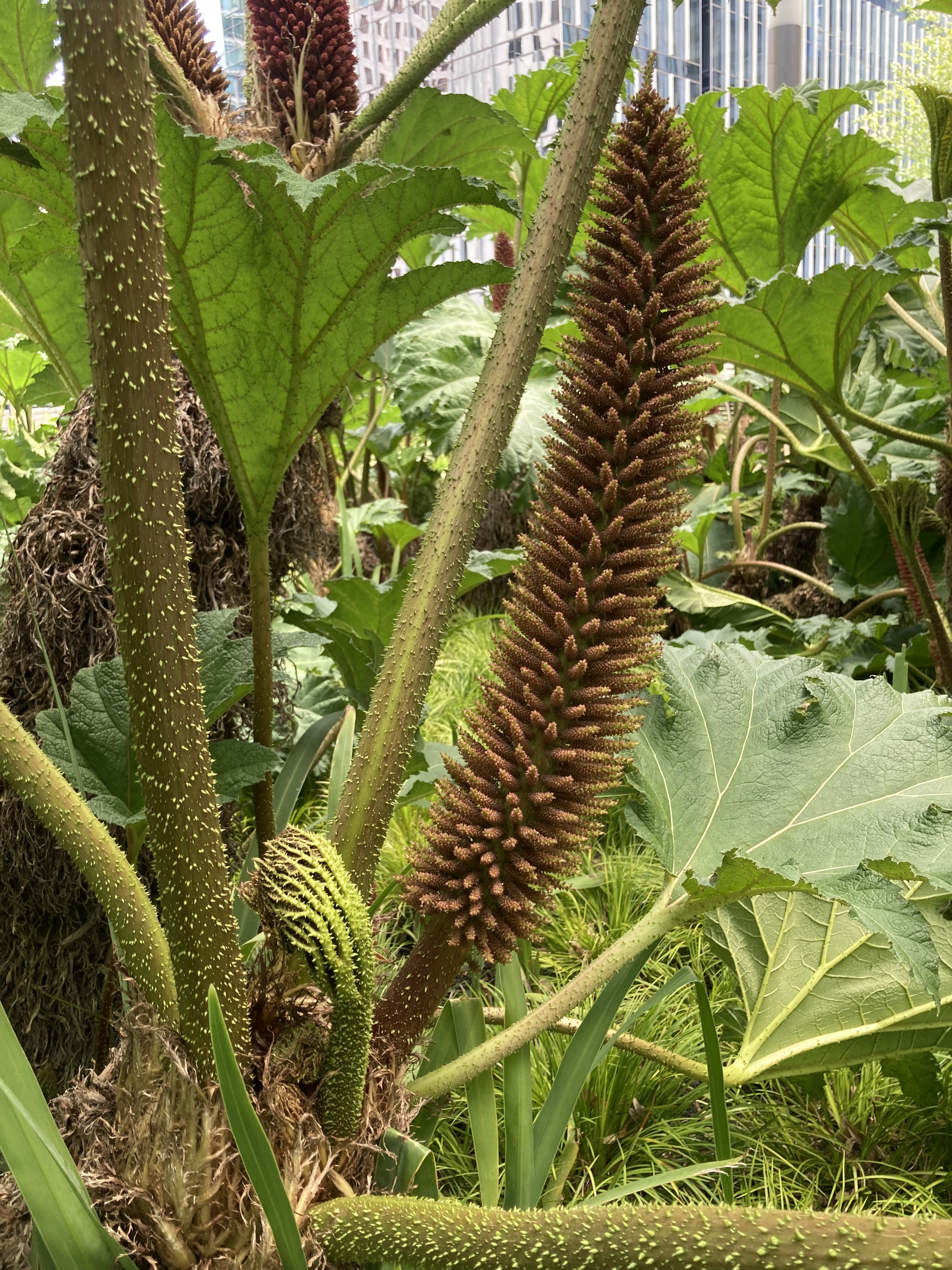
Panicle and leaves at Salesforce Park.

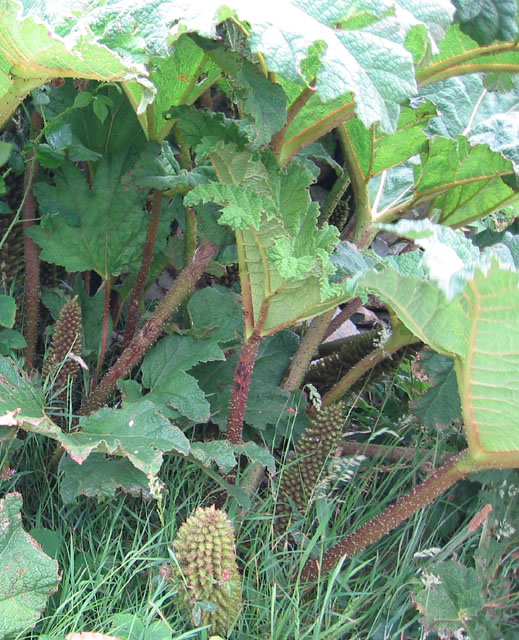
Red leaf stalks

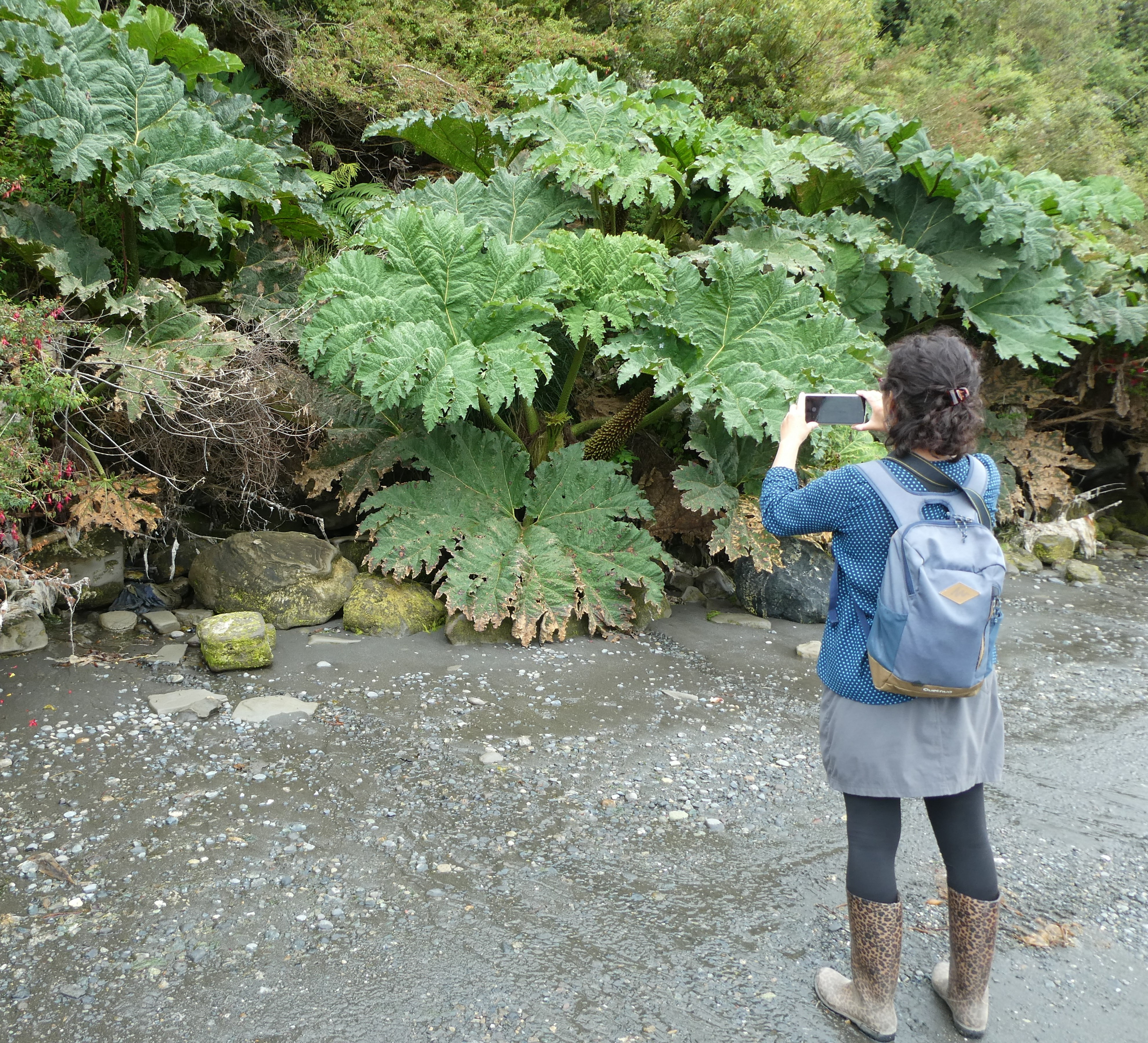
Human for scale in Chiloé Island, Chile

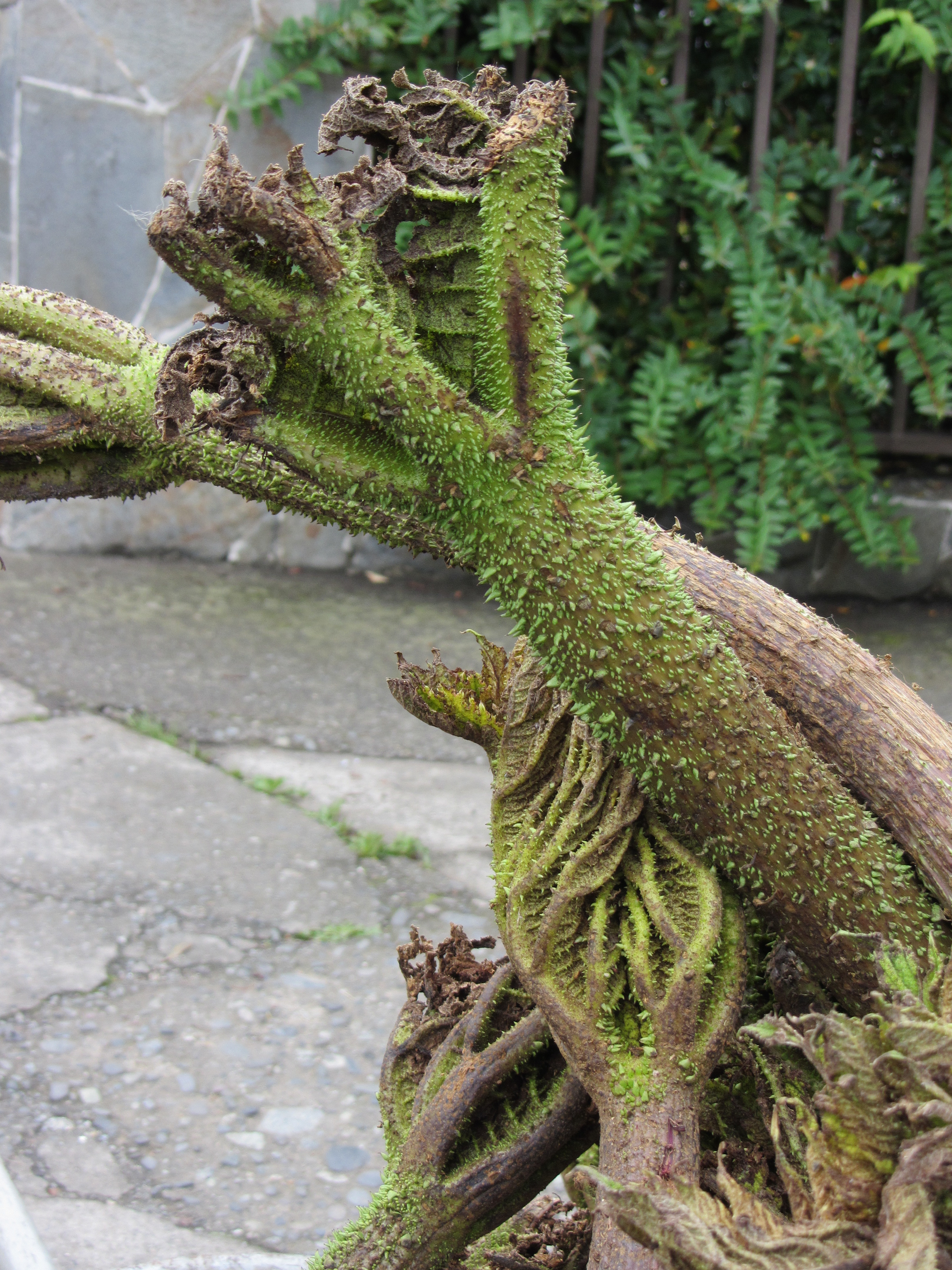
Chilean rhubarb on sale at a street in Puerto Varas.

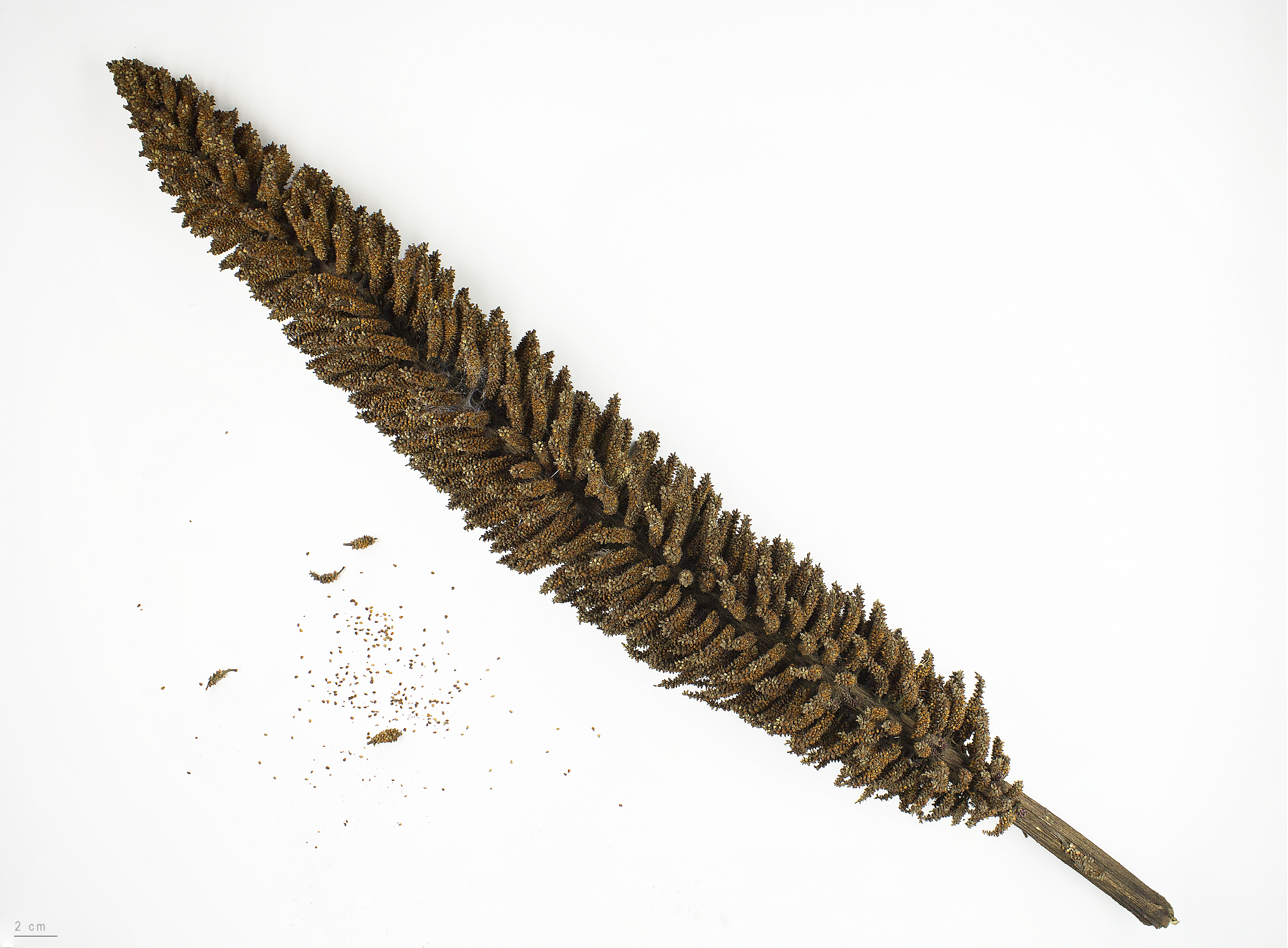
Dried panicle

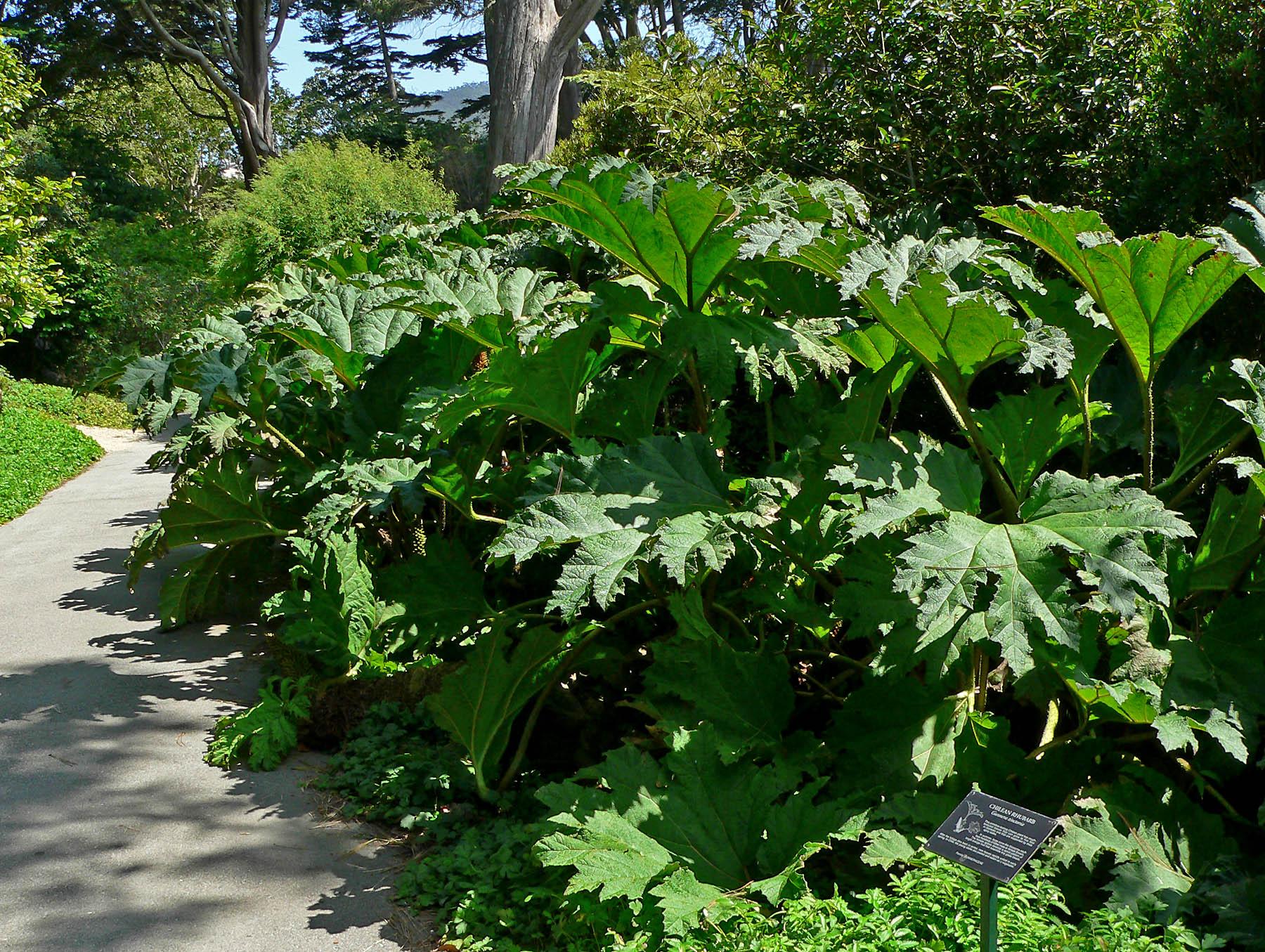
The plant at SF Botanical Garden

== Notes ==
- The blue-green alga Nostoc is a symbiont in Gunnera.
