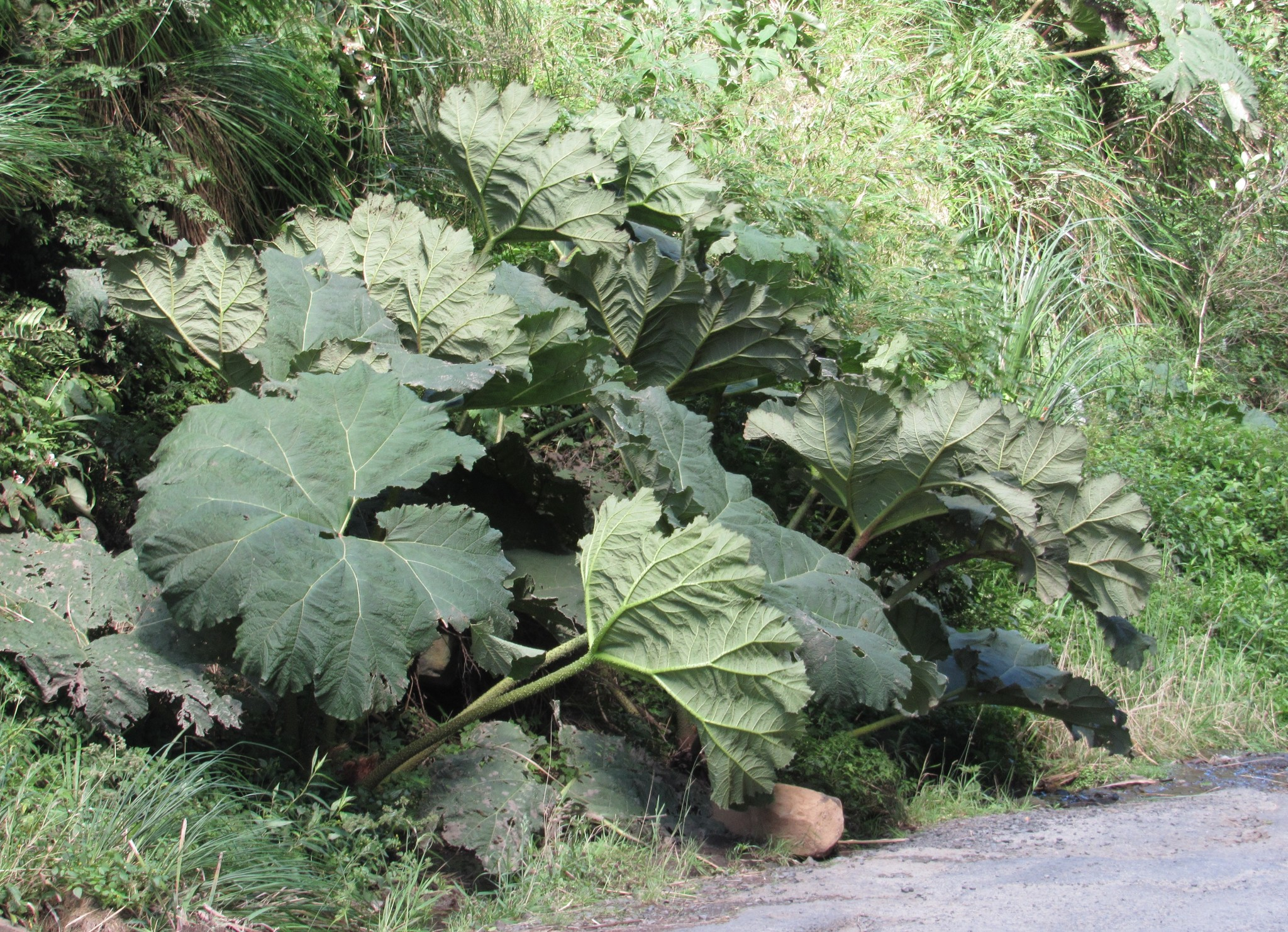
- Gunnera manicata in State of Santa Catarina, Brazil

Scientific classification
- Kingdom: Plantae
- Clade: Tracheophytes
- Clade: Angiosperms
- Clade: Eudicots
- Order: Gunnerales
- Family: Gunneraceae
- Genus: Gunnera
- Species: G. manicata

Binomial name
- Gunnera manicata Linden

= Gunnera manicata =

Species of flowering plant

Gunnera manicata, known as Brazilian giant-rhubarb, giant rhubarb, or dinosaur food is a species of flowering plant in the family Gunneraceae from the coastal Serra do Mar Mountains of Santa Catarina, Parana and Rio Grande do Sul States, Brazil. In cultivation, the name G. manicata has regularly been wrongly applied to the hybrid with G. tinctoria, G. × cryptica.

== Description ==
Gunnera manicata is a large, clump-forming herbaceous perennial growing to 2.5 m (8 ft) tall by 4 m (13 ft) or more in width. The leaves of G. manicata grow to an impressive size. Leaves with diameters well in excess of 1.2 metres (3 ft 11 in) are commonplace, with a spread of 3 by 3 metres (10 ft × 10 ft) on a mature plant. The largest on record had leaves up to 3.4 m (11 ft) in width. It is the largest of all the Gunnera species, but not the tallest (see Gunnera masafuerae). The underside of the leaf and the whole stalk have spikes on them. In early summer it bears tiny red-green, dimerous flowers in conical branched panicles, followed by small, spherical fruit. Like most gunneras, it has a symbiotic relationship with certain blue-green algae which provide nitrogen by fixation.

Despite the common name "giant rhubarb" it is not closely related to true rhubarb. It was named after the Norwegian bishop and naturalist Johan Ernst Gunnerus, who also named and published a description about the basking shark.

== Distribution ==
Gunnera manicata is native to the Serra do Mar mountains of coastal Santa Catarina and Rio Grande do Sul states, Brazil, where it is used in traditional medicine for sexually transmitted diseases.

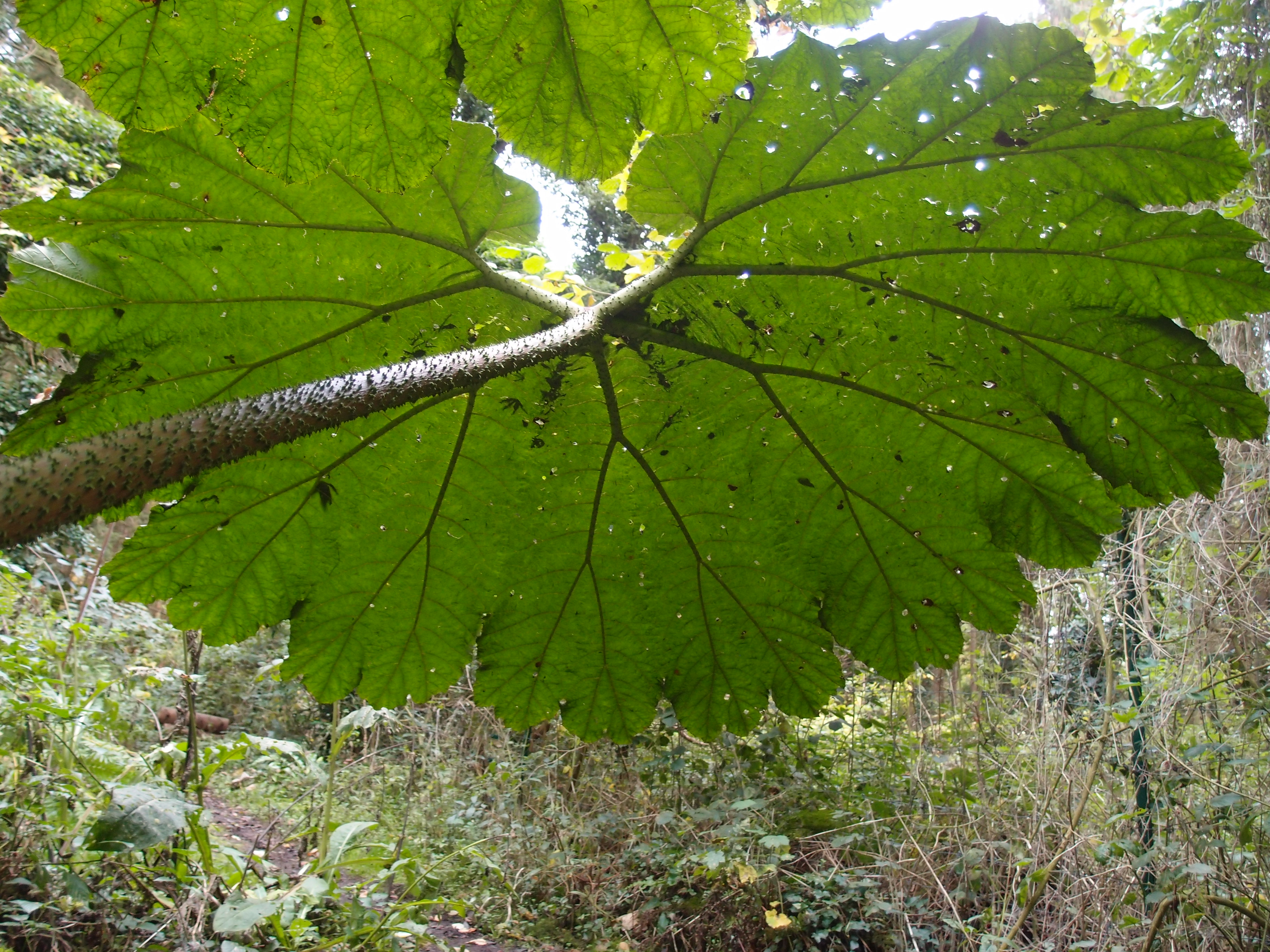
Gunnera manicata in the jungle garden in France

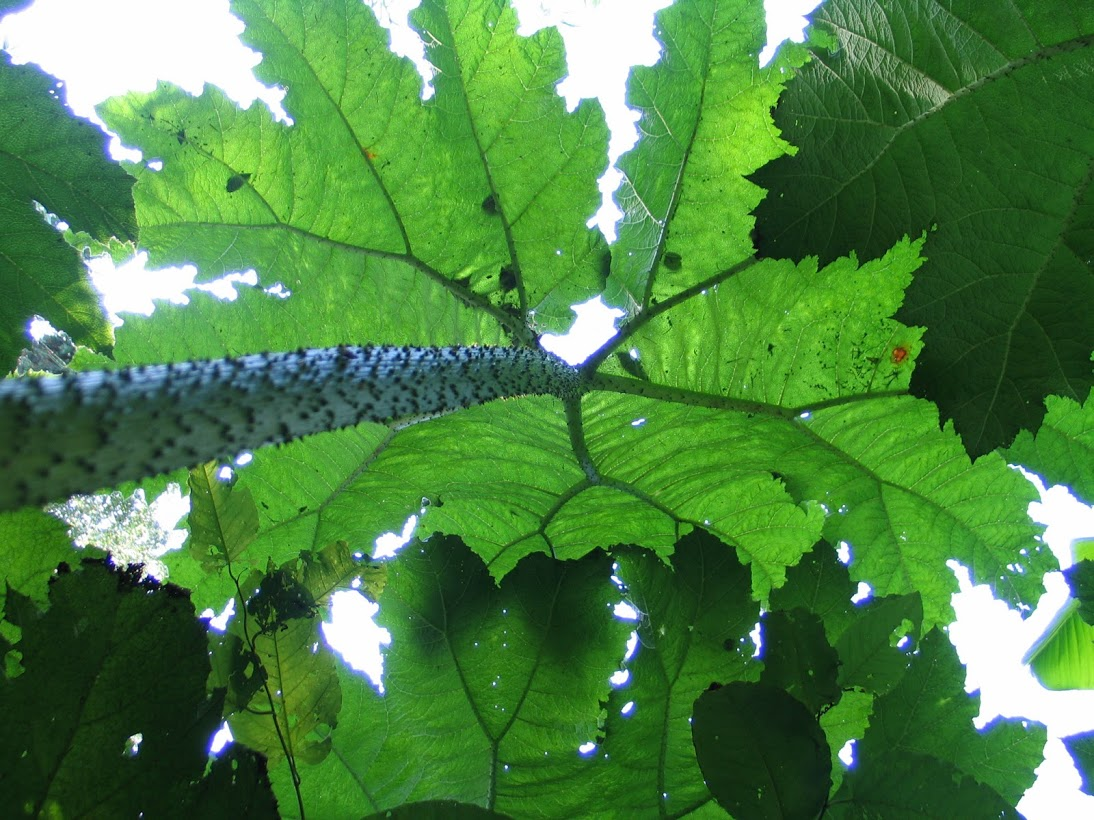
Gunnera × cryptica, jardin jungle

The plants in Western Europe, both feral and cultivated, have been largely or completely replaced by the hybrid Gunnera × cryptica.

== Cultivation ==
Giant rhubarb came to be widely cultivated in the United Kingdom and Ireland as an ornamental garden plant. It was primarily grown for its massive leaves. It grows best in damp conditions such as near garden ponds, but dislikes winter cold and wet.

However, in 2022, the Royal Horticultural Society found that these plants were actually Gunnera × cryptica, a hybrid of G. manicata with highly invasive Gunnera tinctoria.

In December 2023, the UK Department for Environment, Food and Rural Affairs banned Gunnera × cryptica: it cannot be sold or cultivated, and those who have it in their gardens must ensure it does not spread.
