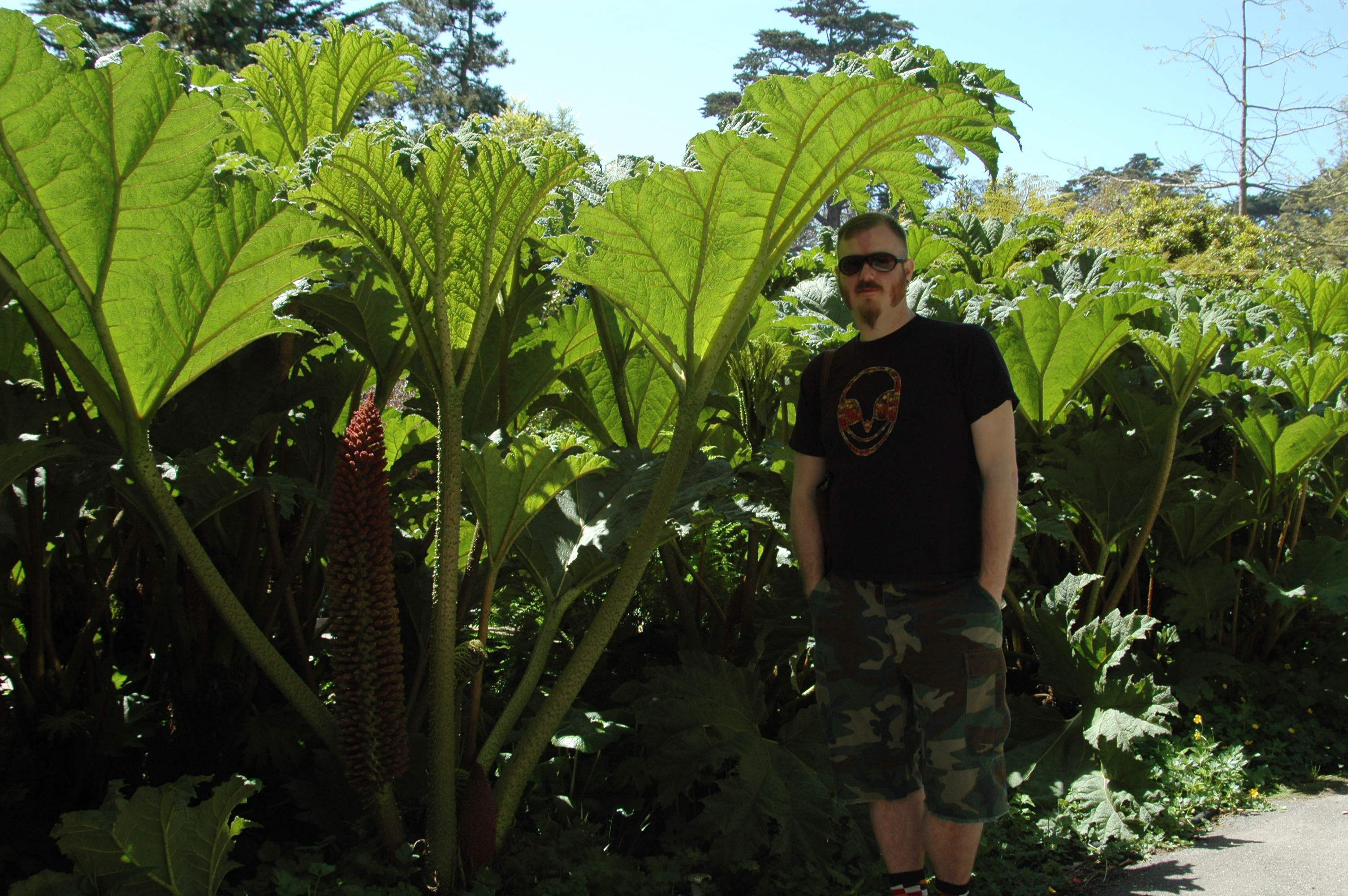
- Gunnera tinctoria at the San Francisco Botanical Garden at Strybing Arboretum

Scientific classification
- Kingdom: Plantae
- Clade: Embryophytes
- Clade: Tracheophytes
- Clade: Angiosperms
- Clade: Eudicots
- Order: Gunnerales
- Family: Gunneraceae; Meisn.
- Genus: Gunnera; L.

Type species
- Gunnera perpensa L.
- The range of the genus Gunnera

Synonyms
- Milligania Hook.f., rejected name; Panke Molina; Pankea Oerst.

= Gunnera =

Gunnera Temporal range: Late Cretaceous - present, 90–0 Ma

Genus of flowering plants

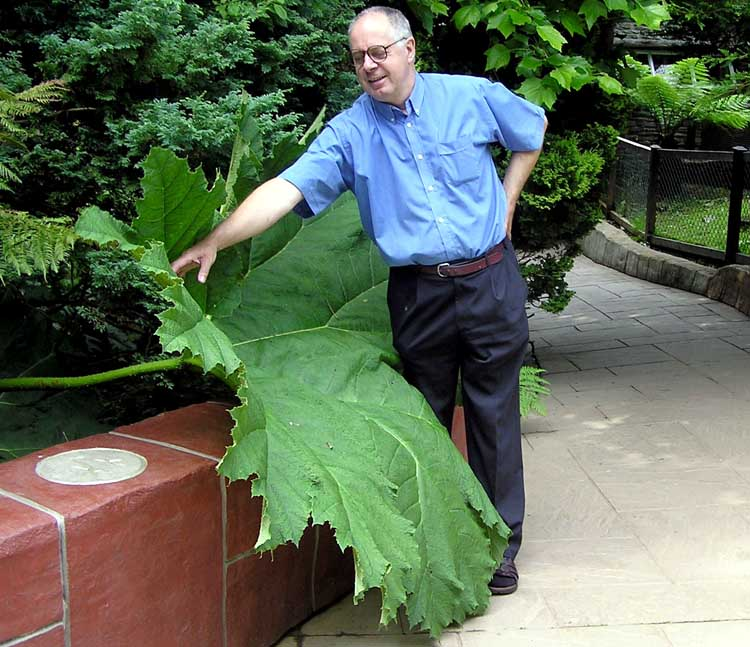
Gunnera manicata, Devon, England

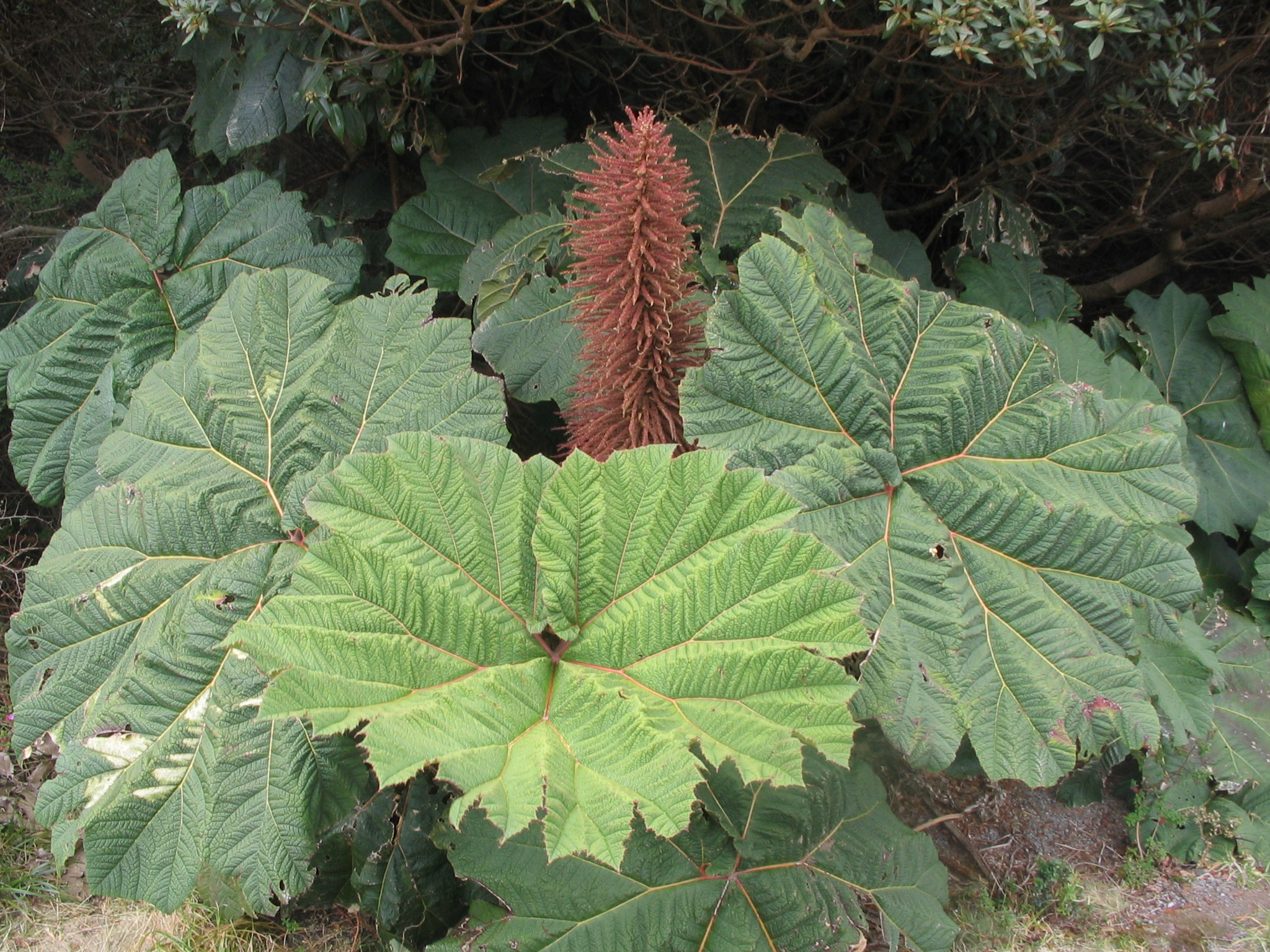
Gunnera insignis, Costa Rica

Gunnera is the sole genus of herbaceous flowering plants in the family Gunneraceae, which contains 63 species. Some species in this genus, namely those in the subgenus Panke, have extremely large leaves. Species in the genus are variously native to Latin America, Australia, New Zealand, Papuasia, Hawaii, insular Southeast Asia, eastern Africa, and Madagascar. The stalks of some species are edible.

== Taxonomy ==
Gunnera is the only genus in the family Gunneraceae. The APG II system of 2003 accepted this family and assigned it to the order Gunnerales in the clade core eudicots. The family then consisted of one or two genera, Gunnera and, optionally, Myrothamnus, the latter optionally segregated as a separate family, Myrothamnaceae. This represents a change from the APG system of 1998, which accepted two separate families, unplaced as to order. The APG III system and APG IV system accept the family Gunneraceae, and places Myrothamnus in Myrothamnaceae; both families are placed in the order Gunnerales in the core eudicots.

The genus Gunnera was named after the Norwegian botanist Johann Ernst Gunnerus. At first it was assigned to the family Haloragaceae, though that presented difficulties that led to the general recognition of the family Gunneraceae, as had been proposed about the beginning of the 20th century. In the meantime, in many publications it had been referred to as being in the Haloragaceae, variously misspelt (as for example "Halorrhagidaceae".) Such references still cause difficulties in consulting earlier works. However, currently Gunnera is firmly assigned to the monogeneric family Gunneraceae.

The type species of the genus is Gunnera perpensa L.

=== Evolution ===
Gunnera is thought to be a rather ancient group, with a well-documented fossil history due to the presence of fossilized pollen spores, known by the palynotaxon Tricolpites reticulatus. It is a Gondwanan lineage, having originated in South America during the Cretaceous. The earliest fossilized pollen is known from the Late Cretaceous (Turonian) of Peru, about 90 million years ago, and within the following 10 million years, Gunnera had achieved a worldwide distribution, with fossil pollen grains being found in areas where it is not found today, such as western North America, mainland Australia, and Antarctica. Based on fossil pollen recovered from drilling cores, Gunnera is also known to have inhabited the now-submerged islands of the Ninetyeast Ridge during the Paleocene, likely having dispersed there from either Australasia or the then-emergent Kerguelen Plateau islands.

Due to the widespread distribution of Gunnera during the Cretaceous, it was previously thought that the modern disjunct distribution of the genus was a relic of this period. However, phylogenetic analysis indicates that the majority of Gunnera species, even those found on entirely different continents, diverged from each other during the Cenozoic, indicating that the modern distribution of Gunnera is a consequence of long-distance dispersal from South America to other parts of the world, rather than relics of a former cosmopolitan distribution. The only species that diverged prior to the Cenozoic is Gunnera herteri, described from Uruguay and distributed in Uruguay and southeastern Brazil, which is thought to be the most ancient species of the genus, its lineage having diverged during the Late Cretaceous, roughly concurrent with the oldest Gunnera fossil pollen from Peru. The persistence of the Gunnera crown group since the Cretaceous makes it unique among flowering plants, and may have been facilitated by strong niche conservatism, dispersal ability, and being able to aggressively colonize disturbed land.

== Description ==
The 40–50 species vary enormously in leaf size, with the iconic large-leaved species belonging to the subgenus Panke. The giant rhubarb, or Campos des Loges (Gunnera manicata), native to the Serra do Mar mountains of southeastern Brazil, is perhaps the largest species, with reniform or sub-reniform leaves typically 1.5 to 2.0 m (5 to 7 ft) long, not including the thick, succulent petiole which may be up to 2.5 m (8 ft) in length. The width of the leaf blade is typically 2.5 m (8 ft), but on two occasions cultivated specimens (in Dorset, England in 2011 and at Narrowwater, Ulster, Ireland in 1903) produced leaves fully 3.3 m (11 ft) in width. The seeds germinate best in very moist, but not wet, conditions and temperatures of 22–29 °C.

Only slightly smaller is Gunnera masafuerae of the Juan Fernandez Islands off the Chilean coast. They can have leaves up to 2.9 m (10 ft) in width on stout leaf stalks 1.5 m (5 ft) long and 11 cm (4 1/2 in) thick according to Skottsberg. These leaf stalks or petioles are the thickest of any dicot, and probably also the most massive. On nearby Isla Más Afuera, Gunnera peltata frequently has an upright trunk to 5.5 m (18 ft) in height by 25–30 cm (10–12 in) thick, bearing leaves up to 2 m (7 ft) wide. The Hoja de Pantano (Gunnera magnifica) of the Colombian Andes bears the largest leaf buds of any plant; up to 60 cm (2 ft) long and 40 cm (16 in) thick. The succulent leaf stalks are up to 2.7 m (9 ft) long. The massive inflorescence of small, reddish flowers is up to 2.3 m (8 ft) long and weighs about 13 kg. The flowers of Gunnera species are dimerous (two sepals, two petals (or none), two stamens (or one), and two carpels. Other giant Gunnera species within the subgenus Panke are found throughout the Neotropics and Hawaii. Gunnera insignis is also known by the name "poor man's umbrella" in Costa Rica.

Outside of the subgenus Panke, some Gunnera species have small-to-medium-sized leaves. There are some species with moderately large leaves in Africa (G. perpensa, in the subgenus Gunnera, syn. subgenus Perpensum); and Southeast Asia (G. macrophylla, in the subgenus Pseudogunnera), but the others are low-lying, mat-forming plants with small leaves. There are several small species are found in New Zealand, notably G. albocarpa, with leaves only 1–2 cm long, and also in South America, with G. magellanica having leaves 5–9 cm wide on stalks 8–15 cm long. G. herteri, which is sister to all other members of the genus and is found in Uruguay and Brazil, also has small leaves.

Some fossil leaf impressions of Gunnera from the Cretaceous of North America have large leaves akin to those of Panke, and G. mexicana, which is sister to all other extant species within Panke, is the northernmost member. For this reason, it has been suggested that Panke originates from South American Gunnera that colonized North America during the Cretaceous and grew into giant forms, with the remaining South American Gunnera evolving into the subgenus Misandra, with a low-lying, matlike growth. During the Cenozoic, the North American Panke would have colonized Hawaii and retreated southwards on the mainland before recolonizing South America. However, more recent phylogenetic evidence suggests that Misandra and Panke diverged only 15 million years ago, much too recent to assign the Cretaceous Gunnera to Panke. Due to this, the large-leaved Cretaceous Gunnera from North America may represent a distinct lineage that convergently evolved giant leaves similar to those of Panke, but did not leave any descendants.

== Species ==
As of April 2023, Plants of the World Online accepts the following species separated by subgenus:

Subgenus	Image	Scientific name	Distribution
Ostenigunnera Mattfeld, 1933		Gunnera herteri Osten	Uruguay, S Brazil
Pseudogunnera Schindler, 1905		Gunnera macrophylla Blume	Papuasia, Indonesia, Philippines
Milligania Schindler, 1905		Gunnera albocarpa (Kirk) Cockayne	New Zealand
Milligania Schindler, 1905		Gunnera arenaria Cheeseman ex Kirk	New Zealand
Milligania Schindler, 1905		Gunnera cordifolia (Hook.f.) Hook.f.	Tasmania
Milligania Schindler, 1905		Gunnera densiflora Hook.f.	New Zealand
Milligania Schindler, 1905		Gunnera dentata Kirk	New Zealand
Milligania Schindler, 1905		Gunnera flavida Colenso	New Zealand
Milligania Schindler, 1905		Gunnera hamiltonii Kirk ex W.S.Ham.	New Zealand
Milligania Schindler, 1905		Gunnera mixta Kirk	New Zealand
Milligania Schindler, 1905		Gunnera monoica Raoul	New Zealand incl Chatham Islands
Milligania Schindler, 1905		Gunnera prorepens Hook.f.	New Zealand
Milligania Schindler, 1905		Gunnera reniformis Ridl.	New Guinea
Milligania Schindler, 1905		Gunnera strigosa (Kirk) Colenso	New Zealand
Panke Schindler, 1905		Gunnera aequatoriensis L.E.Mora	Ecuador
Panke Schindler, 1905		Gunnera annae Schindl.	Peru, Bolivia
Panke Schindler, 1905		Gunnera antioquensis L.E.Mora	Colombia
Panke Schindler, 1905		Gunnera apiculata Schindl.	Bolivia, Argentina
Panke Schindler, 1905		Gunnera atropurpurea L.E.Mora	Colombia, Ecuador
Panke Schindler, 1905		Gunnera berteroi Phil.	Bolivia, Argentina, Chile
Panke Schindler, 1905		Gunnera bogotana L.E.Mora	Colombia
Panke Schindler, 1905		Gunnera bolivari J.F.Macbr.	Peru, Ecuador
Panke Schindler, 1905		Gunnera boliviana Morong	Bolivia
Panke Schindler, 1905		Gunnera bracteata Steud. ex Benn.	Robinson Crusoe Island in Chile
Panke Schindler, 1905		Gunnera brephogea Linden & André	Colombia, Ecuador, Peru
Panke Schindler, 1905		Gunnera caucana L.E.Mora	Colombia
Panke Schindler, 1905		Gunnera colombiana L.E.Mora	Colombia, Ecuador
Panke Schindler, 1905		Gunnera × cryptica J.M.H.Shaw (G. manicata × G. tinctoria)	Cultivated
Panke Schindler, 1905		Gunnera cuatrecasasii L.E.Mora	Colombia
Panke Schindler, 1905		Gunnera diazii L.E.Mora	Colombia
Panke Schindler, 1905		Gunnera garciae-barrigae L.E.Mora	Colombia
Panke Schindler, 1905		Gunnera hernandezii L.E.Mora	Colombia
Panke Schindler, 1905		Gunnera insignis (Oerst.) Oerst.	Panama, Nicaragua, Costa Rica
Panke Schindler, 1905		Gunnera × katherine-wilsoniae L.D.Gómez (G. insignis × G. talamancana)	Costa Rica
Panke Schindler, 1905		Gunnera kauaiensis Rock	Kauai in Hawaii
Panke Schindler, 1905		Gunnera killipiana Lundell	Chiapas, Guatemala, Honduras
Panke Schindler, 1905		Gunnera lozanoi L.E.Mora	Colombia
Panke Schindler, 1905		Gunnera magnifica H.St.John	Colombia
Panke Schindler, 1905		Gunnera manicata Linden ex André	S Brazil
Panke Schindler, 1905		Gunnera margaretae Schindl.	Peru, Bolivia
Panke Schindler, 1905		Gunnera masafuerae Skottsb.	Alejandro Selkirk Island (Isla Mas Afuera) in Chile
Panke Schindler, 1905		Gunnera mexicana Brandegee	Veracruz, Chiapas
Panke Schindler, 1905		Gunnera morae Wanntorp & Klack.	Colombia
Panke Schindler, 1905		Gunnera peltata Phil.	Robinson Crusoe Island in Chile
Panke Schindler, 1905		Gunnera peruviana J.F.Macbr.	Ecuador, Peru
Panke Schindler, 1905		Gunnera petaloidea Gaudich.	Hawaii
Panke Schindler, 1905		Gunnera pilosa Kunth	Peru, Bolivia, Ecuador
Panke Schindler, 1905		Gunnera pittieriana V.M.Badillo & Steyerm.	Venezuela
Panke Schindler, 1905		Gunnera quitoensis L.E.Mora	Ecuador
Panke Schindler, 1905		Gunnera saint-johnii (L.E.Mora) L.E.Mora	Colombia
Panke Schindler, 1905		Gunnera sanctae-marthae L.E.Mora	Colombia
Panke Schindler, 1905		Gunnera schindleri L.E.Mora	Bolivia, Argentina
Panke Schindler, 1905		Gunnera schultesii L.E.Mora	Colombia
Panke Schindler, 1905		Gunnera silvioana L.E.Mora	Ecuador, Colombia
Panke Schindler, 1905		Gunnera steyermarkii L.E.Mora	Venezuela
Panke Schindler, 1905		Gunnera tacueyana L.E.Mora	Colombia
Panke Schindler, 1905		Gunnera tajumbina L.E.Mora	Ecuador, Colombia
Panke Schindler, 1905		Gunnera talamancana H.Weber & L.E.Mora	Costa Rica, Panama
Panke Schindler, 1905		Gunnera tamanensis L.E.Mora	Colombia
Panke Schindler, 1905		Gunnera tayrona L.E.Mora	Colombia
Panke Schindler, 1905		Gunnera tinctoria (Molina) Mirb.	Chile, Argentina
Panke Schindler, 1905		Gunnera venezolana L.E.Mora	Venezuela
Misandra Schindler, 1905		Gunnera magellanica Lam.	W + S South America, Falkland Is.
Misandra Schindler, 1905		Gunnera lobata Hook.f.	Tierra del Fuego
Gunnera		Gunnera perpensa L.	Africa, Madagascar

In 2022, it was shown that plants in cultivation under the name Gunnera manicata were actually a hybrid, Gunnera × cryptica.

== Cyanobacterial symbiosis ==
At least some species of Gunnera host endosymbiotic cyanobacteria such as Nostoc punctiforme. The cyanobacteria provide fixed nitrogen to the plant, while the plant provides fixed carbon to the microbe. The bacteria enter the plant via glands found at the base of each leaf stalk and initiate an intracellular symbiosis which is thought to provide the plant with fixed nitrogen in return for fixed carbon for the bacterium. The Nostoc-filled symbiotic tissue makes up just a small portion of the plant's total biomass. Gunnera is the only known genus of angiosperms that hosts cyanobacteria, and the only known land plant with intracellular cyanobionts. Although the endosymbionts enters the cell wall, they do not penetrate the cell membrane. This relationship may provide insights to allow the creation of novel symbioses between crop plants and cyanobacteria, allowing growth in areas lacking fixed nitrogen in the soil.

== Uses ==
The stalks of G. tinctoria (nalca), from southern Chile and Argentina, are edible. Their principal use is fresh consumption, after peeling, but also they are prepared in salads, liquor or marmalade. Leaves of this species are used in covering curanto (a traditional Chilean food).

Gunnera perpensa is a source of traditional medicine in southern Africa, both in veterinary and human ailments, largely in obstetric and digestive complaints, but also as a wound dressing. It also is eaten in various ways, largely the petioles, flower stalks and leaves, fresh and raw, preferably with skins and fibre removed, which is said to remove bitterness, but also cooked. The plant also is said to be used in making a beer.
