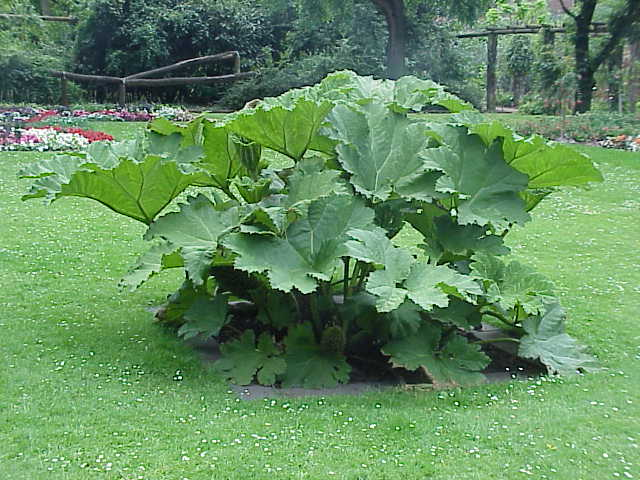
- Gunnera

Scientific classification
- Kingdom: Plantae
- Clade: Tracheophytes
- Clade: Angiosperms
- Clade: Eudicots
- Clade: Core eudicots
- Order: Gunnerales; Takht. ex Reveal

Families
- Gunneraceae; Myrothamnaceae

= Gunnerales =

Gunnerales Temporal range: Aptian - present, 125–0 Ma

Order of flowering plants

The Gunnerales are an order of flowering plants. In the APG III (2009) and APG IV systems (2016), the order contains two genera: Gunnera (family Gunneraceae) and Myrothamnus (Myrothamnaceae). In the Cronquist system (1981), the Gunneraceae were in the Haloragales and Myrothamnaceae in the Hamamelidales. DNA analysis proved definitive, but the grouping of the two families was a surprise, given their very dissimilar morphologies. In the older systems of Cronquist (1981, 1988) and Takhtajan (1997), the Gunneraceae were in the Rosidae, and the Myrothamnaceae were in the Hamamelids. In modern classification systems, such as APG III and APG IV, this order was the first to diverge from the core eudicots. Some of the oldest fossils come from fossils dating the Aptian stage in places like Antarctica, Egypt and Argentina with these early pollen samples being known as Tricolpites. At that time those landmasses were part of the continent known as Gondwana.

== Description ==
Both families contain ellagic acid. Phloem cells contain a large number of plastids and the leaves have dented borders.

The plants are dioecious and possess small flowers without perianth, and the stigma is, at least weakly, secretory. Gunnerales characters shared with the core eudicots are cyanogenesis via phenylalanine, metabolic pathways of isoleucine or valine, presence of the DNA sequence of PI-dB motif, and is common to have a small deletion in the sequence of 18S ribosomal DNA. The characters which it shares with the core eudicots, and also with Buxales and Trochodendrales, are an absence of benzylisoquinoline alkaloids, euAP3 + TM6 genes (gene duplication paleoAP3: Class B), and a loss of the mitochondrial gene rps2.

== Ecology ==
Despite being related, the Myrothamnaceae and the Gunneraceae look very different:

- The Gunneraceae are a mesophilic herb (often oversized), and the hydathodes are well developed and secrete mucilage or perhaps a resinous coating.
- The Myrothamnaceae are a reviviscent shrub of arid habitats, and the hydathodes are poorly developed and secrete plant resin.

Both have flowers without perianth, but the details of pollen (e.g. Zavada and Dilcher see 1986 10, Wanntorp et al. 2004th 2004b 11 and 12) differ. In Wilkinson 2000 13 is a table of differences.
